= APA Award for Distinguished Scientific Contributions to Psychology =

The APA Award for Distinguished Scientific Contributions to Psychology is an award of the American Psychological Association that "honors psychologists who have made distinguished theoretical or empirical contributions to basic research in psychology."

== Recipients ==
Source: APA

=== 20th century ===
- 1956 Wolfgang Köhler, Carl R. Rogers, Kenneth W. Spence
- 1957 Carl I. Hovland, Curt P. Richter, Edward C. Tolman
- 1958 Frank A. Beach, Paul E. Meehl, B. F. Skinner
- 1959 Leon Festinger, Donald B. Lindsley, Neal E. Miller
- 1960 Harry F. Harlow, Charles E. Osgood, S. Smith Stevens
- 1961 James J. Gibson, Donald O. Hebb, Henry A. Murray
- 1962 Jerome S. Bruner, William K. Estes, Harry Helson
- 1963 Roger G. Barker, George A. Miller, Carl Pfaffmann
- 1964 Gordon W. Allport, Wendell R. Garner, J. P. Guilford
- 1965 Floyd Allport, Fritz Heider, Paul Thomas Young
- 1966 Nancy Bayley, Clarence H. Graham, Richard L. Solomon
- 1967 Solomon E. Asch, Ernest R. Hilgard, James Olds
- 1968 James E. Birren, Eleanor J. Gibson, Muzafer Sherif
- 1969 Jean Piaget, Stanley Schachter, Herbert A. Simon
- 1970 Donald T. Campbell, David Krech, R. Duncan Luce
- 1971 Roger William Brown, Harold H. Kelley, Roger Wolcott Sperry
- 1972 Edwin E. Ghiselli, Dorothea Jameson, Leo Hurvich, Patrick Suppes
- 1973 Lee J. Cronbach, Brenda Milner, Benton J. Underwood
- 1974 Angus Campbell, Lorrin A. Riggs, Richard F. Thompson
- 1975 Donald E. Broadbent, Robert R. Sears, David Shakow
- 1976 Beatrice C. Lacey, John I. Lacey, Theodore Newcomb, Roger N. Shepard
- 1977 Richard C. Atkinson, Russell L. De Valois, Edward E. Jones
- 1978 Julian Hochberg, Philip Teitelbaum, Robert B. Zajonc
- 1979 John W. Atkinson, Gordon H. Bower, John Garcia
- 1980 Albert Bandura, Alvin M. Liberman, Michael I. Posner
- 1981 David M. Green, Irving L. Janis, James L. McGaugh
- 1982 Daniel Kahneman, Amos Tversky, Walter Mischel, Mark R. Rosenzweig
- 1983 John W. Thibaut, Endel Tulving, Hans Wallach
- 1984 Noam Chomsky, John H. Flavell, Floyd Ratliff
- 1985 Clyde Coombs, Mortimer Mishkin, Allen Newell
- 1986 Robert P. Abelson, Gunnar Johansson, Robert A. Rescorla
- 1987 Morton Deutsch, Jerome Kagan, David C. McClelland, Saul Sternberg, Niko Tinbergen, Ledyard R. Tucker
- 1988 Irving T. Diamond, Frederic M. Lord, Eleanor E. Maccoby, William J. McGuire, Julian B. Rotter, George Sperling
- 1989 Mary D. Salter Ainsworth, John Bowlby, J. Douglas Carroll, Richard S. Lazarus
- 1990 Frances K. Graham, John A. Swets, Anne Treisman
- 1991 Paul Ekman, Patricia S. Goldman-Rakic, Richard E. Nisbett
- 1992 Ursula Bellugi, Edward S. Klima, Walter Kintsch, K. Warner Schaie
- 1993 Peter J. Lang, Paul Slovic, Larry R. Squire
- 1994 John R. Anderson, Jon Kaas, Neil Schneiderman
- 1995 Rochel Gelman, William A. Mason, Michael L. Rutter
- 1996 Robert W. Goy, James L. McClelland, David E. Rumelhart, Shelley E. Taylor
- 1997 Ellen S. Berscheid, Edward Smith, Robert H. Wurtz
- 1998/1999 Elliot Aronson, William T. Greenough, Allan R. Wagner
- 2000 Richard J. Davidson, E. Tory Higgins, Elizabeth S. Spelke

=== 21st century ===
- 2001 Alan D. Baddeley, Irving I. Gottesman, Michael M. Merzenich
- 2002 John T. Cacioppo, David E. Meyer, William T. Newsome
- 2003 Lila R. Gleitman, Bruce S. McEwen, Claude M. Steele
- 2004 Sheldon Cohen, E. Mavis Hetherington, Richard M. Shiffrin
- 2005 Charles G. Gross, Douglas L. Medin, Robert S. Siegler
- 2006 Michael Davis, Marcia K. Johnson, Martin E. P. Seligman
- 2007 Marilynn B. Brewer, Jean M. Mandler, Paul Rozin
- 2008 Michael S. Gazzaniga, Janellen Huttenlocher, Hazel Rose Markus
- 2009 Susan E. Carey, Alice H. Eagly, Steven F. Maier
- 2010 Jonathan D. Cohen, Susan T. Fiske, Joseph E. LeDoux
- 2011 Barry J. Everitt, Trevor W. Robbins, Carol S. Dweck, Daniel M. Wegner
- 2012 Edward F. Diener, Michael Meaney, Daniel L. Schacter
- 2013 Ian H. Gotlib, Robert M. Sapolsky, Linda B. Smith
- 2014 Richard N. Aslin, John A. Bargh, Carol A. Barnes
- 2015 Stanislas Dehaene, Edna B. Foa, Michael Tomasello
- 2016 Dedre Gentner, Terrie E. Moffitt and Avshalom Caspi, Terry E. Robinson and Kent C. Berridge
- 2017 Mahzarin R. Banaji and Anthony G. Greenwald, Gordon D. Logan, Robert J. Plomin
- 2018 Charles S. Carver, Michael F. Scheier, Janice K. Kiecolt-Glaser, Patricia K. Kuhl
- 2019 Linda M. Bartoshuk, Dante Cicchetti, David A. Kenny
- 2020 Stephen P. Hinshaw, Elissa L. Newport, Lynn Nadel and John O’Keefe
- 2021 Lisa Feldman Barrett, Megan R. Gunnar, Henry L. Roediger
- 2022 BJ Casey, Susan A. Gelman, Shinobu Kitayama
- 2023 Michael Fanselow, Vonnie McLoyd, Jennifer Richeson
- 2024 Jacquelynne Eccles, Lynn Hasher, Shinobu Kitayama, Henry Wellman, Rose Zacks
- 2025 Susan J. Goldin-Meadow, Alison Gopnik, Arie Kruglanski

== See also ==
- List of psychology awards
