= Annual Review of Developmental Psychology =

- Discipline: Developmental psychology
- Language: English
- Edited by: Avshalom Caspi; Sandra R. Waxman

Publication details
- History: 2019; 7 years ago
- Publisher: Annual Reviews (US)
- Frequency: Annually
- Open access: Subscribe to Open
- Impact factor: 5.0 (2025)

Standard abbreviations
- ISO 4: Annu. Rev. Dev. Psychol.

Indexing
- ISSN: 2640-7922

Links
- Journal homepage

The Annual Review of Developmental Psychology is an academic journal published by Annual Reviews (AR) that covers significant advances in the developmental sciences across the lifespan through the publication of an annual volume of review articles. Founded in 2019 by Susan A. Gelman and Sandra R. Waxman, its current editors are Sandra R. Waxman and Avshalom Caspi. As of 2023, the Annual Review of Developmental Psychology is being published as open access, under the Subscribe to Open model. As of 2026 Journal Citation Reports gives the journal an impact factor of 5.0.

== History ==
The Annual Review of Developmental Psychology was first published in 2019 by Annual Reviews (AR), a nonprofit organization whose stated mission is to synthesize knowledge "for the progress of science and the benefit of society." The journal's founding editors were Susan A. Gelman and Sandra R. Waxman. As of 2024, the editors became Sandra R. Waxman and Avshalom Caspi.

== Scope and indexing ==
The Annual Review of Developmental Psychology defines its scope as covering significant advances relevant to "the developmental sciences, including cognitive, linguistic, social, cultural, and biological processes across the lifespan".

As of 2026, Journal Citation Reports lists the journal's impact factor as 5.0, ranking it ninth of 95 journal titles in the category "Psychology, Developmental (ESCI)". It is abstracted and indexed in Science Citation Index Expanded (SCIE), Social Sciences Citation Index (SSCI), Arts & Humanities Citation Index (AHCI) among others.

== Editorial processes ==
The Annual Review of Developmental Psychology is helmed by the editor or the co-editors. The editor is assisted by the editorial committee, which includes associate editors, regular members, and occasionally guest editors. Guest members participate at the invitation of the editor, and serve terms of one year. All other members of the editorial committee are appointed by the AR board of directors and serve five-year terms. The editorial committee determines which topics should be included in each volume and solicits reviews from qualified authors. Unsolicited manuscripts are not accepted. Peer review of accepted manuscripts is undertaken by the editorial committee.

As of 2025, the editorial committee consists of the two co-editors and the following members:

- Deanna Barch
- Nathan A. Fox
- Judit Gervain
- Diane Hughes
- Beatriz Luna
- Marjorie Rhodes (New York University)
- Elliot Tucker-Drob
- Janet F. Werker.
