= Daniel W. Belsky =

American epidemiologist

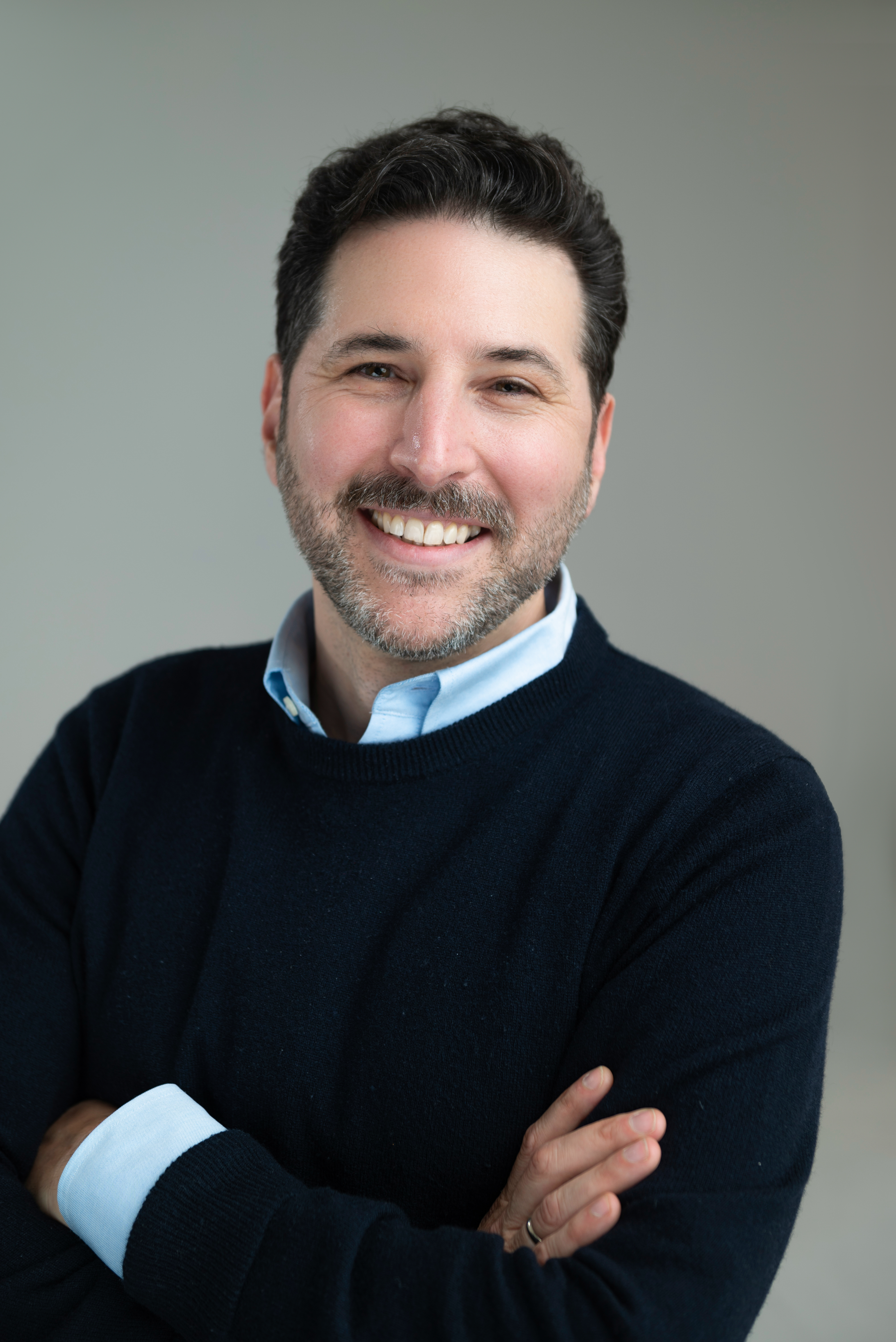
- Education: Swarthmore College (BA); University of North Carolina at Chapel Hill (PhD)
- Known for: Research on aging, geroscience, health disparities, and social genomics
- Scientific career
- Fields: Epidemiology, Aging research, Geroscience, Genomics
- Workplaces: Columbia University Mailman School of Public Health; Duke University School of Medicine
- Website: belskylab.com

Daniel W. Belsky is an American epidemiologist and researcher in aging, genomics, and population health. He is an Associate Professor of Epidemiology in the Robert N. Butler Columbia Aging Center at the Columbia University Mailman School of Public Health.

== Education ==
Belsky earned his B.A. in psychology from Swarthmore College in 2002. He completed his Ph.D. in Health Policy and Management at the University of North Carolina at Chapel Hill in 2012. He conducted postdoctoral research in developmental genetic epidemiology and aging research at Duke University Medical Center's Aging Center, working with Terrie E. Moffitt and Avshalom Caspi.

== Career ==
Belsky joined Columbia University in 2018 as an Assistant Professor of Epidemiology and became Associate Professor with tenure in 2023. He is also affiliated with the Robert N. Butler Columbia Aging Center. Before moving to Columbia, he was on the faculty at the Duke University School of Medicine, holding appointments in Medicine and Population Health Sciences, and earlier served as a Research Assistant Professor at Duke's Social Science Research Institute.

== Research ==
Belsky's research integrates epidemiology, genomics, and geroscience to examine health disparities and the biological processes of aging. His work seeks to translate insights from aging biology and geroscience into public health strategies to increase healthy lifespan. He has published on the interaction of genes and environment in shaping health across the life course.

According to Google Scholar, Belsky has an h-index of 73 and more than 28,000 citations.

== Honors and awards ==
- Vincent Cristofalo Rising Star Award in Aging Research, American Federation for Aging Research (2025)
- Neal Miller New Investigator Award, Academy of Behavioral Medicine (2023)
- Highly Cited Researchers (2020–2024)
- Canadian Institute for Advanced Research (CIFAR) CBD Network Fellow (2019)
