= Robert L. Hardgrave =

Robert L. Hardgrave Jr, (February 6, 1939 – May 21, 2023) was an American political scientist and historian who specialized in the politics of south India. Hardgrave was the Temple Professor Emeritus of the Humanities in Government and Asian Studies at the University of Texas at Austin.

== Biography ==
Hardgrave completed his undergraduate studies, majoring in government, at the University of Texas at Austin in 1960. He then travelled for a year, including a visit to what was then Madras State in south India. During this time he made contact with several leading politicians and leaders of the Dravidian movement. This research was written up and published as a book in 1965.

Hardgrave completed his graduate studies at the University of Chicago, with his PhD in Political Science awarded in 1966. He worked for a year at Oberlin College in Ohio, as an assistant professor. He moved to the University of Texas at Austin, where he taught until his retirement in 2001. His graduate research investigated the social and political status of the Nadar caste community in south India since the nineteenth century. The dissertation was written up and published in 1969 as The Nadars of Tamilnad. Writing in The Journal of Asian Studies Eugene Irschick judged the book to be 'an extraordinarily important contribution toward the delineation of the way in which important caste groups have risen to power in twentieth-century India'. Joan Mencher commented on the study of the Nadars in her review for American Anthropologist: 'Hardgrave presents an excellent account of their original position, the impact of the British period on them, the ways in which the caste improved its status'.

In Tamil Nadu Hardgrave is perhaps best known for what the film historian Theodore Bhaskaran described as 'ground-breaking' articles on Tamil cinema and politics that were published in the 1970s. He opened up an area of study that was overlooked by many mainstream scholars. At the University of Texas Hardgrave taught US politics as well as South Asian government. His co-authored textbook (with Stanley A. Kochanek) was widely used and ran to seven editions. His final research project covered the oeuvre of the Flemish artist, Balthazar Solvyns, who was active in eighteenth century Calcutta.

== Selected publications ==
- The Dravidian Movement. Bombay: Popular Prakashan, 1965.
- The Nadars of Tamil Nadu: The Political Culture of a Community in Change. Berkeley, CA: University of California Press, 1969.
- 'Politics and the Film in Tamilnadu: The Stars and the DMK'. Asian Survey, 13(3), 288–305. 1973.
- 'Films and political consciousness in Tamil Nadu'. Economic and Political Weekly, 10(1–2), 27–35. 1975. (with A.C. Neidhart)
- Essays in the political sociology of South India. Usha, 1979.
- India Under Pressure: Prospects for Political Stability. Westview Press, 1984.
- India: Government and Politics in a Developing Nation (co-authored with Stanley A. Kochanek). Boston, MA: Thomson/Wadsworth, 2008. Seventh edition. ISBN 978-0-495-00749-4
- Boats of Bengal: Eighteenth century portraits by Balthazar Solvyns. (etchings by Balthazar Solvyns, commentary by Robert L. Hardgrave) New Delhi: Manohar, 2001. ISBN 978-81-7304-358-1
- A portrait of the Hindus: Balthazar Solvyns and the European image of India 1760-1824. New York: Oxford University Press in association with Mapin. ISBN 978-0-19-522041-4
