= Patricia Buckfield =

New Zealand paediatrician and psychologist (1934–1995)

- Born: Patricia Marie Buckfield; 20 August 1934; Surrey, England
- Died: 13 June 1995 (aged 60); Wellington, New Zealand
- Education: University of Otago
- Known for: Contributions to the early development of the Dunedin Multidisciplinary Health and Development Study
- Scientific career
- Fields: Paediatrics; neonatology; child development
- Workplaces: University of Otago
- Thesis: The physical status of New Zealand infants at birth and delineation of factors affecting this status (1978)
- Notable students: Phil Silva

Patricia Marie Buckfield (20 August 1934 – 13 June 1995) was a New Zealand paediatrician and neonatologist. A pioneer of neonatal intensive care in New Zealand, she contributed to the early development of what became the Dunedin Multidisciplinary Health and Development Study (known as the Dunedin Study).

== Early life and education ==
Buckfield was born in Surrey, England, on 20 August 1934. Her family moved to New Zealand in the early 1950s, settling in Southland, and Buckfield was educated as a boarder at St Margaret's College, Christchurch, where she was head prefect of Acland House in 1952. She went on to study medicine at the University of Otago, graduating MB ChB in 1958.

== Medical training and career ==
After graduating from Otago, Buckfield held junior hospital appointments in Auckland and Dunedin, and gained a Diploma of Children's Health in 1963. From 1965 to 1967, she undertook postgraduate training in England, working at Hammersmith Hospital in London, where she held a registrar position in paediatrics under Peter Tizard.

Returning to Dunedin in 1967, Buckfield was appointed lecturer, then senior lecturer, in paediatrics at the University of Otago. Concurrently, she was a specialist paediatrician for the Otago Hospital Board, and became a pioneer of neonatal intensive care in New Zealand. Buckfield collected perinatal data on approximately 12,000 births at Dunedin's Queen Mary Hospital between 1967 and 1973. In 1973, she and educational psychologist Phil Silva conducted a pilot study, funded by the Medical Research Council, assessing 250 children at four or five. This project formed the basis for the Dunedin Multidisciplinary Health and Development Study.

In 1978, Buckfield was elected a Fellow of the Royal Australasian College of Physicians. The following year, she graduated with a Doctor of Medicine degree from the University of Otago; her doctoral thesis was titled The physical status of New Zealand infants at birth and delineation of factors affecting this status.

In 1982, Buckfield moved to Wellington as director of the Puketiro Centre and continued her work in developmental paediatrics until her death from cancer on 13 June 1995, at the age of 60. She had been elected a Fellow of the Royal College of Physicians of Edinburgh in 1983 and a Fellow of the Royal College of Physicians in 1985.
