= Avshalom Caspi =

Israeli-American psychologist (born 1960)

- Born: May 5, 1960 (age 66); Jerusalem, Israel
- Education: University of California, Santa Cruz; Cornell University
- Known for: Self-control; Dunedin Multidisciplinary Health and Development Study
- Spouse: Terrie Moffitt
- Awards: (with Terrie Moffitt) 2016 APA Award for Distinguished Scientific Contributions to Psychology
- Scientific career
- Fields: Psychology
- Institutions: Duke University; Institute of Psychiatry, Psychology and Neuroscience at King's College London
- Thesis: Moving against and moving away: life-course patterns of explosive and withdrawn children (1986)

Avshalom Caspi (born May 5, 1960) is an Israeli-American psychologist. He is the Edward M. Arnett Professor of Psychology and Neuroscience in the Trinity College of Arts and Sciences at Duke University and Professor of Personality Development at King's College London's Institute of Psychiatry, Psychology and Neuroscience. His research has focused on mental health and human development, much of which was conducted with his wife and longtime research partner, Terrie Moffitt. He is a co-editor of the Annual Review of Developmental Psychology.

== Education ==
Caspi graduated from the University of California, Santa Cruz with a B.A. in psychology in 1981. He received his M.A. in 1983 and Ph.D. in 1986 in developmental psychology from the Department of Human Development at Cornell University. His doctoral dissertation was titled "Moving Against and Moving Away: Life-course Patterns of Explosive and Withdrawn Children".

== Research ==
Caspi and Moffitt first met when they presented adjacent posters at a 1987 conference in St. Louis, Missouri on "Deviant Pathways from Childhood to Adulthood". He and Moffitt have collaborated on the Dunedin Multidisciplinary Health and Development Study since the 1980s.

Among Caspi's discoveries was that of an association between the 5-HTTLPR polymorphism and clinical depression. This discovery, originally reported in a 2003 study, spurred a wave of subsequent research on the potential genetic roots of various psychiatric conditions. However, a 2017 meta-analysis did not support the original finding, nor did a large analysis with nearly 100% power to detect the original finding. As a result, the general approach of candidate gene or candidate gene by environment interaction research in single small studies is no longer widely accepted.

Another of Caspi's studies concerns the monoamine oxidase A gene variation and the risk of antisocial behavior in the presence of childhood abuse as a study of gene and environment interaction, which was supported by some follow up studies and not by others.

== Honors and awards ==
Caspi is a fellow of the Association for Psychological Science, the British Academy and the Academy of Medical Sciences. He and Moffitt were co-recipients of the 2010 Klaus J. Jacobs Research Prize and Best Practice Award from the Jacobs Foundation, and the 2016 APA Award for Distinguished Scientific Contributions to Psychology. In 2013 Caspi was awarded an honorary doctorate from Tilburg University in the Netherlands. In November 2022 Caspi was awarded the Royal Society Te Apārangi's Rutherford Medal, along with the Dunedin Study team leader Richie Poulton and team members Murray Thomson and Moffitt. As of 2024, he became a co-editor of the Annual Review of Developmental Psychology.
