= Russell L. De Valois =

American scientist

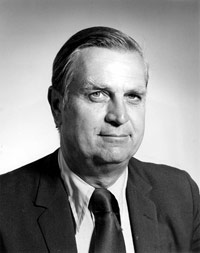
Russell L. De Valois

Russell L. De Valois (December 15, 1926 – September 20, 2003) was an American scientist recognized for his pioneering research on spatial and color vision.

== Biographical ==
Russell De Valois was born in Ames, Iowa, on December 15, 1926. He spent most of his early life in Tamil Nadu, India, where his parents supervised an agricultural missionary station. He attended Highclerc School (now Kodaikanal International School), a boarding school in Kodaikanal, in the mountains of South India.

De Valois attended Oberlin College where he received an A.B. in zoology and physiology and a M.A. in psychology. He continued his education at the University of Michigan, receiving a Ph.D. in physiological psychology in 1952. Following a postdoctoral year in Germany, at the University of Freiburg, De Valois returned to the University of Michigan as research associate and lecturer in psychology and ophthalmology and was one of the first resident scientists at the newly formed Kresge Institute for Research in Ophthalmology. After five years in Ann Arbor, he accepted a faculty appointment in the Department of Psychology at Indiana University, where he remained until 1968. It was during his tenure at Indiana University that Professor De Valois, along with graduate students Gerald Jacobs (now at University of California, Santa Barbara) and Israel Abramov (now at Brooklyn College), began research in how the responses of opponent cells in macaque monkey lateral geniculate nucleus relate to theories of color perception. At Indiana, De Valois met Karen Kennedy whom he married in 1969. His marriage was the beginning of a 34-year partnership and intellectual collaboration.

The final 35 years of De Valois's career were spent at the University of California, Berkeley, where he was professor in the departments of psychology, neurobiology, optometry, and vision science. At Berkeley, De Valois continued his fundamental studies of color vision and, in collaboration with Karen, began a series of investigations of the processing of spatial information in the early stages of the visual system.

On September 20, 2003, De Valois died from injuries suffered in an automobile accident that occurred while he and Karen were returning from Estes Park, Colorado, where they had attended the 60th high school reunion with classmates from the Highclerc School.

== Research ==
=== Color vision ===
During the period 1955 to 1965 at Michigan and Indiana, De Valois developed techniques for measuring both electrophysiological and psychophysical responses of macaque monkeys to chromatic stimuli. In an attempt to understand the neurophysiology underlying color vision, he applied these techniques to evaluate the responses of single cells in the primate visual system. De Valois performed a set of experiments that addressed a scientific controversy that had its roots in the nineteenth-century color vision theories of Young, Helmholtz, and Hering. Starting from observations on color matching, Young and Helmholtz had proposed that color vision was based on the presence of three sets of particles or three types of nervous fibers in the eye that were preferentially sensitive to reds, greens, and blue. Hering, starting from observations on color appearance, had proposed that the percept of color emerged from spectrally-opponent mechanisms in the visual system that contrasted red vs green and blue vs yellow. A number of experiments had shown that the spectral responses of photopigments in the three types of cone cells found in the retina could provide a biophysical correlate for the first stage of trichromatic color vision, an explanation in line with the postulates of Young and Helmholtz. However the discovery of chromatically antagonistic neurons in monkey lateral geniculate nucleus (LGN) by De Valois and his associates demonstrated a neural substrate for a second stage of color processing, similar to that proposed by Hering. In two publications, they described four types of cells: one set that had excitatory responses in the long ("red") wavelength region and inhibitory responses at middle ("green") wavelengths (R+G−), and vice versa (G+ R−); and a second set that had excitatory responses to short ("blue") wavelength and inhibitory responses to middle and long ("yellow") wavelengths B+Y−, and vice versa (Y+ B−). One sees the influence of this work in the 1981 Current Contents designation of his paper, "Analysis of Response Patterns of LGN Cells", as a "Citation Classic"

At Berkeley, De Valois continued his electrophysiological and psychophysical studies of color vision. In a series of studies of monkey vision, De Valois and co-workers measured monkeys' behavioral responses to both chromatic and spatial variations. That the wavelength discrimination and luminance contrast sensitivity measured in monkeys were very similar to those obtained for human observers, allowed De Valois to posit the relevance of his electrophysiological recordings in macaque monkeys to cortical processing in the early stages of the human visual system. Additionally, De Valois demonstrated that many individual cells in primary visual cortex would respond selectively to both color and form. In 1975, Russell and Karen De Valois authored a review article, "Neural Coding of color", providing a summary of the current understanding of neural responses to chromatic stimuli.

De Valois also renewed his interest in the relationship of his earlier LGN recordings to color perception, and was among a number of researchers who realized that the responses of LGN opponent neurons could not quantitatively explain all of the phenomena associated with opponent perceptual processes. In collaboration with Karen De Valois, he proposed a new model to deal with this discrepancy. This model, based on arguments derived from both anatomical and perceptual data, proposed a third stage of color processing by neurons located in the cortex where inputs from LGN ("second-stage") cells were recombined to give a new set of "rotated" color axes consistent with perceptual unique hue judgments and other aspects of opponent perceptual channels. In a series of papers, De Valois and his graduate students pursued electrophysiological correlates of this multi-stage model.

=== Spatial vision ===
At the time of De Valois' move to Berkeley, linear systems analysis was emerging as a tool for studying the early stages of visual processing. Although this technique had long been applied to problems in optics and engineering, vision scientists Fergus Campbell and John Robson measured human sensitivity to patterns of spatial sinusoidal gratings of varying periodicity and first proposed spatial frequency selective "channels" to explain a number of psychophysical phenomena in pattern perception. De Valois, consistent with his conviction that perception must be linked to neuronal responses, seized on these findings and began electrophysiological studies of the mechanisms of early visual processing of form.

In these studies De Valois and his co-workers found support for the conjecture that the early visual system transmits pattern information using a local 2-D spatial frequency or wavelet coding. Among the highlights of this work were that, for neurons in primary visual cortex (V1): i. most have receptive fields corresponding to a limited range of spatial frequencies and orientations; ii. a variety of frequencies and orientations are represented; and iii. responses to some more complex patterns can be predicted by the cell's spatial frequency tuning and the amplitude of the spatial frequency in the Fourier spectrum of the pattern. As in earlier studies, electrophysiological findings were complemented by monkey and human psychophysics. Well into his 70s, De Valois continued to pursue the transformations of visual information in LGN and striate cortex. In studies with N. Cottaris and others, De Valois applied reverse correlation techniques to study transformations of spatial, temporal and chromatic information in LGN and striate cortex.

Functional anatomical studies of visual cortex that employed 2-^{14}C-deoxyglucose autoradiography were another important tool in De Valois' investigations of spatial and chromatic vision. In a series of papers R. Tootell, M. Silverman, E. Switkes, R. De Valois, and others, showed: i. the columnar arrangement of neurons that respond to similar spatial frequencies in striate cortex; ii. the structured relationship of cytochrome-oxidase (CYTOX) rich regions ("blobs and stripes") in primary and secondary visual cortex; and iii. the topographic relationship between CYTOX blobs and neurons tuned to spatial frequency or color. The deoxyglucose studies also provided illustrations of previously known retinotopic organization and ocular dominance columns

A capstone of De Valois' work over the decades of the 1970s and 1980s was the publication of the book Spatial Vision written in collaboration with Karen K. De Valois.

== Recognition ==
De Valois was elected to the Society of Experimental Psychologists (1968), the National Academy of Sciences (1976), and as Fellow of the American Association for the Advancement of Science (1977). De Valois also received the APA Award for Distinguished Scientific Contributions to Psychology in 1977, the Warren Medal from the Society of Experimental Psychologists (1979), the Tillyer Medal from the Optical Society of America (1988), recognition as a William James Fellow of the American Psychological Society (1991), and the Prentice Medal of the American Academy of Optometry (2002).
