= Henry Wellman =

American developmental psychologist

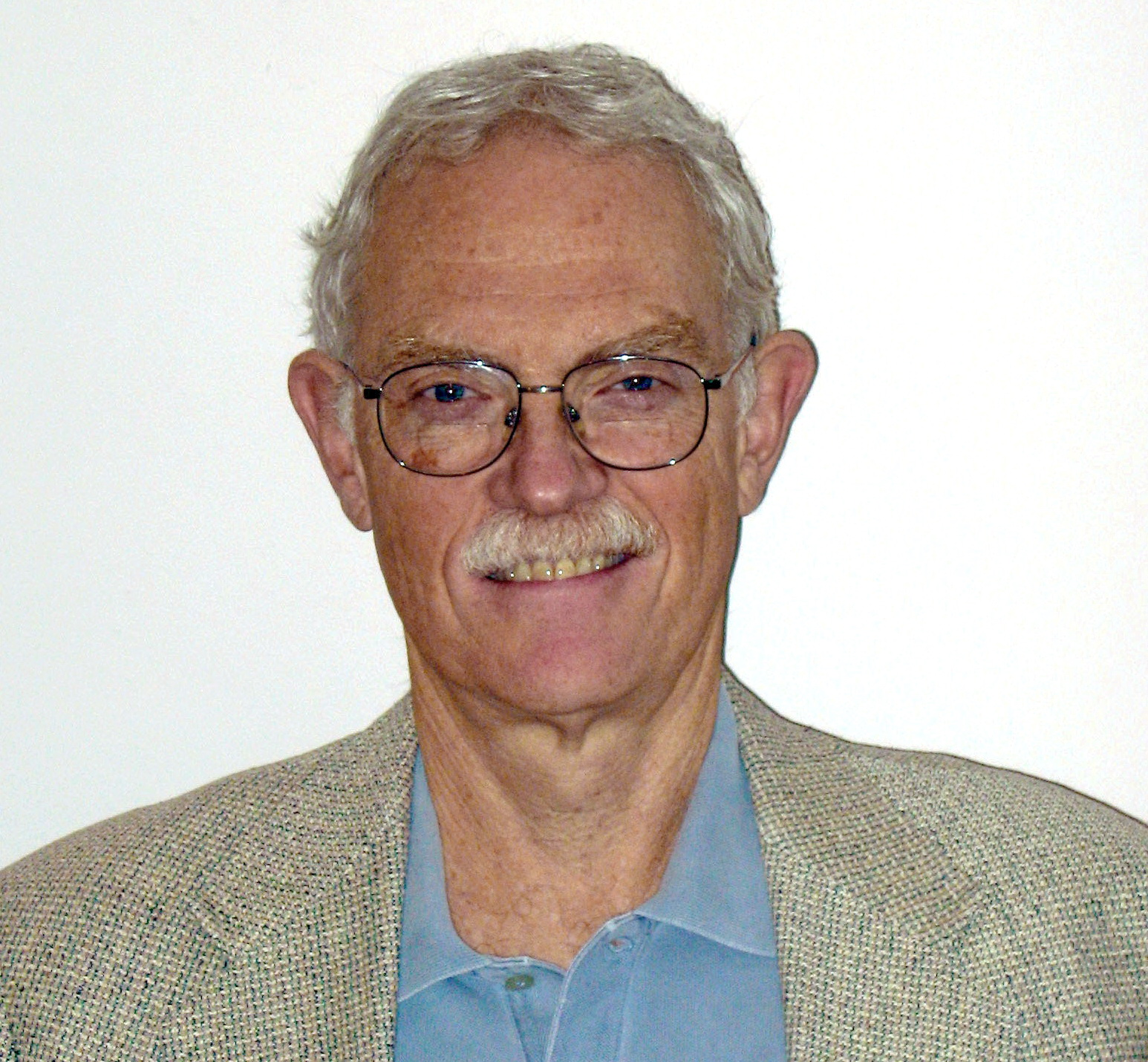
Henry Wellman

Henry M. Wellman is an American psychologist who studies child development. He is the Harold W. Stevenson Collegiate Professor of Psychology at the University of Michigan. Wellman is especially known for his work on theory of mind. He served on the faculty of Arizona State University for two years before joining the Michigan faculty in 1977. He was inducted as a Fellow of the American Academy of Arts and Sciences in 2012.

== Early life and education ==
Wellman was born in Hickory, North Carolina in 1948. His father was a career Marine Corps officer who often moved, so by the time Wellman was in 12th grade, he had attended 11 different schools in North Carolina, Virginia, Maryland, California, and Hawaii. The Marines are the U.S. experts in amphibious warfare, so much of his childhood was spent close to one beach or another. He has said that going to the beach remains one of his favorite travel activities. He graduated high school in a small town in the Mojave Desert of California, 29 Palms, adjacent to Joshua Tree National Park; visiting deserts is his second favorite travel activity.

Wellman received his undergraduate degree from Pomona College (1970), then spent time as a kindergarten and preschool teacher, before and while going to graduate school. He received his Ph.D. from the Institute of Child Development at the University of Minnesota (1975) where his advisor was John Flavell. It was with Flavell that he began his studies of children’s cognitive development and especially their understanding of the world around them, focusing eventually on their social cognition, their understanding of persons, actions, and their inner, mental workings.

== Theory of Mind work ==
Theory of mind refers to our everyday human understanding of people in terms of the internal mental states (beliefs, desires, emotions, intentions) that produce and explain their actions, interaction, and social learning. Because humans are such a social species, social cognition is an ever-present part of our thinking and lives, beginning in infancy and developing dynamically throughout childhood. Wellman and a small handful of others pioneered early research on theory of mind in the 1980s, and he has contributed to it consistently ever since.

His first book on the topic, The Child’s Theory of Mind (1990), helped launch the field and has been cited more than 4000 times. What began as a relatively small and self-contained area of research has expanded tremendously since then, as researchers have documented links between theory of mind and other crucial issues, such as children’s everyday conversations, their social actions, moral development, religious ideas, social skills and adjustment, as well as species differences, and the nature of human cognitive universals. Wellman’s work is known throughout the world and has inspired researchers worldwide to investigate questions related to theory of mind and how it may operate in different cultures.

His other books include Children Talk about the Mind (1995; with Karen Bartsch), and Making Minds (2014), which won both the Cognitive Development Society Book Award and APA’s Eleanor Maccoby Book Award. His 2020 book, Reading Minds (with Karen Lind), is intended for a widespread non-academic audience and is being translated into 7 other languages (including Chinese, Korean, Spanish, and Portuguese). These books track our expanding knowledge of theory of mind over 30 years and chart the expanding scope and impact of theory-of-mind research and scholarship, which has spread from psychology into philosophy, anthropology, neuroscience, primatology, and discussions of human evolution.

Wellman has also contributed more than 100 journal articles to the field. His 2001 “Meta-Analysis of Theory-of-Mind Development: The Truth about False Belief” (with David Cross and Juleanne Watson), has been cited nearly 5000 times and was one of the journal Child Development’s top 10 most cited articles in the history of the journal, which began publication in 1930.

Wellman’s work on theory of mind began as a collaboration with Carl Johnson while they were in graduate school. His research has been collaborative ever since, most notably with Susan Gelman (University of Michigan), Paul Harris (Harvard), Alison Gopnik (University of California, Berkeley), and Candida Peterson (University of Queensland).

== Honors ==
Wellman is past-president of the Cognitive Development Society, recipient of a prestigious NIH MERIT Award, along with awards from the Cattell and the Rockefeller Foundations. He is the 2012 recipient of the G. Stanley Hall Award for lifetime contributions to developmental science from the American Psychological Association (APA). He is also a Fellow of the American Academy of Arts and Sciences and a recipient of the University of Michigan's Distinguished Faculty Achievement Award. That Award reads (in part), “A path-breaking and outstanding scholar, Henry Wellman embodies the intellectual ideals of commitment, intellectual sharing, and rigorous research.”

Wellman also won APS’s Mentoring Award. He claims this is his favorite award as he believes that mentoring is his proudest contribution to the field. His former students have gone on to become researchers and teachers at large universities (University of Texas, University of California, New York University, Northwestern University) and small liberal arts colleges (Bard College, Lewis & Clark College, Pitzer College) as well as non-academic jobs (Children’s Television Workshop, Disney, Facebook).

== Personal life ==
Wellman lives in Ann Arbor, Michigan with his wife, Karen Lind. He has two sons, Ned, a professor in the Business School at Arizona State University, and Daniel, a lecturer in Chemistry at Pomona College. He also has four grandchildren.
