= Angeline Lillard =

American developmental psychologist

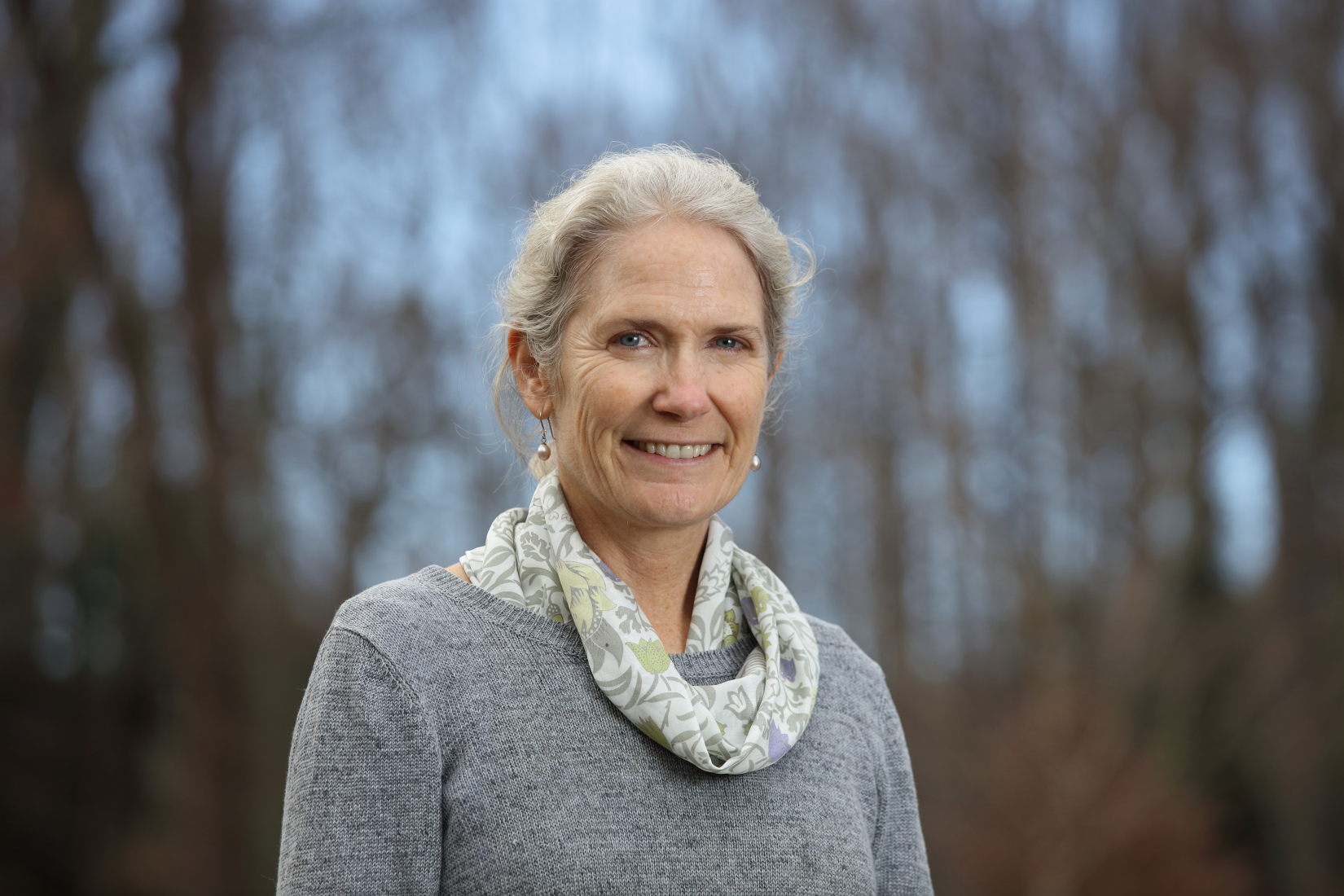
- Born: Angeline Stoll Lillard

Academic background
- Education: Smith College; Stanford University
- Thesis: Young children's conceptualization of pretend (1991)
- Doctoral advisor: John H. Flavell

Angeline Stoll Lillard is an American developmental psychologist who researches Montessori education and child development. She is currently professor of psychology and director of the Early Development Laboratory at the University of Virginia. Her research and writing explores these topics in a number of respects including learning through pretend play, the efficacy and impact of Montessori vs non-Montessori schools, and equitable access to Montessori education. Lillard is an elected fellow of the American Association for the Advancement of Science, the American Psychological Association, and the Association for Psychological Science.

In addition to her academic publications, she is the author of Montessori: The Science Behind the Genius - applying modern academic research to evaluate Maria Montessori's theories of education. The book was awarded the Cognitive Development Society Book Award in 2006.

== Biography ==
Lillard completed her PhD under the supervision of John Flavell at Stanford University in 1991. Her dissertation research, focusing on young children's mental representations of pretend play, was awarded the American Psychological Association's Outstanding Dissertation Award of 1992, and later the Boyd McCandless Award for early contributions to developmental science.

Lillard began her career in academia at the University of San Francisco, where she served as assistant professor of psychology from 1991 to 1995. She was then awarded funding by the National Science Foundation to serve as a visiting professor of psychology at University of California, Berkeley for one year. At the conclusion of that role, Lillard moved to the University of Virginia, where she has remained since.

Her scientific work has appeared in journals such as the Psychological Bulletin, Science, Pediatrics, and Psychological Science, and has been featured in popular press outlets including Nightline, The Washington Post, Forbes, and Slate. Lillard is a frequent keynote speaker at psychology, Montessori, and education conferences nationally and internationally.

=== Research ===
Lillard's primary research interests include Montessori education and children's pretend play. She is also interested in the development of theory of mind, children's executive function, children and media, neuroplasticity, contemplative practices, and culture and development. Her research has been funded by sources like the National Institutes of Health, National Science Foundation, Institute for Educational Sciences, and the Wildflower Foundation Research Partner Grant.

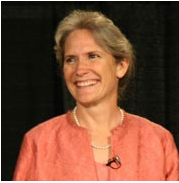
Lillard

=== Honors and awards ===
- UVA Research Achievement Award, 2021
- University of Virginia College Fellow, 2021-2024
- Fellow, American Association for the Advancement of Science, 2020
- Public Voices Fellow, The Op-Ed Project, University of Virginia, 2018–19
- Fellow, American Psychological Association, 2011
- Cognitive Development Society Book Award, 2006, for Montessori: The Science Behind the Genius
- Fellow, Association for Psychological Science, 2006
- James McKeen Cattell Sabbatical Fellow, 2005-2006
- Life Academy Fellow (Max Planck-Berlin, Universities of Michigan, Virginia, Zurich, Humboldt, and Frei University-Berlin), 2005
- British Psychological Society Visiting Fellow, 2003
- Max Planck Institute for Evolutionary and Cultural Psychology, Leipzig, Visiting Fellow, 2003
- University Teaching Fellow, University of Virginia, 1999-2000
- American Psychological Association Boyd McCandless Young Scientist Award, 1999
- Visiting Scientist, Japan Developmental Psychology Society, Tokyo, 1998
- American Psychological Association Outstanding Dissertation Award (Division 7), 1992

== Bibliography ==
=== Book ===
Lillard authored Montessori: The Science Behind the Genius, presently in its 3rd edition (2017). The book has been translated into languages including Chinese, Vietnamese, French and Turkish. It was awarded the Cognitive Development Society Book Award in 2006.

In her book, Lillard presents Montessori's theoretical principles, the scientific research that has followed them, and how they are implemented in a Montessori classroom. She also highlights research concerning eight insights that are foundational to Montessori education and describes how each of these insights is applied in the Montessori classroom.

=== Selected publications ===
- Snyder, A; Tong, X; Lillard, AS (2022). "Standardized test performance in public Montessori schools". Journal of School Choice. 16 (1). doi:10.1080/15582159.2021.1958058.
- Lillard, AS; Meyer, MJ; Vasc, D; Fukuda, E (2021). "An association between Montessori education in childhood and adult wellbeing". Frontiers in Psychology. 12 721943. doi:10.3389/fpsyg.2021.721943. PMC 8656358. PMID 34899465.
- Lillard, A; Heise, M; Richey, E; Tong, X; Hart, A; Bray, P (2017). "Montessori preschool elevates and equalizes child outcomes: A longitudinal study". Frontiers in Psychology. 8 1783. doi:10.3389/fpsyg.2017.01783. PMC 5670361. PMID 29163248.
- Lillard, A; Else-Quest, N (2006). "The early years: Evaluating Montessori education". Science. 313 (5795): 1893–1894. doi:10.1126/science.1132362. PMID 17008512.
