= Phil Silva =

New Zealand paediatrician and psychologist (1940–2025)

Phil Silva OBE
- Born: Philip Anthony Silva; 22 August 1940; Cromwell, New Zealand
- Died: 12 June 2025 (aged 84); Christchurch, New Zealand
- Education: University of Otago
- Known for: Founder and inaugural director of the Dunedin Multidisciplinary Health and Development Study
- Scientific career
- Fields: Child development; educational psychology
- Workplaces: University of Otago
- Thesis: Some neurological and psychological characteristics of children who were preterm and small for gestational age : a multi-disciplinary study (1978)

Philip Anthony Silva OBE (22 August 1940 – 12 June 2025) was a New Zealand psychologist, educator and researcher. He was the founder and director of the Dunedin Multidisciplinary Health and Development Study (known as the Dunedin Study) from 1972 to 1999.

== Early life and career ==
Phil Silva was born in Cromwell, New Zealand to Herbert Frederick Silva, a metallurgist, and Ella Theodore Angermunde, a shop assistant. He was the second eldest of eight siblings. His parents divorced in 1946. He was educated at Otago Boys' High School, and went on to study at the Dunedin Teachers' College.

Silva worked as a primary school teacher for eight years, and earned a Master of Arts degree from the University of Otago in 1968. His master's thesis was titled The S.R.A. reading laboratories: an experimental investigation into the effectiveness of the S.R.A. reading laboratories in Dunedin intermediate schools. He spent five years as a psychologist, and in 1971 began working with Patricia Buckfield in the University of Otago Dunedin School of Medicine's Department of Paediatrics on a small study (225 subjects) of child development. That led to his PhD degree in 1978, with a thesis titled Some neurological and psychological characteristics of children who were preterm and small for gestational age: a multi-disciplinary study, and his founding in 1972 of the Dunedin Multidisciplinary Health and Development Study, a long-term research investigation of human health, development and behaviour. Silva served as its study's director until his retirement in 1999.

=== Significance and impact ===
Under Silva's direction, the Dunedin Study evolved into one of the most comprehensive investigations of human health and development ever conducted.

Upon his retirement, Silva was named director emeritus of the Dunedin Study, and took on the role of national chair of the Drug and Alcohol Resistance Education (DARE) Foundation. He fully retired in 2006, and moved to Nelson where he lived on a yacht and served as Commodore of the Tasman Bay Cruising Club.

== Personal life and death ==
Silva had six children with his first wife, the late Wendy Crane. His son Tim Silva was born during the study's founding year and became one of the 1,037 participants in the Dunedin Study. Tim stated he had "a particularly strong affiliation with the study" due to his father's role as founder. Jeremy Silva recalled his father's work ethic, noting that Silva would spend weekends repairing the condemned building that initially housed the study. He described his father's persistence, "Dad was like a cork in a bucket they just keep pushing him down and he keeps popping up".

Silva later moved to Christchurch, where he died on 12 June 2025, at the age of 84.

== Honours and awards ==
Silva was appointed an Officer of the Order of the British Empire in the 1994 Queen's Birthday Honours, for services to health education.

In 2016, the Dunedin Study was awarded the Prime Minister's Science Prize, and in 2022 it was awarded the Rutherford Medal of the Royal Society Te Apārangi.

== Research and publications ==
Silva authored and co-authored numerous publications based on the Dunedin Study. His most cited works include "From Child to Adult: The Dunedin Multidisciplinary Health and Development Study" (1996), which he co-edited with W.R. Stanton; "A longitudinal study of children with developmental language delay at age three: later intelligence, reading and behaviour problems" (1987); "The Dunedin Multidisciplinary Health and Development Study: A 15 year longitudinal study" (1990); and "Sex Differences in Antisocial Behaviour: Conduct disorder, delinquency, and violence in the Dunedin Longitudinal Study" (2001), co-authored with T.E. Moffitt, A. Caspi, and M. Rutter.

Silva served on the board of the Hearing Health Foundation for over 50 years. As a professor at Auckland University of Technology, he helped establish the Pacific Island Families Study.

== Legacy ==
Silva's legacy endures through the Dunedin Study, which he conceived and nurtured through its critical early decades. He has described the study as "a gift to the world".

Research from the study has produced over 1,300 publications and reports, many of which have influenced policy and practice in health, education, criminal justice, and social services.

Silva's vision of a comprehensive, multidisciplinary approach to studying human development established a model for longitudinal research that has been emulated worldwide. His commitment to treating participants with respect and dignity created a strong foundation of trust that enabled the study to maintain a high retention rate over five decades. The ongoing research continues to provide insights into how early life experiences influence health and wellbeing in later life.
