= Sandra Waxman =

American cognitive psychologist

- Born: 1954 (age 71–72)
- Education: University of Pennsylvania; Johns Hopkins University
- Scientific career
- Fields: Cognitive and developmental psychology
- Workplaces: Northwestern University; Harvard University

Sandra Robin Waxman (born 1954) is an American cognitive and developmental psychologist. She is a Louis W. Menk Professor of Psychology at Northwestern University in Evanston, Illinois, and director of the university's Infant and Child Development Center (formerly Project on Child Development). She is known for her work on the development of language and concepts in infants and children.

== Education and career ==
Waxman received her bachelor's degree from the University of Pennsylvania in 1976. She earned her master's degree from Johns Hopkins University in 1981 and her doctorate from the University of Pennsylvania in 1985. From 1986 to 1992 she was a faculty member of the psychology department at Harvard University.

In 1992 Waxman left Harvard for Northwestern University's Department of Psychology. Along with Douglas Medin, she cofounded Northwestern's Program in Culture, Language, and Cognition in 2000. The program involves several schools and departments at the university, and supports research on the relationships between language, cultural processes, and higher cognitive processes. Waxman also holds a joint appointment in the School of Education and Social Policy at Northwestern. In 2013, she was elected as Fellow at Northwestern's Institute for Policy Research. She is a founding co-editor of the Annual Review of Developmental Psychology.

Waxman is the recipient of numerous national and international awards. She was awarded a James McKeen Cattell Fellowship to support her work about how young children from different cultures come to understand the natural world, and a Guggenheim Fellowship for her exceptional scholarship. In 2008 she received the Ann L. Brown Award for Excellence in Developmental Research from the University of Illinois. In 2011 she was elected as a fellow of both the American Academy of Arts and Sciences and the American Association for the Advancement of Sciences in recognition of her contributions to the fields of developmental and cognitive psychology.

== Research ==
Sandra Waxman is the director of the Infant and Child Development Center at Northwestern University (established 1992), where her research is focused on early linguistic and conceptual development. The primary focus of her work at the Infant and Child Development Center is to examine human infants’ and young children's natural ability to build complex, flexible, and creative systems – both cognitive and linguistic - and to establish links between them. In a separate but related line of research, Waxman and colleagues investigate how preschool and school-aged children acquire concepts about the natural world.

=== Early linguistic and conceptual development ===
Waxman has focused specifically on infants’ acquisition of concepts (e.g., dog, blue, or running) and the words that describe them to establish what cognitive and linguistic capacities are available to infants and young children from the very start, and how they are fine-tuned by the shaping force of their experience.

Together with colleagues, she has documented that even before infants begin to speak, their cognitive and language capacities are powerfully linked, and that these early links, which set the foundation for subsequent learning, are shaped importantly by experience – including infants' experience acquiring their particular native language. Waxman and colleague Dana Markow's 1995 "Words as invitations to form categories: Evidence from 12-month-old infants" (Cognitive Psychology, 29, 257–302.) helped establish a foundation for future exploration by other researchers. This work has been cited over 200 times, as documented by Thomson Reuters Web of Knowledge.

=== Children’s understandings of the natural world ===
Since 2002, Waxman and her colleagues have focused on preschool and school-aged children to investigate how our most fundamental concepts of the natural world—concepts such as what it means to be alive, or the understanding of the relationship between humans and animals—unfold. This collaborative venture involves children from diverse linguistic and cultural communities in the US (including rural and urban children of European and Native American descent) and abroad (including children from indigenous communities in South America, Central America, and Indonesia). Waxman and her colleagues have found cultural and linguistic differences as well as commonalities in children's understandings of the natural world. This work also underscores the vital role of experience in learning.

=== Implications ===
Waxman's continuing research on the relation between early language and cognitive development in children from diverse linguistic and cultural communities provides a foundation for further applications, including early interventions in atypical development (e.g., language delay) and the promotion of positive developmental outcomes and optimal learning environments for all children. Her continuing work focusing on children and their understanding of the natural world provides a springboard for the development of science education curricula and policy. To design effective science curricula, especially for classrooms that include children from diverse cultural backgrounds, it is important to understand what knowledge children bring to the classrooms, and for curricula to be culturally and linguistically responsive.

== Selected publications ==
Early linguistic and conceptual development:

- Waxman, S. R., & Markow, D. B. (1995). Words as invitations to form categories: Evidence from 12-month-old infants. Cognitive Psychology, 29, 257–302.
- Ferry, A., Hespos, S., & Waxman, S. (2010). Categorization in 3- and 4-Month-Old Infants: An Advantage of Words Over Tones. Child Development.81(2), 472–479.
- Waxman, S.R., Lidz, J., Braun, I. E., Lavin, T.(2009) Twenty-four-month-old infants’ interpretations of novel verbs and nouns in dynamic scenes. Cognitive Psychology. 59(1), 67–95.
- Waxman, S. R. & Guasti, M. T. (2009). Nouns, adjectives and the acquisition of meaning: New evidence from Italian-acquiring children. Language Learning and Development 5 (1), 50–68.

Children's understandings of the natural world:

- Herrmann, P., Waxman, S.R., & Medin, D.L. (2010). Anthropocentrism is not the first step in children's reasoning about the natural world. Proceedings of the National Academy of Sciences. 107 (22), 9979–9984.
- Anggoro, F., Medin, D. & Waxman, S. (2010). Language and Experience Influence Children's Biological Induction. Journal of Cognition and Culture. 10, 171–187.
- Unsworth, S. J., Levin, W., Bang, M., Washinawatok, K., Waxman, S. R., & Medin, D. L. (2012). Cultural differences in children's ecological reasoning and psychological closeness to nature: Evidence from Menominee and European-American children. Journal of Cognition and Culture. 12(1-2),17-29.
