= Kodaikanal International School =

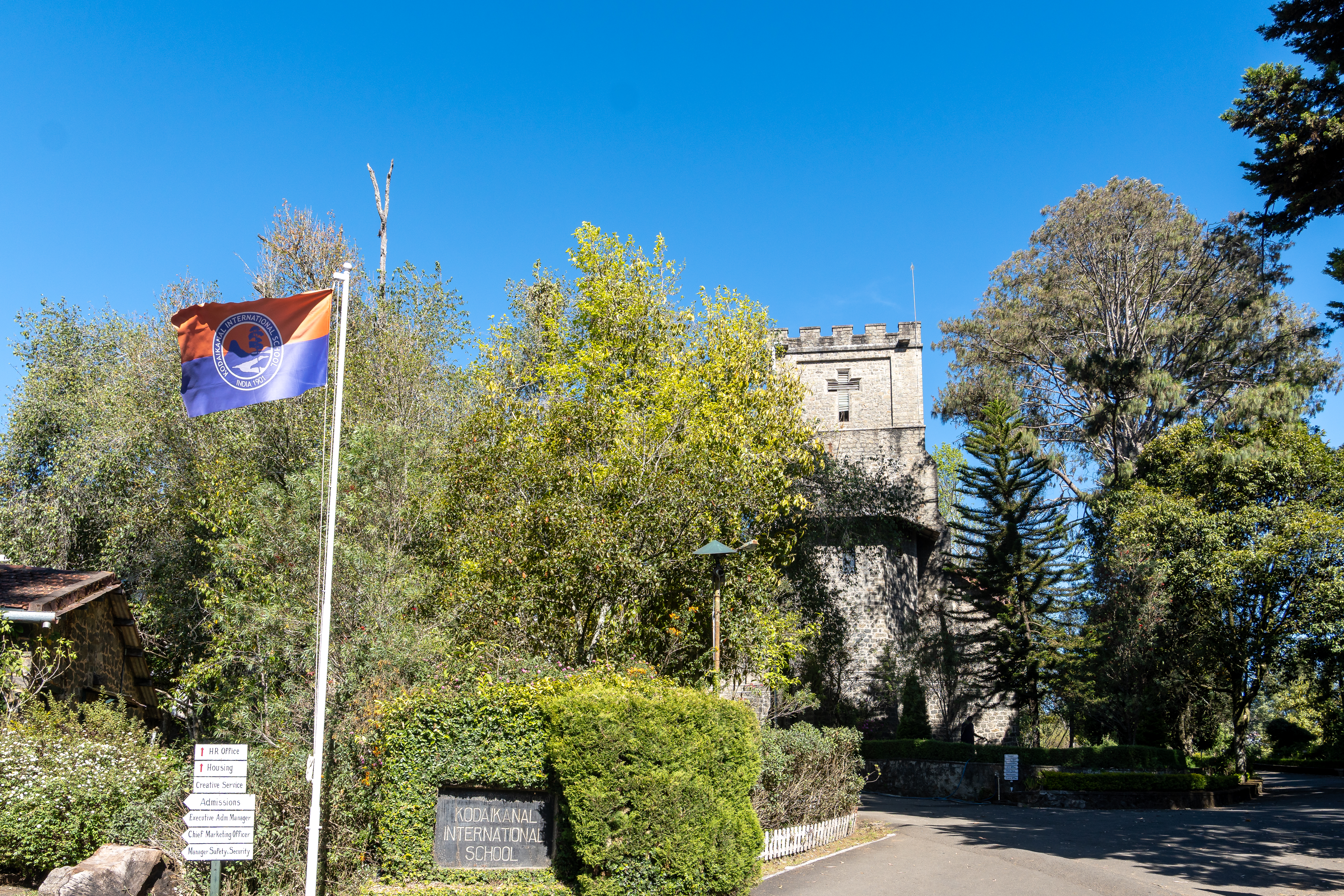

Location
- PO Box 25, Seven Roads Junction; Kodaikanal, Tamil Nadu 624 101; India; 10°14′7″N 77°29′21″E

Information
- Type: Independent School, Residential School
- Motto: Unity in Diversity
- Religious affiliation: Christian
- Established: 1901
- Founder: Margaret Eddy
- Chairperson: Dr. John Thomas
- Dean: Capt. Harish Pillai
- Principal: Dr. Bradford Barnhardt
- Chaplain: Raja Krishnamoorthy
- Faculty: 157
- Grades: P–12
- Gender: Coeducational
- Enrollment: 568 total 439 boarding 129 day-scholars
- Average class size: 19 students
- Student to teacher ratio: 8:1
- Language: English
- Campuses: 2
- Campus: Residential Campus; 43 acres (0.17 km^{2}); 47 buildings
- Houses: 3 (Blue, Orange, White)
- Colours: Blue, Orange, and White
- Song: The KIS Song
- Athletics: 8 Interscholastic sports 15 Interscholastic teams
- Mascot: The Tahr
- Newspaper: The Tahr Tribune, The Highclerc Herald
- Yearbook: The Eucalyptus ("The Eucy")
- Tuition: INR 13,00,000 to 17,00,000
- Website: kis.in

Kodaikanal International School (KIS) is a co-educational independent residential school offering education for grades P-12. It is located on 43 acres (0.17 km^{2}) in Kodaikanal, Dindigul, Tamil Nadu, India. Kodaikanal is a hill station at 2,133 m (6,998 ft) in the Palani Hills, 121 kilometres (75 mi) northwest of Madurai.

Early alumni of KIS include US Ambassador to India Robert F. Goheen (1936) and US Senator Chris Van Hollen (1977).

In 1975, KIS became the first school in India to offer the International Baccalaureate Diploma Program (IB) and the IB Middle Years Program (MYP). It also awards its own certificate, the KIS Diploma, to all graduates. It is accredited by the Middle States Association of Colleges and Schools (US) and recognized by the Association of Indian Universities.

The current principal is Bradford (Dr. Brad) Barnhardt.

== History ==
=== Origins (1890–1919) ===
Margaret Eddy, founding principal of Kodaikanal International School (1901)

The original "Highclerc School", ca. 1906

In the early 1880s, there was a great need for an English-medium school in South India, due to an ever-increasing Christian mission community in the area. Having a school at a hill-station would allow the children of missionaries to escape the tropical diseases that were claiming the lives of so many, and provide a cool and open atmosphere that stimulated learning.

In the early months of the year 1900, a woman by the name of Margaret Eddy came to visit her son Sherwood (after whom Sherwood Dormitory is named), who was working as a missionary in Batlagundu. Seeing the need for a school, and also realising that the missionaries could not find the means to establish one, she decided to begin the process herself. She held the first Kodaikanal Conference on 1 June 1901, in which she established a Committee whose duty it was to find teachers and a building in which schooling would be held.

After commissioning The Highclerc Hotel as a building more than a year later, under the leadership of Mrs. Margaret Eddy, "Highclerck School" was opened to students on 1 July 1901. By 1902 the owners of the building had drastically increased the rent, so the school was moved to Rock Cottage and Central House. In 1905, Mrs. Eddy returned to Kodaikanal, and was able to buy The Highclerc Hotel from its new owner for INR 29,000 along with 3.5 acres (14,000 m^{2}) of land. Since that time the school has remained in its present location. Mrs. Eddy served as principal of Kodai School, without salary, from 1901 to 1905, when she was forced to return to the America due to a sickness.

=== Development (1920–1959) ===
Significant development of the school that began in the late 1920s, when land acquisitions provided dormitory accommodation and facilities for the growing school, continued during the next three decades. By 1930, the school had fully expanded into a high-school accommodating preschool through grade twelve, and that same year, Tracy Manley became the first student to receive a High School Diploma from Kodai School. In 1944, Dayavu Dhanapal became the first Indian woman staff member to join the school.

=== Internationalization (1960–1989) ===
The 1960s marked the beginning of a new era in the school's history; a period of revolutionising social changes. In 1960, Herb Krause, whose grand daughter is a Kodai School graduate and a former teacher at the school, took the role of principal after ten years as a teacher. Krause's goal was to open the school up to students of all nationalities and religions – a movement away from the traditional American Christian image the school had had. In 1966, a committee was established to improve the curriculum, staff and instructional material of the school, and it was accredited by the Middle States Association of Colleges and Schools in 1968 as a result of the committee's work. A new merit/demerit disciplinary system was introduced as a "supplementary system of discipline and guide to staff members" – a very controversial standardisation of disciplinary consequences.

Another major change in the school occurred during this time – nationalism was becoming more and more visible in the world, and the American missionary exodus from India began. This debased the Kodai School community in a way that could not have been expected. The nature of the Kodai School student body needed to change in order to meet enrolment needs and budget realities. Herb Krause began visiting New Delhi, Bangkok and Beirut. Several international companies endowed grants upon the school in return for guaranteed places for students. Consequently, a student body of a more diverse and cosmopolitan background developed.

This led to a new debate about religious freedom, having to do with the fundamental mission and purpose of the school. The Kodai School staff were divided into two groups: one supporting a mandatory Christian curriculum, with the other supporting religious freedom. When the new chaplain, Robert Dewey, arrived in 1965, the issue came to a head. Dewey merged the ideals of a Christian school and religious freedom: he once said "creative dialogue is absolutely essential if the school is going to be what it wants to be. It is the only word that I know that suggests educationally and experientially what the school can be and is at its best".

Robert Carman ('48) worked with Frank Jayasinghe, the new Director of Development, to produce Project Design, a document which outlined the mission, philosophy, and expectations of students within the school. In 1972, Kodai School was renamed "Kodaikanal International School", and it became the first international school in India. When Jayasinghe took over as Principal in 1973, he continued Krause's campaign for students – enrolment increased from 279 students in 1975 to 475 in 1985.

In 1974 KIS became the first school in India to adopt the International Baccalaureate Diploma Program. In 1977 the first KIS students sat for the first IB examinations in India. Another significant development was the recognition of the KIS High School Diploma by the All India University Board in 1981 and by a number of individual universities in India.

=== Recent history (1990–present) ===
In 1994, Project Design (1974) was revised and renamed Design '94. Design '94 stands today as "the statement of the mission, philosophy, goals and objectives of KIS". In 2006, KIS officially was granted its request to follow the IB Middle Years Program curriculum for grades 6–10, and it began issuing MYP Diplomas. KIS also offers the IB Primary Years Programme (PYP) for grades 1–5. As of 2014, KIS offers all 3 programs of the IB Curriculum viz. the PYP, MYP and the IBDP. KIS also offers the KIS High School Diploma which is awarded to all graduating students who don't opt for the IB Diploma. KIS has a current strength of 440 students and 127 teaching staff. The staff and students come from over 25 different nationalities and from every continent.

== Extracurricular activities ==
=== Robotics team ===
The KIS Robotics Team is a group of robotics students who compete annually in the Interschool Robotics Junior competition that is held by Tetronics, Ltd, in Bangalore. The team also competes in the International School robotics competition in Seoul, South Korea.

=== Social Experience ===
Since the 1960s, KIS social awareness has taken the form of various community service programs, social studies focus and development education courses in the curriculum. Manual Labor program, Youth Corps, Community Experience program and today's Social Experience program, or SoEx, have all been tried over the years with varying degrees of success. Leaders in the Indian development field have contributed to workshops and retreats for staff and students. SoEx groups have worked in orphanages, taught and assisted in local school support programs and been involved in village planning and tribal community development projects. Every Saturday, there is a SoEx activity in which all students can voluntarily participate; such as a visit to the Shenbaganur Orphanage, the Mercy Home, or the village school.

=== Student Council (StudCo) ===
The Student Council (StudCo) is a group of students representative of the high-school student body (grades 9–12). StudCo meets weekly to discuss school issues, rules, and student concerns. Any student is free to request that StudCo focus on a certain issue. Representatives of StudCo from each grade address each of the four high-school grades individually every Monday at an evening meeting. The members of StudCo are elected democratically by the student body and stand as representatives of the entire student population.

=== Middle-school Council (MidCo) ===
The Middle-school Council (MidCo) is a group of students representative of the middle-school student body (grades 6–8). MidCo meets weekly to discuss school issues, rules, and student concerns. Any student is free to request that MidCo focus on a certain issue.

=== Financial aid ===
Financial aid is provided to scholarship students.

== Campus facilities ==
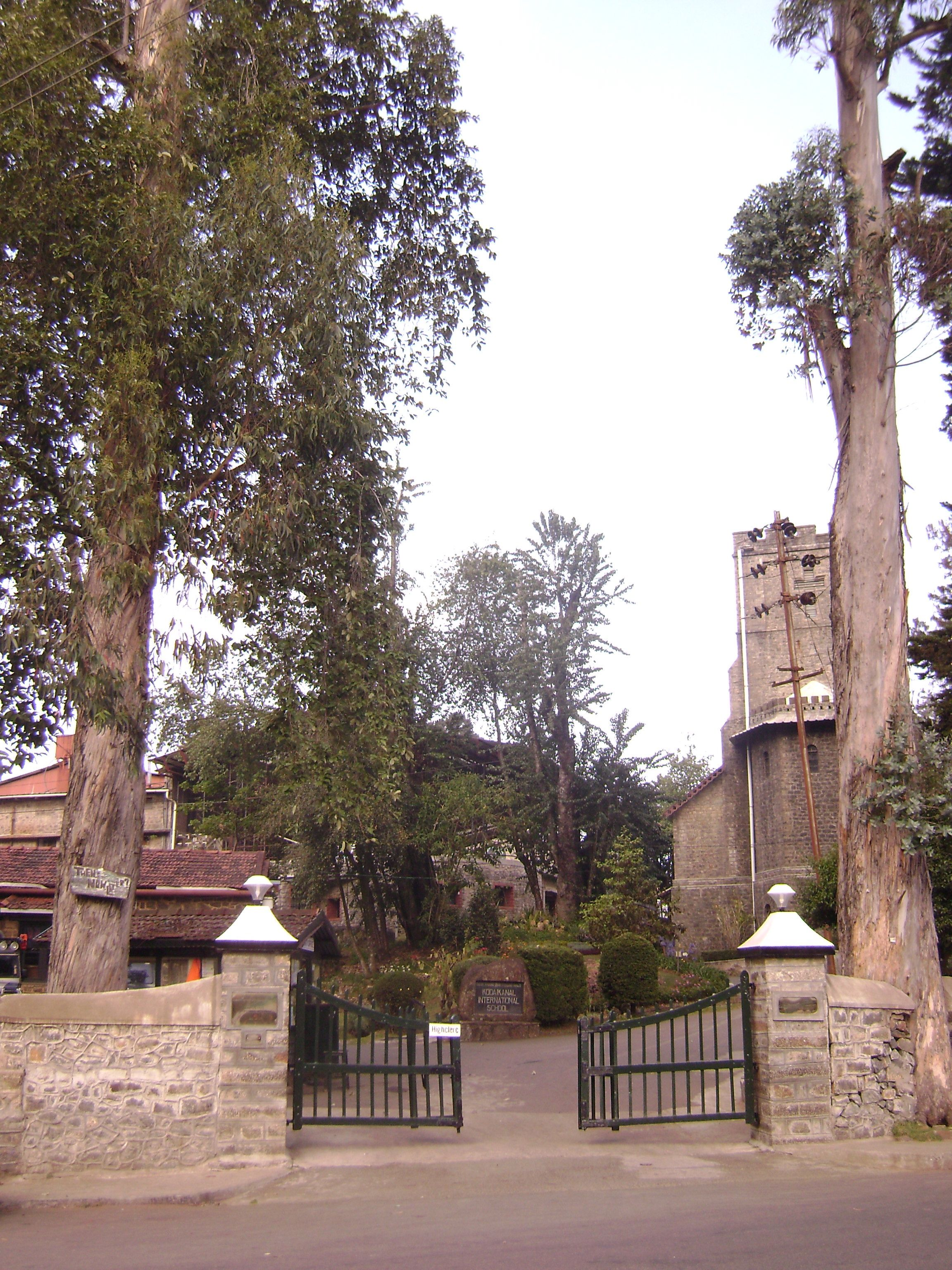
Main entrance gate to Highclerc Campus

KIS is divided into two academic campuses: The Highclerc Campus for its high school (grades 9–12) and Ganga Campus for its elementary school (grades P-5) and middle school (grades 6–8). KIS also incorporates a Wilderness Camp, which offers outdoor education programs for students. It is located in the forest two hours away from Kodaikanal, near the village of Poondi. Highclerc Campus overlooks the large Kodaikanal Lake and the rest of the town of Kodaikanal.

== Partnership and student exchange ==
KIS has since 2008/2009 a partnership and student exchange with the following German institutions:Gymnasium Andreanum in Hildesheim and the Evangelisches Schulzentrum Leipzig in Leipzig. In addition, there is a French Exchange for students in the 10th grade, which allows for a 3-month stay in Lorient, France. A 2-week exchange, open to 9-10th grade students, in Italy is also available.

== Charity ==
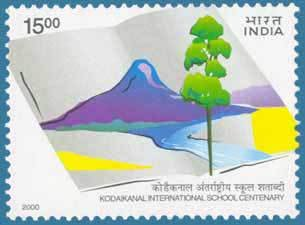
Kodaikanal International School Centenary stamp, 2000

Many NGOs are based within Kodiakanal and the school often has programs in which students will help these charities through documentation and the raising of funds.

== Notable alumni ==
- William D. Coleman (1915–2001), pastor
- Robert F. Goheen (1919–2008), academic and ambassador
- Russell L. De Valois (1926–2008), pioneering research scientist on spatial and color vision
- Eugene Irschick (born 1934), Professor Emeritus, UC Berkeley
- Romulus Whitaker (born 1943), conservationist
- Michael Aung-Thwin (1946-2021), Burmese historian and academic
- Stephen R. Donaldson (born 1947), American novelist
- S. Ashok Kumar (1947–2000), judge
- Kai Bird (born 1951), American author and columnist
- Chris Granner (born 1957), Composer and sound designer
- Chris Van Hollen (born 1959), American politician
- Ashok Kamte (1965-2008), IPS Officer (Maharashtra Cadre)
- Sajeeb Wazed (born 1971), Bangladeshi businessman and politician
- Arjun Rampal (born 1972), Indian actor, model, film producer and television personality
- Ram Kapoor (born 1973), actor
- Aatish Taseer (born 1980), writer
- Zayed Khan (born 1980), former Indian actor and producer
- Esha Deol (born 1981), actor and model
- Pawo Choyning Dorji (born 1983), Bhutanese filmmaker and photographer
- Taaha Shah (born 1987), actor and model
- Leeza Mangaldas (born 1990), sex educator and sports reporter
