= Thelma Alper =

American clinical psychologist (1908–1988)

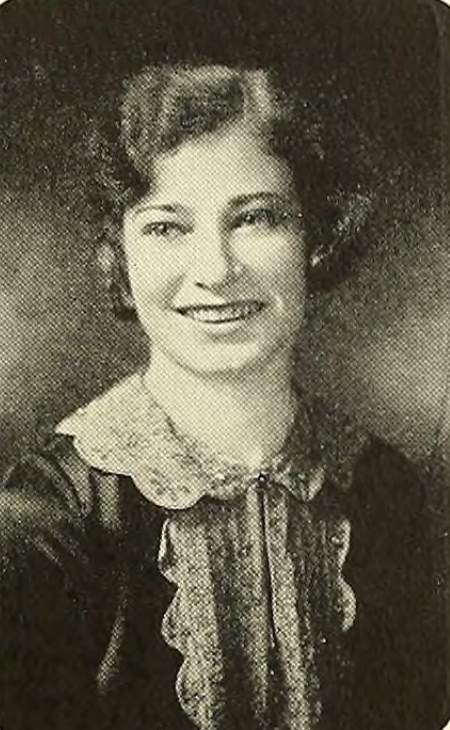
- Born: Thelma Gorfinkle; July 24, 1908; Chelsea, Massachusetts, U.S.
- Died: July 30, 1988 (aged 80); Boston, Massachusetts, U.S.

Academic background
- Education: Wellesley College; Harvard University
- Doctoral advisor: Edwin Boring

Academic work
- Doctoral students: John H. Flavell

Thelma Gorfinkle Alper (July 24, 1908 – July 30, 1988) was an American clinical psychologist, known for creating a study measure for women's achievement motivation. She was also the first Jewish woman to receive a Ph.D. from Harvard, having careers at multiple institutions as she conducted studies primarily on memory of tasks, with an interest in its relation to women.

== Personal life ==
Alper grew up in Chelsea, Massachusetts, in a Jewish family that Alper described as an "achievement oriented, but not at all a college-oriented, Jewish family". She had a sister that was ten years older, named Bertha, who has been described as the most influential role model in Alper's life, yet someone who she could never dream to surpass or even match in her own achievements. Bertha was valedictorian and graduated at sixteen with the intention to attempt a career in business; she was more outgoing than her sister. It was Bertha who persuaded Alper to follow the college prep track in high school.

Alper was a professor's assistant in college, and was later promoted to the position of general assistant for the psychology department of Wellesley College. She also worked for the Judge Baker Guidance Center in Boston for free before getting her B.A. and M.A. later on. She married Abraham T. Alper, who was involved in law, in 1932. She was subject to much gender discrimination throughout her career, especially during her time at Harvard. She was subjected to a grueling three hour interview where she was informed of the low female acceptance and survival rate. She would not receive a position at a university that guaranteed a tenure for female faculty until 1952 at her alma mater. Despite this, she was able to make her mark and see the changing times later on as more women were accepted onto faculty positions. She would retire from her position as a faculty member at her alma mater in 1973 and from Judge Baker in 1979 but continued to run a small practice to help out adult patients until her death.

Thelma Alper died on July 30, 1988 at Sherrill House in Boston due to a stroke. She was 80 years old.

== Education ==
As Alper's record in school was excellent, she was informed by her principal she would not have to take the College Entrance Examination, and was eligible to be admitted into Radcliffe College as a student right away. Despite this, Alper struggled with her choice of college. While Alper favored Radcliffe, her sister and father wanted Wellesley, while her mother picked out Simmons College. Although nervous at the lack of familiar social connections at Wellesley, Alper went with her sister's choice and took the College Boards in June 1925, before officially starting college in September of the same year, at the age of seventeen.

Alper did not take well to Wellesley at first and was even thinking of pulling out. She initially considered a profession as a kindergarten teacher, for which Wellesley did not possess a promising program offering a chance for growth for at the time. However, she chose to stay for the full year at her sister's request, and ended up feeling better about the choice later on as she took more German classes that piqued her interest - leading her to major in the language. Her sophomore year was when she was introduced to the topic of psychology through a required introductory course. She initially disliked the subject and found it quite dry, even when taking more advanced classes in the field. Despite this, she accepted a role as the introductory psychology professor's assistant in May 1929. This allowed her to take care of her sister's young son (since her sister had died in December 1928), and to continue her education at Wellesley for free, even as a graduate student. She chose this position over several jobs that were related to her German major, including a teaching position at Wheaton College, a translator position for a publishing firm, and a position in one of Yale's foreign departments.

She was later promoted to be an assistant for the department, allowing her the experience of teaching small discussions and participating in some research. She received her B.A. in 1929, with General Honors. A brief six-week stint between her junior and senior year of college for Judge Baker Guidance Center allowed her to work in a more clinical position. She later received her M.A. in 1933. Unfortunately, her professor died that summer, which meant that she no longer had good support within the psychology department to advance any further without a Ph.D. It was around this time she hit a wall in her career, being both financially unsure and unable to move forward with her work at Wellesley. She chose to take classes at the Harvard Graduate School of Education a few years later in order to be eligible to help in the English department, where she took on the role of a "director of remedial reading." However, Alper wanted a new challenge and was thus driven to apply for a spot in a Ph.D. program in Harvard's College of Liberal Arts psychology department. This happened despite the current chairman, Dr. Edwin G. Boring, warning her that their acceptance of females was sparse and the environment for them harsh. She was accepted and began class in 1939.

== Career ==
Her first publication came during her time with the remedial reading program, which appeared in The Wellesley Magazine and was titled "If Only I Could Read Faster." She would later become a co-editor for her collaboration with Dr. Boring for two books, "Psychology for the Fighting Man" and "Psychology for the Returning Veteran".

Despite the harsher treatment of women at Harvard at the time and the smaller graduating class compared to men, Alper passed the Qualifying Preliminary Examinations in 1941 and got her Psychology Ph.D. in 1943. After resigning from Wellesley, she became a Psychology tutor at Radcliffe in 1942, and soon a Psychology instructor for Harvard in 1943. The position at Harvard would lead to many hardships on Alper's part, as much of Harvard's curriculum was based around separating male and female. Despite much initial opposition from the male faculty, it was found that the male students were much more accepting of the idea of a female instructor, and enrollment stayed the same. She would be the only female in the department until 1946, with the arrival of Eugenia Hanfmann in the social relations department.

The gender discrimination would continue as both wom en would eventually leave due to the lack of tenure opportunity from Harvard. Alper would find similar results at Tufts and Boston, where both offered spots without the possibility of tenure. She would later accept a position for Clark University's psychology department, where she was, again, the only female on staff. Despite a more accepting and open-minded environment there, she left to take an offer back at Wellesley in 1952 due to her husband's poor health. The position included a role as an associate professor, where she could be promoted into a full professor within two years and tenure was finally an option. Furthermore, the Nursery School at Wellesley would remain as long as it was useful to her research. She would remain there until she retired in 1973. She was also the chairwomen of the psychology department there for some unknown time.

In 1959, Alper would return to the place where she was first given clinical experience - Judge Baker Guidance Center. Her visit was agreed upon with the president of Wellesley, in coordination with her acceptance of her position at the university. At Judge Baker, she would spend her time in clinical research and training in therapy. At some point, she was a consultant for a Head Start set-up in Charlestown, MA, with Dr. Bessie Sperry, which lasted for five-years. She would retire from Judge Baker in June 1979.

=== Research ===
Alper's research mainly focused on completed and uncompleted tasks, meshing clinical and social psychology, the latter of which was influenced by Professor Kurt Lewin's class. This interest was further pursued via her Ph.D., and later led to her creation of a role-orientation measure, termed the Wellesley Role-Orientation Scale (WROS) in 1974. Women who receive a high score using this measure typically prefer the role that are assigned to them via the culture - the traditionalists. Those who don't receive a high score are more likely to either be neutral when it comes to taking on more traditional male careers, or feel that the world is unjust due to the heavy discrimination on women who desire to make a career in male-oriented fields.

== Legacy, awards, and achievements ==
During her time taking courses at the Harvard Graduate School of Education, she developed The Wellesley Spelling Scale with another colleague, which was later published and marketed by the California Test Bureau. After passing her examinations at the Harvard College of Liberal Arts, she became the eleventh woman to gain a Ph.D. from Harvard in psychology. She was also the first Jewish woman to receive such a distinction from Harvard. She served as President of the Massachusetts Psychological Association and two chapters of Phi Beta Kappa. Furthermore, Alper created a measure to study achievement motivation in women, named the Wellesley Role Orientation Scale (WROS). She received a Career Contribution Award in 1975 from the MPA.
