= Julian Hochberg =

American psychologist (1923–2022)

Julian Edward Hochberg (July 10, 1923 – May 22, 2022) was an American psychology researcher and the Centennial Professor Emeritus of Psychology at Columbia University. Much of Hochberg's research involved visual perception. Before coming to Columbia, Hochberg taught at Cornell University and New York University. He was a member of the National Academy of Sciences.

== Biography ==
Hochberg was born in Brooklyn on July 10, 1923 to Edward Hochberg and Dora Wiener Hochberg. He attended Stuyvesant High School, then City College of New York, graduating in 1945 with an undergraduate degree in physics. At City College, Hochberg was influenced by studying perception with psychologist Gardner Murphy. He received a Ph.D. in psychology from the University of California, Berkeley. At Berkeley, he was taught by influential figures like Edward Tolman, Egon Brunswik, and Gordon Lynn Walls.

After graduate school, Hochberg became an instructor at Cornell University and was promoted to full professor by 1960. He was a professor at New York University between 1965 and 1969 before moving to Columbia University, where he finished his teaching career.

== Research ==
According to The Federation of Associations in Behavioral and Brain Sciences:

Hochberg was a leading experimentalist and theoretician in visual perception for half a century. Among his many contributions, he pioneered work on how we integrate the snapshot-views of the world with individual visual fixations into fully-formed percepts of the world “in the mind’s eye.” He led research and thinking on the Gestalt problem and how our percepts are structured to maximize both the likelihood of their being accurate and their simplicity. Beyond his explorations of form and motion perception, Hochberg extended his reach into the perception of pictures, film, and dance.

In the 1950s, Hochberg led a study that examined how college students judged qualities like cuteness and intelligence based on physical features. The study, which was funded by the National Science Foundation and the Office of Naval Research, found that college students studied in the same year showed consistency in judging facial expressions, but students from a given year tended not to agree with students studied in other years. This suggested that over time there are trends in judging people. Hochberg found that there was an exception to the discrepancies seen in students from different years: judgments of the cuteness of babies tended to remain stable over time.

== Personal life ==
Hochberg married and he and his wife had three children. He built the family house in upstate New York. He died on May 22, 2022, at the age of 98.

== Honors and awards ==
Hochberg received the APA Award for Distinguished Scientific Contributions to Psychology from the American Psychological Association. He was elected to the National Academy of Sciences in 1980. In 2000, he received the Howard Crosby Warren Medal from the Society of Experimental Psychologists.
