= Terrie E. Moffitt =

American psychologist

Terrie E. Moffitt MBE FBA
- Born: March 9, 1955 (age 71); Nuremberg, West Germany
- Citizenship: American, British
- Education: University of North Carolina, University of Southern California, University of California, Los Angeles, University of Wisconsin–Madison
- Known for: Developmental theory of crime, Gene-environment interaction
- Spouse: Avshalom Caspi
- Awards: Stockholm Prize in Criminology, Klaus J. Jacobs Research Prize
- Scientific career
- Fields: Psychology
- Workplaces: Duke University, King's College London
- Thesis: Genetic Influence of Parental Psychiatric Illness on Violent and Recidivistic Criminal Behavior (1984)
- Doctoral advisor: Sarnoff A. Mednick
- Website: moffittcaspi.com

Terrie Edith Moffitt MBE FBA (born March 9, 1955) is an American-British clinical psychologist who is best known for her pioneering research on the development of antisocial behavior and for her collaboration with colleague and partner Avshalom Caspi in research on gene-environment interactions in mental disorders.

Moffitt is the Nannerl O. Keohane University Professor of Psychology & Neuroscience at Duke University (USA) and Professor of Social behavior and Development in the Medical Research Council's Social, Genetic and Developmental Psychiatry Center at the Institute of Psychiatry Psychology an Neuroscience King's College London (UK). She is associate director of the Dunedin Longitudinal Study, which follows 1037 people born in 1972–73 in Dunedin, New Zealand. She also launched the Environmental-Risk Longitudinal Twin Study, which follows 1100 British families with twins born in 1994–1995.

== Early life and education ==
Moffitt grew up in North Carolina, United States, and attended the University of North Carolina at Chapel Hill for her undergraduate degree (BA, Psychology 1977). She continued her training in clinical psychology at the University of Southern California (MA, Experimental Animal Behavior 1981; PhD, Clinical Psychology 1984) and completed postdoctoral training at University of California, Los Angeles Neuropsychiatric Institute. In 1985, Moffitt became an assistant professor at the University of Wisconsin–Madison, where she was promoted to full professor in 1995. Moffitt has subsequently served on the faculty at the Institute of Psychiatry, King's College London, and Duke University.

== Life and work ==
Terrie Moffitt studies how genetic and environmental risks work together to shape the course of abnormal human behaviors and psychiatric disorders. Her particular interest is in antisocial and criminal behavior, but she also studies depression, psychosis, addiction, and cognitive aging. She is a licensed clinical psychologist, who completed her clinical hospital training at the UCLA Neuropsychiatric Institute (1984). Her work on the Dunedin Multidisciplinary Health and Development Study in New Zealand has identified patterns of intimate as well as stranger crime, including discoveries about the role of females as initiators of violence. Professor Moffitt is also carrying out an important large-scale follow-up of twins in the UK to investigate biological, psychological, and social influences on development. Her work since 2010 is leading the Dunedin Study into the study of aging.

=== Adolescence-limited and life-course persistent antisocial behavior ===
Moffitt is best known for her theory of adolescence-limited and life-course-persistent offender antisocial behavior. Moffitt's theory holds that there are two main types of antisocial offenders in society. Adolescence-limited offenders exhibit antisocial behavior only during adolescence. Life-course-persistent offenders begin to behave antisocially early in childhood and continue this behavior into adulthood. For her studies of crime and human development she was awarded the Stockholm Prize in Criminology.

=== Gene-environment interaction (GxE) ===
Moffitt is also known for her research on gene-environment interaction (GxE). Her two publications in the journal Science in 2002 and 2003 with her colleague and partner Avshalom Caspi were among the first reports of GxE in humans. The first paper showed that children who carried a polymorphism in the MAOA gene were more vulnerable to developing antisocial behavior following exposure to maltreatment during childhood. The second paper showed that individuals who carried a polymorphism in the serotonin transporter gene (SLC6A4) were more vulnerable to developing depression following exposure to stressful life events. Moffitt and her colleagues have authored a number of articles on theory and methods in GxE research in the fields of psychiatry, psychology, and neuroscience. Moffitt's research on GxE in the development of antisocial behavior has stimulated a global discussion of the idea of criminal intent and responsibility, as well as raising profound questions about humane strategies for crime prevention among abused children at risk of future violence. The second Science paper, on the interaction of SLC6A4 and life stress has generated enormous controversy, culminating in meta-analyses published in leading journals in psychiatry and medicine. Some meta-analyses do not support the original finding, some do, and animal and imaging work on the hypothesis should also be considered. However, the general approach of studying candidate genes, which was the only approach available when Moffitt and Caspi's GxE work was done, has since 2010 been superseded by whole-genome approaches.

== National and International Service Committees ==
- National Advisory Council on Aging, 2016–2019.
- Klaus J Jacobs Foundation Prize Jury Chair, 2015–2020.
- Board on Behavioral Social and Sensory Science, National Academy of Sciences, 2019–2022.
- Nuffield Foundation, Board of Trustees, 2010-2020
- American Society of Criminology, Fellows Committee, 2010
- The Health and Retirement Study, Data Monitoring Board, 2009-2020
- Stockholm Criminology Prize Jury, 2007-2012
- National Academy of Sciences, Panel on Understanding and Controlling the Demand for Illegal Drugs, 2007-2010
- National Academy of Sciences, Advisory Committee on Law and Justice, 2005-2011
- Academia Europaea, Behavioural Sciences section committee, 2008-2010
- American Psychiatric Association WHO-NIMH committee to review research on DSM-V externalizing disorders, 2004-2007
- Faculty 1000 of Medicine, 2005-2007
- UK Department of Trade and Industry, Office of Science and Innovation, Foresight Project on Mental Capital, 2006
- Institute Fellow, University of Cambridge Institute of Criminology, 2004-2007
- National Academy of Sciences, Committee on Improving Research Data on Firearms, 2001-2004
- Medical Research Council Advisory Board member, 2001–2003, College of Experts, 2005-2009
- APA Working Group on Genetics Research, 2002-2003
- Nuffield Council on Bioethics Working Party on Ethics of Research in Genes and Behaviour, UK, 2000-2003
- Jacobs Foundation Young Investigator Awards Committee, Switzerland, 1998 - 2001
- National Science Foundation National Consortium on Violence Research (NCOVR) Steering Committee, 1995–1998, 2002-2003

== Honors and awards ==
Moffitt was awarded the Society of Clinical Child and Adolescent Psychology Distinguished Career Award in 2006. Moffitt and Caspi jointly received the Klaus J. Jacobs Research Prize in 2010 for their innovative research on "the interplay between genetic disposition and environmental influences in the development of children." Moffitt and Caspi were awarded the APA Award for Distinguished Scientific Contributions in 2016; the citation for their shared award emphasizes their research contributions demonstrating "how early life experiences shape health disparities and how genetic factors shape and are shaped by environmental factors."

In 2018, Moffitt was elected to the National Academy of Medicine. Created in 1863, this honorable academy rewards leaders of exceptional quality in health and medicine, such as Terrie Moffitt.

She received an honorary degree from the University of Basel in 2014.

In November 2022 Moffitt, was awarded the Royal Society Te Apārangi's Rutherford Medal, along with the Dunedin Study, team leader Richie Poulton and team members Murray Thomson and Avshalom Caspi.

Moffitt was appointed Member of the Order of the British Empire (MBE) in the 2023 Birthday Honours for services to social science.

== Bibliometrics ==
Moffitt is the most cited author of in several psychology journals such as Journal of Abnormal Psychology, Developmental Psychology, Psychological Review, Development and Psychopathology, and Criminology.

- Times cited = 73,721, Mean citations per item = 190, Peak citation year 2018 = >7,500
- H-index = 131 web of science, 180 google scholar, 25 March 2019

== Selected publications ==
1. Moffitt TE. Adolescence-limited and life-course-persistent antisocial behavior: a developmental taxonomy. Psychol Rev. Oct 1993;100(4):674-701.
2. Moffitt TE. The neuropsychology of conduct disorder. Dev Psychopathol. Win-Spr 1993;5(1–2):135-151.
3. Moffitt TE, Caspi A, Dickson N, Silva P, Stanton W. Childhood-onset versus adolescent-onset antisocial conduct problems in males: Natural history from ages 3 to 18 years. Dev Psychopathol. Spr 1996;8(2):399-424.
4. Caspi A, McClay J, Moffitt TE, et al. Role of genotype in the cycle of violence in maltreated children. Science. Aug 2002;297(5582):851-854.
5. Caspi A, Sugden K, Moffitt TE, et al. Influence of life stress on depression: Moderation by a polymorphism in the 5-HTT gene. Science. Jul 2003;301(5631):386-389.
6. Moffitt TE. The new look of behavioral genetics in developmental psychopathology: Gene-environment interplay in antisocial behaviors. Psychol Bull. Jul 2005;131(4):533-554.
7. Caspi A, Moffitt TE, Cannon M, et al. Moderation of the effect of adolescent-onset cannabis use on adult psychosis by a functional polymorphism in the catechol-O-methyltransferase gene: Longitudinal evidence of a gene X environment interaction. Biol Psychiatry. May 2005;57(10):1117-1127.
8. Moffitt TE, Caspi A, Rutter M. Strategy for investigating interactions between measured genes and measured environments. Arch Gen Psychiatry. May 2005;62(5):473-481.
9. Caspi A, Moffitt TE. Gene-environment interactions in psychiatry: joining forces with neuroscience. Nat Rev Neurosci. Jul 2006;7(7):583-590.
10. Caspi A, Williams B, Kim-Cohen J, et al. Moderation of breastfeeding effects on the IQ by genetic variation in fatty acid metabolism. Proc Natl Acad Sci U S A. Nov 20 2007;104(47):18860-18865.
11. Polanczyk G, Caspi A, Williams B, et al. Protective Effect of CRHR1 Gene Variants on the Development of Adult Depression Following Childhood Maltreatment Replication and Extension. Arch Gen Psychiatry. Sep 2009;66(9):978-985.
12. Caspi A, Hariri AR, Holmes A, Uher R, Moffitt TE. Genetic Sensitivity to the Environment: The Case of the Serotonin Transporter Gene and Its Implications for Studying Complex Diseases and Traits. Am J Psychiatry. May 2010;167(5):509-527.
13. Moffitt TE, Arseneault L, Belsky D, et al. A gradient of childhood self-control predicts health, wealth, and public safety. Proc Natl Acad Sci U S A. Feb 15 2011;108(7):2693-2698.
