= Ian H. Gotlib =

American psychologist

Ian H. Gotlib is an American psychologist. He received his Ph.D. of Clinical Psychology at University of Waterloo in 1981. Now he is a professor of psychology at Stanford University and the director of the Stanford Neurodevelopment, Affect, and Psychopathology Laboratory. His research mainly focuses on affective disorders and depression. He was awarded the APA Award for Distinguished Scientific Contributions to Psychology in 2013.
