= Paul Thomas Young =

American psychologist (1892–1978)

Paul Thomas Young (1892–1978) was an American experimental psychologist and inventor.

Young originally studied at Occidental College and Princeton, and subsequently at Cornell, where his doctoral adviser was Edward Titchener. For most of his career, he was a faculty member at the University of Illinois. In 1928, he constructed the pseudophone, an acoustic device that induced a form of auditory illusion by distorting the direction from which an audible sound appeared to originate.

Young's primary area of research interest was motivation and emotion, in both humans and animals. He received the Distinguished Scientific Contribution Award from the American Psychological Association in 1965.

== Key publications ==
- Emotion in man and animal: Its nature and relation to attitude and motive. Oxford, England: Wiley, 1943.
- The role of affective processes in learning and motivation. Psychological Review 66 (2), 1959, S. 104–125.
- Motivation and emotion: a survey of the determinants of human and animal activity. Oxford, England: Wiley, 1961.
