= Richie Poulton =

New Zealand psychologist (1962–2023)

Richie Poulton CNZM FRSNZ
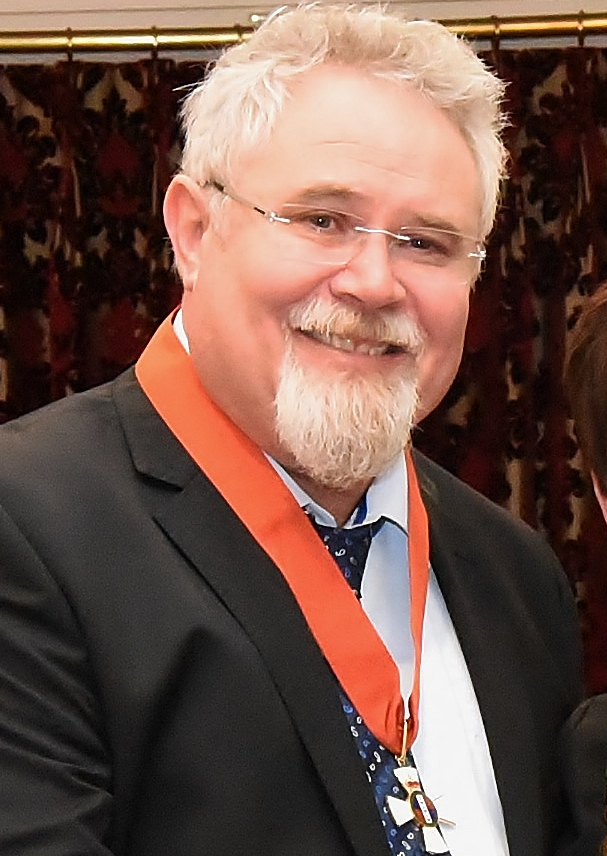
- Poulton in 2017
- Born: Richie Graham Poulton; 1962; Christchurch, New Zealand
- Died: 29 September 2023 (aged 61); New Zealand
- Education: University of Otago; University of New South Wales; Auckland Grammar School
- Known for: Dunedin Multidisciplinary Health and Development Study
- Spouse: Sandhya Ramrakha
- Children: Priyanka Poulton
- Awards: Liley Medal (2004)
- Scientific career
- Fields: Clinical psychology
- Institutions: University of Otago
- Thesis: Appraisal of danger in agoraphobics and social phobics (1995)

Richie Graham Poulton CNZM FRSNZ (1962 – 29 September 2023) was a New Zealand psychologist and the director of the University of Otago's Dunedin Multidisciplinary Health & Development Research Unit, which runs the Dunedin Multidisciplinary Health and Development Study (also known as the Dunedin Study). He was also a professor of psychology at the University of Otago, the 2007 founder and co-director of the National Centre for Lifecourse Research, the founder in 2011 of the Graduate Longitudinal Study, New Zealand, and the chief science adviser of the Ministry of Social Development in the New Zealand government.

== Early life ==
Richie Graham Poulton was born in Christchurch in 1962. His father was a financier, his mother was a "stay-at-home mum". He was one of two sons. For Poulton's father's work, the family moved from Christchurch to Wellington, and then to Auckland. Poulton's last four years of school were at Auckland Grammar School. Although he enjoyed the academic parts of his schooling, he enjoyed sport more, playing cricket in the summer and rugby union in the winter. He was a member of the school's senior rugby team the coach of which was Graham Henry, who eventually coached the New Zealand national rugby union team, the All Blacks.

== University education and career ==
On finishing high school, Poulton moved to Dunedin to attend the University of Otago. There he received his master's degree in science and his postgraduate diploma in clinical psychology. During his diploma studies, Poulton worked as an interviewer for the Dunedin Study, helping Terrie Moffitt assess 13-year-old study participants.

After completing his degrees in 1988, Poulton went to England. He lived in South London—an impoverished area—and worked as a clinical psychologist. Burned out and broke after 18 months, he then went to Sydney, Australia, by which time his parents had moved there. He worked for a year as a clinical psychologist and then enrolled for a Ph.D. at the University of New South Wales. Four years later, in 1995, he received his PhD.

Poulton then took a position as a clinical psychologist at Long Bay Jail, treating people at risk of suicide. There he met his future wife, also a clinical psychologist working in another part of the jail. After six months, he and his by-then wife moved to Dunedin for Poulton to become deputy director of the Dunedin Study.

In 2000, Poulton became director of the Dunedin Study. In 2006, he was appointed to a personal chair in the School of Medicine.

== Personal life and death ==
Poulton was married to clinical psychologist Sandhya Ramrakha, with whom he has a daughter.

In about February 2021, Poulton was diagnosed with salivary duct cancer. Despite treatment, in about May 2021, it had metastasised and was incurable. He died from the disease on 29 September 2023, at the age of 61.

== Awards ==
In 2004, Poulton received the New Zealand Association of Scientists' Research Medal and the Health Research Council of New Zealand's Liley Medal for Excellence in Health Research. He was elected a fellow of the Royal Society of New Zealand in 2010, and was named a Companion of the New Zealand Order of Merit, for services to science and health research, in the 2017 Queen's Birthday Honours. He was named an ISI Highly Cited Researcher in 2014, 2015, 2016, and 2017. In 2019, he received the University of Otago's Distinguished Research Medal, while in 2022 he was appointed a distinguished professor at that university. In November 2022 Poulton was awarded the Royal Society Te Apārangi's Rutherford Medal, along with the Dunedin Study and team members Murray Thomson, Terrie Moffitt and Avshalom Caspi. He was awarded the Marsden Medal in 2023 shortly before his death.
