= Beatriz Luna =

Developmental neuroscientist

- Occupations: Professor of Psychiatry, Pediatrics, and Psychology
- Awards: WPIC Emerging Mentor Award (2010) Presidential Early Career Award in Science and Engineering (2005) NIMH Research Career Award (K01) (1999) NARSAD Young Investigator Award (1997)

Academic background
- Education: University of Pittsburgh

Academic work
- Institutions: University of Pittsburgh

Beatriz Luna is a developmental neuroscientist known for conducting neuroimaging research on the development of cognitive control, reward, and reinforcement learning from early childhood to adolescence.

Luna is the Staunton Professor of Psychiatry and Pediatrics, and Professor of Psychology at the University of Pittsburgh. Luna is the founder and director of the Laboratory of Neurocognitive Development at Western Psychiatric Institute & Clinic (WPIC).

== Biography ==
Luna received her BA in Psychology at the American University in 1984, her MA in Clinical Psychology at Duquesne University in 1985, her PhD in Developmental Psychology at the University of Pittsburgh in 1996. Her dissertation was titled "Visual acuity, visual fields and visual attention in infants and children with periventricular leukomalacia." As a graduate student, her mentors included Velma Dobson and John Sweeney.

Luna received postdoctoral training in Neurobehavioral Studies at the Western Psychiatric Institute & Clinic in 1995-1997. She has been on the faculty of the Department of Psychiatry at the University of Pittsburgh School of Medicine since 1997.

Luna has served as Editor in Chief of the journal Developmental Cognitive Neuroscience and on the National Academy of Sciences U.S. National Committee for Psychological Sciences. She is Co-founder and President of the Flux Society for Developmental Cognitive Neuroscience.

Luna's research focuses on understanding the neural basis of behavior during the adolescence, a time associated with risky behavior and the emergence of many psychiatric disorder including schizophrenia and mood disorders. Her lab uses neuroimaging methods to investigate neurocognitive correlates of cognitive control, reward, and reinforcement learning and their development from childhood to adolescence. Luna's primary focus is on normative development, but she also studies risk factors associated with substance use and psychosis.

== Honors and recognition ==
Luna has received a number of grants including the NARSAD Young Investigator Award (1997), NIMH Research Career Award (K01) (1999), the Presidential Early Career Award for Scientists and Engineers (2005), and the WPIC Emerging Mentor Award (2010). She was elected a Member of the National Academy of Medicine in 2024.

== Representative Publications ==
- Luna, B., Garver, K. E., Urban, T. A., Lazar, N. A., & Sweeney, J. A. (2004). Maturation of cognitive processes from late childhood to adulthood. Child Development, 75(5), 1357–1372. doi:10.1111/j.1467-8624.2004.00745.x
- Luna, B., Minshew, N. J., Garver, K. E., Lazar, N. A., Thulborn, K. R., Eddy, W. F., & Sweeney, J. A. (2002). Neocortical system abnormalities in autism: an fMRI study of spatial working memory. Neurology, 59(6), 834-840.
- Luna, B., Padmanabhan, A., & O’Hearn, K. (2010). What has fMRI told us about the development of cognitive control through adolescence? Brain and cognition, 72(1), 101-113.
- Luna, B., & Sweeney, J. A. (2004). The emergence of collaborative brain function: fMRI studies of the development of response inhibition. In R. E. Dahl & L. P. Spear (Eds.), Annals of the New York Academy of Sciences: Vol. 1021. Adolescent brain development: Vulnerabilities and opportunities (p. 296–309). New York Academy of Sciences.
- Luna, B., Thulborn, K. R., Munoz, D. P., Merriam, E. P., Garver, K. E., Minshew, N. J., ... & Sweeney, J. A. (2001). Maturation of widely distributed brain function subserves cognitive development. Neuroimage, 13(5), 786-793.
