= Harry Helson =

American psychologist (1898–1977)

- Born: November 9, 1898; Chelsea, Massachusetts
- Died: October 13, 1977 (aged 78); Berkeley, California
- Spouse: Lida Anderson

Harry Helson (November 9, 1898 - October 13, 1977) was an American psychologist and professor of psychology who is best known for his adaptation-level theory. Most of his work and research focused on perception, with much of it involving the perception of color. His first published work was his doctoral dissertation on Gestalt psychology, which was published in the American Journal of Psychology in 1925 and 1926. Every year at Kansas State University, a graduate student receives the Harry Helson Award recognition of excellence in scholarship and research in cognitive psychology.

== Early life and education ==
Helson was born in Chelsea, Massachusetts to Jewish immigrants from Eastern Europe. Helson's parents separated, and he lived with his mother from birth until the age of ten in Chelsea, and then New Bedford, Massachusetts. Because of her ill health, Helson went to live with his father for a year, after which he left to live with his mother's friends until he was an adult.

Helson struggled with disciplinary issues in school; with the help of a teacher, he began serious studying in ninth grade and took part in extra-curricular activities. Helson attended Bowdoin College, a private, liberal arts school in Brunswick, Maine where he studied philosophy and psychology. Helson worked as a reporter for the college's newspaper and played the violin to fund his schooling. After earning an undergraduate degree at Bowdoin College, Helson attended Harvard University, planning a doctorate in philosophy, but changed his concentration to psychology by his second year after being introduced to Gestalt psychology. Helson wrote his dissertation on a critical review of Gestalt psychology, and received his Ph.D. in 1924.

== Career ==
Helson's doctoral dissertation from his time at Harvard University was published in the American Journal of Psychology in 1925 and 1926 and served as an introduction of Gestalt psychology in America, because most of the original research on Gestalt psychology was in German.

Helson joined the staff of Kansas State University. There he developed his adaptive-level theory of cognition.

Helson also developed the principle of color conversion after working on photography in a darkroom. Although the lighting in the darkroom was red, Helson noticed that the end of his cigarette was green in color. This set off his interest in color conversion and resulted in ten years of experimentation that he would do on the topic.

Helson died on October 13, 1977, in Berkeley, California.

== The Adaptation-Level Theory ==
Helson developed the adaptation-level theory of psychology. This theory states that an individual's basis of judgment of a stimulus is based on their prior experiences as well as their recollections of how they perceived similar stimuli in the past. It is a theory used to interpret psychological findings, and it is still used today.

Helson asserted that adaptation levels vary from person to person and in different situations. The adaptation-level theory can be applied to attitudes, sounds, light, and many other concepts, although it began with Helson's experiments involving vision. Helson noticed that stimuli sometimes appeared to be without color when they were in monochromatic lighting, and the way the stimuli was viewed depended on the background. This finding led him to his recognition of how adaptation levels work in vision.

== The Harry Helson Award ==
The Harry Helson Award is given out every year to a graduate student at Kansas State University, where Helson was a professor from 1961 to 1968. The award is given to honor and remember Helson's contributions while at Kansas State University. The award was created by one of Helson's graduate students at the university, Dr. Lloyd Avant. Helson's son, Henry Helson, a retired professor from the University of California Berkeley, is a supporter of this award. The award is presented to a graduate student based on excellence in scholarship and research. Past recipients:

- J. Shawn Farris (2003)
- Brian Friel (2003)
- Kimberly Raddatz (2000)
- Rickey Thomas (1999)
- Douglas Peterson (1998)
