= Janice Kiecolt-Glaser =

American psychiatrist

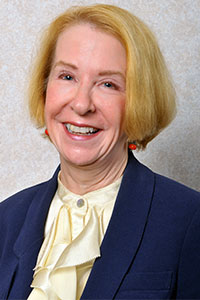
- 2018 photo
- Scientific career
- Fields: Psychiatry
- Workplaces: Ohio State Institute for Behavioral Medicine Research
- Website: Department of Psychology

Janice Kiecolt-Glaser is S. Robert Davis Chair of Medicine and Distinguished University Professor at the Ohio State University College of Medicine. She is a clinical health psychologist specializing in psychoneuroimmunology and Director of the Ohio State Institute for Behavioral Medicine Research. Her research on stress associated with caregiving and marital relationships has been featured in The New York Times, The Wall Street Journal, and many other news outlets.

Kiecolt-Glaser was a 2018 recipient of the American Psychological Association (APA) Award for Distinguished Scientific Contributions. Her award citation acknowledged her "outstanding contributions to our understanding of the roles of psychological and social factors in endocrine, immune, and metabolic responses." Other notable awards include the Lifetime Achievement Award from the Academy of Behavioral Medicine Research (2018) and membership in the National Academy of Medicine (2001). She is a regular contributor to U.S. News & World Report.

== Biography ==
Kiecolt-Glaser, who has written more than 250 publications (often in collaboration with her late husband, virologist Ronald Glaser), is a clinical psychologist working in the field of psychoneuroimmunology. She completed her undergraduate degree in psychology at the University of Oklahoma. She went on to complete her PhD in psychology at the University of Miami in 1974, under the supervision of Leonard I. Jacobson.

Kiecolt-Glaser has served on eleven journal's editorial boards and she has been recognized for her contributions to Health Psychology twice. She led the study at the Ohio State University Wexner Medical Center that showed both stress and diets high in saturated fat lead to inflammation.

Her work focuses on ways stress and depression influence the immune and endocrine system and includes research on the relationship between physical fitness and inflammation, a reliable predictor of all-cause mortality in older adults. Her research has expanded into the world of depression and stressors like daily conflicts, marital problems and major depressive disorders.

Outside of academia, Kiecolt-Glaser has also written two medical-mystery novels; Detecting Lies (1997) and Unconscious Truths: A Dr. Haley McAlister Mystery (1998).

== Representative Papers ==
- Kiecolt-Glaser, J. K., Dura, J. R., Speicher, C. E., Trask, O. J., & Glaser, R. (1991). Spousal caregivers of dementia victims: longitudinal changes in immunity and health. Psychosomatic Medicine, 53(4), 345–362.
- Kiecolt-Glaser, J. K., Fisher, L. D., Ogrocki, P., Stout, J. C., Speicher, C. E., & Glaser, R. (1987). Marital quality, marital disruption, and immune function. Psychosomatic Medicine, 49(1), 13–34.
- Kiecolt-Glaser, J. K., Marucha, P. T., Mercado, A. M., Malarkey, W. B., & Glaser, R. (1995). Slowing of wound healing by psychological stress. The Lancet, 346(8984), 1194–1196.
- Kiecolt-Glaser, J. K., McGuire, L., Robles, T. F., & Glaser, R. (2002). Emotions, morbidity, and mortality: new perspectives from psychoneuroimmunology. Annual Review of Psychology, 53(1), 83–107.
- Kiecolt-Glaser, J. K., & Newton, T. L. (2001). Marriage and health: his and hers. Psychological Bulletin, 127(4), 472–503.
- Kiecolt-Glaser, J. K., Preacher, K. J., MacCallum, R. C., Atkinson, C., Malarkey, W. B., & Glaser, R. (2003). Chronic stress and age-related increases in the proinflammatory cytokine IL-6. Proceedings of the National Academy of Sciences, 100(15), 9090–9095.
