= John H. Flavell =

American developmental psychologist (1928–2025)

- Born: August 9, 1928; Rockland, Massachusetts, U.S.
- Died: March 13, 2025 (aged 96); Menlo Park, California, U.S.
- Known for: metacognition metamemory

Academic background
- Education: Northeastern University (BA); Clark University (MA, PhD)
- Thesis: Thought, Communication and Social Integration in Schizophrenia (1955)
- Doctoral advisor: Thelma Alper

Academic work
- Institutions: University of Rochester; University of Minnesota; Stanford University
- Doctoral students: Henry Wellman; Angeline Lillard

John Hurley Flavell (August 9, 1928 – March 13, 2025) was an American developmental psychologist specializing in children's cognitive development who served as Anne T. and Robert M. Bass Professor, emeritus, at Stanford University. A foundational researcher of metacognition and metamemory, he was a member of both the National Academy of Sciences and the American Academy of Arts and Sciences.

== Early life ==
Flavell was born to Paul I. and Anne O'Brien Flavell in Rockland, Massachusetts in 1928. His father, a civil engineer, was unemployed for a time during the Great Depression.

== Education ==
After graduating from high school in 1945, Flavell served in the United States Army until 1947, reaching the rank of private first class. Following that, he enrolled at Northeastern University, where in 1951 he earned his bachelor's degree in psychology. After graduation, he was admitted into the clinical psychology program at Clark and Harvard Universities; he earned his M.A. degree from Clark in 1952, and in 1955 he earned his Ph.D. At Clark, Flavell was mentored by Thelma Alper. His thesis was entitled Thought, Communication and Social Integration in Schizophrenia: An Experimental and Theoretical Study.

== Career ==
From 1955 to 1956, Flavell worked as a clinical psychologist at Fort Lyon V.A. hospital in Colorado. After leaving Fort Lyon, he accepted a position at the University of Rochester, first as a clinical associate and then as an assistant professor of psychology; he was promoted to associate professor in 1960. In 1965, he was invited to become a full professor at the University of Minnesota Institute of Child Development, where he worked as a professor of psychology. He left in 1976 to join Stanford University as a professor. As of 2023, he was a retiree with an emeritus title and held the Anne T. and Robert M. Bass Professorship (Note: See Robert Bass for endowment donor.) in the School of Humanities and Sciences, emeritus.

Building off the work of Jean Piaget, Flavell published a book on children's cognitive development, The Developmental Psychology of Jean Piaget, in 1963, noted as the "first major work in English on the research and theories of Piaget," which "marked the start of the modern science of cognitive development." Other milestones in his career include serving as the president of the American Psychological Association's Division of Developmental Psychology in 1970, and as a member of the governing council of the Society for Research in Child Development from 1975 to 1983, of which he was president from 1979 to 1981. He was recognized with an Award for Distinguished Scientific Contributions from the American Psychological Society in 1984.

== Research ==
Flavell continued to be known for his research into metacognition and the child's theory of mind; he is credited with coining the term metacognition, and as the founder of metacognition theory. He also published widely on children's developing understanding of the distinction between appearance and reality. (Note: See, for example: Flavell, John H. (October 1993). "The Development of Children's Understanding of False Belief and the Appearance-Reality Distinction". International Journal of Psychology. 28 (5): 595–604. doi:10.1080/00207599308246944. ISSN 0020-7594.) These studies assessed young children's ability to acknowledge that a given object is really one kind of thing, yet appears to be another kind of thing, or that a given piece of material is really one color, yet appears to be another color under particular circumstances. Flavell and his colleagues found that whereas most three-year-olds fail these tasks, five-year-olds and older four-year-olds succeed on them. Flavell interprets this developmental difference as suggesting that children acquire the notion of mental representation of reality as distinct from reality itself. The appearance–reality paradigm, along with the false-belief task, is widely used as diagnostic of theory of mind development during early childhood. Flavell's other work has addressed children's developing understanding of perception, perspective-taking, and their introspective insight into their own subjective experiences.

== Death ==
Flavell died in Menlo Park, California, on March 13, 2025, at the age of 96. On March 25, fellow Stanford professor Brian Knutson stated in a LinkedIn post that Flavell had died and offered his condolences. Uta Frith followed suit in a Bluesky post on April 15. The Stanford School of Humanities and Sciences announced his death on June 23, and his obituary was included in the Winter 2026 issue of Stanford Magazine.
