= Wendell Garner =

American psychologist (1921–2008)

Wendell R. Garner
- Born: January 21, 1921; Buffalo, New York
- Died: August 14, 2008 (aged 87); Redding, Connecticut
- Education: Franklin & Marshall College; Harvard University
- Occupation: Psychologist
- Employers: Yale University; Johns Hopkins University
- Known for: Psychology research
- Spouse: Barbara Garner née Ward
- Children: 2

Wendell R. Garner (January 21, 1921 – August 14, 2008) was a Yale University psychology researcher credited with making significant contributions to the cognitive revolution, in which George Miller and others applied emerging research from the fields of artificial intelligence and computer science to test ideas about human mental processes.

== Background ==
Garner was born January 21, 1921, in Buffalo, New York. He attended Franklin & Marshall College in Lancaster, Pennsylvania. After graduating, he went on to Harvard University where he received a master's degree in 1943 and a doctoral degree in 1946. He met his spouse Barbara Ward Garner while working at Harvard's radar laboratory during World War II.

== Career ==
In 1946, Garner moved to Baltimore to join the faculty of Johns Hopkins University and from 1954 to 1964 chaired the school's psychology department, also serving as director the Institute for Cooperative Research that existed at the time.

In 1967, Garner joined Yale's faculty as the James Rowland Angell Professor of Psychology, in time becoming chair of the Department of Psychology. He also was the dean of the Graduate School of Arts and Sciences between 1978 and 1979.

Garner's research helped crystallize concepts like channel capacity as applied to the cognitive revolution. According to the Federation of Associations in Behavioral & Brain Sciences, he was best known for his Uncertainty and Structure as Psychological Concepts, first published in 1962, which extended information theory into the field of psychology; his 1974 book The Processing of Information and Structure, which addressed pattern perception and dimensional interaction; and Applied Experimental Psychology, a textbook he coauthored in 1949.

== Later years ==
In retirement, Garner and his spouse Barbara lived in Redding, Connecticut. He died August 14, 2008.

== Awards ==
Garner won multiple awards during his career, including election to the National Academy of Sciences in 1965; the American Psychological Association's Distinguished Scientific Contribution Award; the American Psychological Foundation's Gold Medal for Science of Psychology; the Warren Medal from the Society of Experimental Psychologists; Yale's Wilbur Cross Medal; and an honorary degree from Johns Hopkins.
