= Judit Gervain =

Psychologist and neurolinguist

Judit Gervain is a psychologist, neurolinguist and acquisitionist who is professor of developmental psychology at the University of Padua.

== Education, career and honours ==
Gervain studied for a triple MA at the University of Szeged, Hungary: in English Language and Literature, French Language and Literature (1996–2002) and Theoretical Linguistics (1998–2003). She received her PhD from the International School for Advanced Studies in Trieste, Italy, in 2007.

From 2007 to 2009 she worked as a postdoctoral researcher at the University of British Columbia. In 2009 she moved to the CNRS to take up a position as researcher, where she was promoted to director of research in 2017. She is currently full professor in the Department of Developmental Psychology and Socialisation at the University of Padua.

In 2018 Gervain received a Consolidator Grant from the European Research Council for her project BabyRhythm. In the same year she was elected Member of the Academia Europaea.

== Research ==
Gervain's research is interdisciplinary, spanning linguistics, psychology and developmental cognitive neuroscience. She has worked on information-theoretic approaches to speech, speech perception, the perceptual and learning abilities of newborns, and early language acquisition. The optical brain-monitoring technique functional near-infrared spectroscopy has been a central method in her work. Her ERC project BabyRhythm (2018–2023) dealt with how speech prosody lays the foundations for language acquisition in infants, both before and after birth.

== Selected publications ==
- Gervain, Judit, Francesco Macagno, Silvia Cogoi, Marcela Peña & Jacques Mehler. 2008. The neonate brain detects speech structure. Proceedings of the National Academy of Sciences 105 (37), 14222–14227. doi:10.1073/pnas.0806530105
- Gervain, Judit, Marina Nespor, Reiko Mazuka, Ryota Horie & Jacques Mehler. 2008. Bootstrapping word order in prelexical infants: A Japanese–Italian cross-linguistic study. Cognitive psychology 57 (1), 56–74. doi:10.1016/j.cogpsych.2007.12.00
- Gervain, Judit & Jacques Mehler. 2010. Speech perception and language acquisition in the first year of life. Annual review of psychology 61, 191–218. doi:10.1146/annurev.psych.093008.100408
- Gervain, Judit, Jacques Mehler, Janet F. Werker, Charles A. Nelson, Gergely Csibra, Sarah Lloyd-Fox, Mohinish Shukla & Richard N. Aslin. 2011. Near-infrared spectroscopy: a report from the McDonnell infant methodology consortium. Developmental cognitive neuroscience 1 (1), 22–46. doi:10.1016/j.dcn.2010.07.004
- Gervain, Judit, & Janet F. Werker. 2013. Prosody cues word order in 7-month-old bilingual infants. Nature Communications 4 (1), 1490. doi:10.1038/ncomms2430
- Yücel, Meryem A., Alexander V. Lühmann, Felix Scholkmann, Judit Gervain, Ippeita Dan, Hasan Ayaz, David Boas, Robert J. Cooper, Joseph Culver, Clare E. Elwell, Adam Eggebrecht, Maria A. Franceschini, Christophe Grova, Fumitaka Homae, Frédéric Lesage, Hellmuth Obrig, Ilias Tachtsidis, Sungho Tak, Yunjie Tong, Alessandro Torricelli, Heidrun Wabnitz & Martin Wolf. 2021. Best practices for fNIRS publications. Neurophotonics 8 (1), 012101. doi:10.1117/1.NPh.8.1.012101
