= Robert S. Siegler =

American psychologist

Robert S. Siegler (born 12 May 1949) is an American psychologist and professor of psychology at Columbia University. He is a recipient of the American Psychological Association's 2005 Distinguished Scientific Contribution Award.

He specializes in the cognitive development of problem solving and reasoning in children. Three areas of particular interest to his research are strategy choices, long-term learning, and educational applications of cognitive-developmental theory. He proposed the 'overlapping waves' model of cognitive development in 1996.

Siegler received a B.A. in psychology from the University of Illinois in 1970 and a Ph.D. in psychology from SUNY Stony Brook in 1974. He was employed at Carnegie Mellon University until 2018, where he was a colleague of Herbert A. Simon. In 2018, he began a faculty position at the Teachers College, Columbia University as the Jacob H Schiff Foundations Professor of Psychology & Education.

Siegler has authored and co-authored several books on cognitive development, including How Children Discover New Strategies, How Children Develop, Children’s Thinking: 4th Edition, and Emerging Minds, which was chosen as one of the Best Psychology Books of 1996 by the Association of American Publishers.

He has also served as associate editor of the journal Developmental Psychology. He was a member of the National Mathematics Advisory Panel.
