= Eugene F. Irschick =

American historian (1934-2022)

- Born: Eugene F. Irschick; 1934; Kodaikanal, Madras Presidency, British India (now in Tamil Nadu, India)
- Died: 10 November 2022 (aged 87–88); El Dorado Hills, California, US
- Occupation: Historian
- Years active: 1964–2015

Eugene F. Irschick was an American historian. He was born in Kodaikanal (Tamil Nadu, India) in 1934, the son of Lutheran missionaries. He was a professor of history at the University of California, Berkeley, since 1978. He died on November 10, 2022 in El Dorado Hills, California

== Biography ==
Irschick, a 1951 graduate of the Kodaikanal School, earned his BA in history with minor in religion and Greek from Gettysburg College in 1955 and his MA in South Asia Regional Studies from the University of Pennsylvania in 1959. He subsequently did his PhD from the University of Chicago in 1964.

== Works ==
- Eugene F. Irschick; University of California, Berkeley. Center for South and Southeast Asia Studies (1969). Politics and Social Conflict in South India: The Non-Brahman Movement and Tamil Separatism, 1916-1929. University of California Press. GGKEY:X5KJTZKJXZU.
- Eugene F. Irschick (1 January 1986). Tamil revivalism in the 1930s. Cre-A. ISBN 9780836419184.
- Eugene F. Irschick (5 April 1994). Dialogue and History: Constructing South India, 1795-1895. University of California Press. ISBN 978-0-520-91432-2.
- Eugene F. Irschick (20 July 2015). A History of the New India: Past and Present. Routledge. ISBN 9780415435796.
