= Edward Arnett =

American chemist and Quaker (1922–2022)

Edward McCollin Arnett (September 25, 1922 – May 11, 2022) was an American chemist.

== Early life ==
Born in Philadelphia, to John Hancock Arnett, a physician, and Katherine Williams McCollin, a singer and composer, Arnett was a Quaker and conscientious objector who served in the Civilian Public Service during World War II. Arnett completed his undergraduate degree at the University of Pennsylvania, and in 1949, earned a Ph.D. from the same institution.

== Academic career ==
He began teaching at the University of Pittsburgh in 1957. In 1968, Arnett was awarded a Guggenheim Fellowship. He joined the faculty of Duke University in 1980 and, three years later, was named a member of the National Academy of Sciences. At Duke, Arnett was appointed the R.J. Reynolds Professor of Chemistry, and retired in 1992.

== Personal life ==
Arnett died on May 11, 2022, at the age of 99.

== Selected bibliography ==
- Arnett, Edward; Kent, Allen (1973). Computer-based chemical information. New York: M. Dekker. ISBN 9780824760458. OCLC 698516.
- A different kind of war story : a conscientious objector in World War II. United States: Xlibris Corp. 2012. ISBN 9781469198026. OCLC 794207019.
