= E. Mavis Hetherington =

Canadian psychologist (1926–2023)

E. Mavis Hetherington (November 27, 1926 – July 21, 2023) was a Canadian psychology professor at the University of Virginia. She was a leading researcher on the impacts of divorce, family as units, and child development. She published more than 200 articles and edited 13 books. Hetherington also introduced a new method of analyzing observational research.

== Early life and education ==
E. Mavis Hetherington was born in British Columbia on November 27, 1926. She earned a B.A. degree in English and psychology in 1947, and a year later earned her M.A. in psychology at the University of British Columbia. After receiving her master's degree, she entered the graduate program at the University of California, Berkeley where she earned her Ph.D. in clinical and developmental psychology in 1958. At Berkeley, Hetherington studied under Leo Postman, who influenced her to become involved in research instead of becoming a practitioner.

== Marriage and career ==
Hetherington met her husband, John Hetherington, while working on her Ph.D. She started her academic career at Rutgers University-Newark. In 1960, Hetherington and her husband obtained positions at the University of Wisconsin-Madison. While teaching in Wisconsin, Hetherington experienced discrimination by being paid less than the men in the department while out-publishing them and being one of the most popular professors. During her career she published more than 200 research articles and edited 13 books. Hetherington's many awards include the Distinguished Teaching in Developmental Psychology Award from the American Psychological Association, the G. Stanley Hall Distinguished Scientist Award from Division 7 (Developmental Psychology) of the American Psychological Association, and the Society for Research on Adolescence Distinguished Scientist Award.

== Major contributions ==
=== Virginia Longitudinal Study of Divorce and Remarriage. ===
In 1972, Hetherington and colleagues started the 20-year Longitudinal Study of Divorce and Remarriage. Hetherington followed 450 families who had children that were four years old and lived in Virginia. Today, some of those children are adults and have also been divorced or remarried. This has allowed Hetherington to study the effects of divorce and remarriage through generations. Numerous follow up studies have also been completed from this data. Findings have caused controversy and a new perspective on divorce, remarriage, and families. Hetherington and colleagues found that divorce is devastating but not as devastating as most theorists have concluded. She also discovered that divorce can't be looked at as a single event but must be viewed as a process of transitions and perspectives from the entire family. Hetherington concluded that social interactions of the family will affect the outcomes of divorce and remarriage and variations of outcomes must be acknowledged.

=== Later life and death ===
Because of her husband's illness, Hetherington retired in 1999 after 29 years at the University of Virginia, but her research continued through the students she mentored.

E. Mavis Hetherington died on July 21, 2023, at the age of 96.
