= Diane Hughes =

Developmental psychologist

- Occupation: Professor of Applied Psychology
- Awards: SRCD Distinguished Contributions to Understanding International, Cultural, and Contextual Diversity in Child Development Award (2021)

Academic background
- Education: Williams College; University of Michigan
- Website: https://www.dianehughesphd.com/

Diane Leslie Hughes is a developmental psychologist known for her research on racial-ethnic socialization, parent-child communication about discrimination and racism, interracial relationships, and the influence of racial ecology on people's experiences in social settings. She is Professor of Applied Psychology at the Steinhardt School of Culture, Education, and Human Development and co-director of the Center for Research on Culture, Development, and Education at New York University.

In 2021, the Society for Research in Child Development presented Hughes with the Distinguished Contributions to Understanding International, Cultural, and Contextual Diversity in Child Development Award, citing her "leadership and pioneering contributions in family, parenting, and racial socialization research, including the influence of context (e.g., peers, schools, communities) on developmental patterns of diverse youth populations."

== Biography ==
Hughes attended Williams College where she achieved a B.A. in Psychology and African-American Studies in 1979. She went on to attend the University of Michigan and completed an M.A. in Community Psychology in 1983 and a Ph.D. in Community and Developmental Psychology in 1988. Her graduate studies were supported by a National Institute of Mental Health Predoctoral Fellowship (1979-1982), a Bush Foundation Training Fellowship in Child Development and Social Policy (1980-1982), a New York City Urban Fellowship (1982-1983), and a Horace H. Rackham Pre-doctoral Fellowship (1984-1986). Her dissertation titled Relationships between characteristics of the job, work/family interference, and marital outcomes, was supervised by Richard Price.

Hughes joined the faculty of New York University in 1988 where she has remained throughout her career. She was a visiting scholar at the Russell Sage Foundation from 1996 to 1997. Her work has been funded by the National Science Foundation, the National Institutes of Health, the William T. Grant Foundation, the John D. And Catherine T. MacArthur Foundation, and the Carnegie Corporation of New York.

== Research ==
Hughes has conducted research on the nature of parents' race-related communications to children and consequences for children's identity development and well-being. She conducts her research through focus groups, surveys and interviews with children and parents, following them from middle school to high school. In one of her studies, Hughes focused on two aspects of racial socialization in structured interviews with Dominican, Puerto Rican, and African-African parents: cultural socialization messages conveying ethnic pride, history, and heritage, and preparation for bias messages about discrimination and racism. She found that there were no significant ethnic group differences in frequencies of cultural socialization messages, which were more common than preparation for bias messages. However, African American parents reported giving preparation for bias messages more often than Dominican parents, and Dominican parents reported giving such messages more often than Puerto Rican parents. Preparation for bias messages appeared to be linked to participants' experiences of discrimination in American society.

== Representative publications ==
- Hughes, Diane (March 2003). "Correlates of African American and Latino Parents' Messages to Children About Ethnicity and Race: A Comparative Study of Racial Socialization". American Journal of Community Psychology. 31 (1–2): 15–33. doi:10.1023/A:1023066418688. PMID 12741687. S2CID 2816575.
- Hughes, Diane; Chen, Lisa (December 1997). "When and What Parents Tell Children About Race: An Examination of Race-Related Socialization Among African American Families". Applied Developmental Science. 1 (4): 200–214. doi:10.1207/s1532480xads0104_4.
- Hughes, Diane; Del Toro, Juan; Harding, Jessica F.; Way, Niobe; Rarick, Jason R. D. (September 2016). "Trajectories of Discrimination Across Adolescence: Associations With Academic, Psychological, and Behavioral Outcomes". Child Development. 87 (5): 1337–1351. doi:10.1111/cdev.12591. PMID 27684390.
- Hughes, Diane; Johnson, Deborah (November 2001). "Correlates in Children's Experiences of Parents' Racial Socialization Behaviors". Journal of Marriage and Family. 63 (4): 981–995. doi:10.1111/j.1741-3737.2001.00981.x.
- Hughes, Diane; Rodriguez, James; Smith, Emilie P.; Johnson, Deborah J.; Stevenson, Howard C.; Spicer, Paul (2006). "Parents' ethnic-racial socialization practices: A review of research and directions for future study". Developmental Psychology. 42 (5): 747–770. doi:10.1037/0012-1649.42.5.747. PMID 16953684.
- Hughes, Diane; Witherspoon, Dawn; Rivas-Drake, Deborah; West-Bey, Nia (April 2009). "Received ethnic–racial socialization messages and youths' academic and behavioral outcomes: Examining the mediating role of ethnic identity and self-esteem". Cultural Diversity and Ethnic Minority Psychology. 15 (2): 112–124. doi:10.1037/a0015509. PMID 19364198.
