= Susan Gelman =

American psychologist (born 1957)

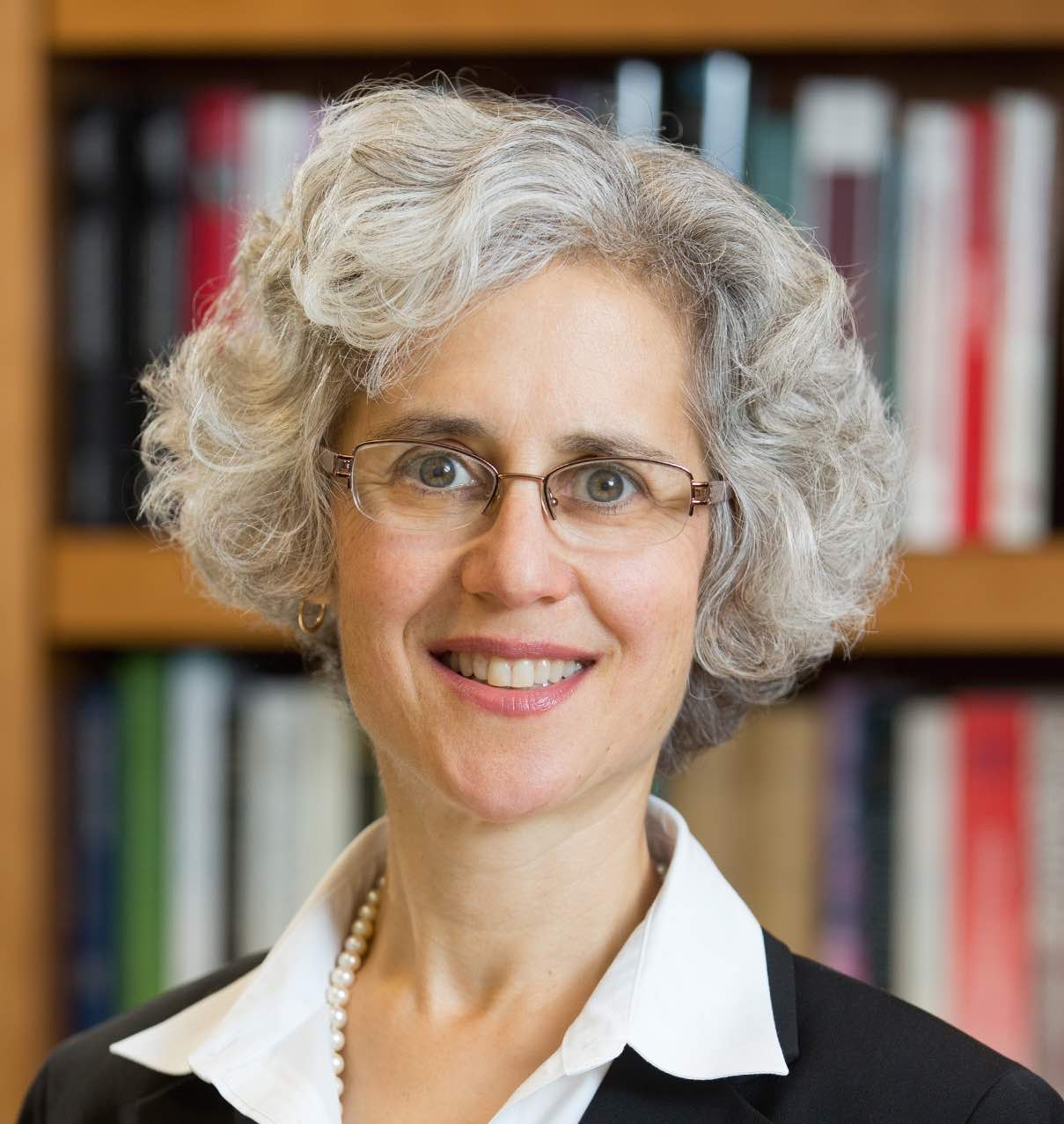
- Gelman in 2016
- Born: July 24, 1957 (age 69)
- Education: Oberlin College (BA); Stanford University (PhD)
- Scientific career
- Fields: Psychology and linguistics
- Workplaces: University of Michigan
- Website: sites.lsa.umich.edu/gelman-lab

External videos
- “Henry Russel Lecture 2021”, University of Michigan, Gelman's lecture begins @17 minutes in.

Susan A. Gelman (born July 24, 1957) is currently Heinz Werner Distinguished University Professor of psychology and linguistics and the director of the Conceptual Development Laboratory at the University of Michigan. Gelman studies language and concept development in young children. Gelman subscribes to the domain specificity view of cognition, which asserts that the mind is composed of specialized modules supervising specific functions in the human and other animals. Her book The Essential Child is an influential work on cognitive development.

Gelman was elected to the American Academy of Arts & Sciences in 2008 and the National Academy of Sciences in 2012. She has served as the president of the Society for Philosophy and Psychology (2018) and the president of the Cognitive Development Society (2005–2007). Gelman was a founding co-editor of the journal the Annual Review of Developmental Psychology.

== Education ==
Gelman received her B.A., Psychology and Classical Greek from Oberlin College in 1980, and her Ph.D. in psychology, with a Ph.D. minor in Linguistics from Stanford University in 1984. Her PhD advisor was Ellen Markman.

== Career ==
Gelman is currently the Heinz Werner Distinguished University Professor of psychology and linguistics and the director of the Conceptual Development Laboratory at the University of Michigan.

She was previously the Frederick G. L. Huetwell professor of psychology at the University of Michigan, Ann Arbor.

== Research ==
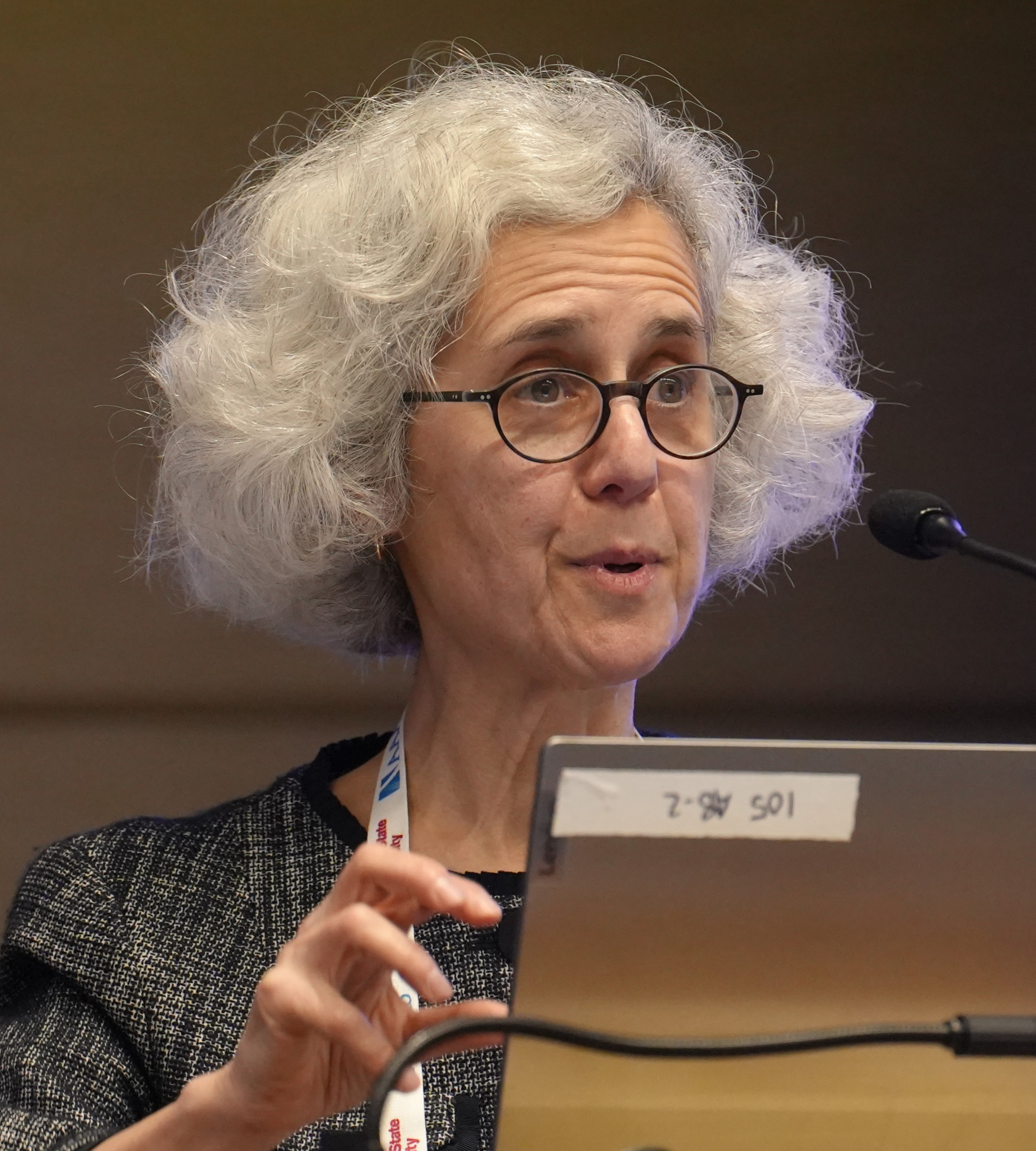
Gelman in 2026

Gelman directs the Conceptual Development Lab in the Psychology Department of the University of Michigan. Most of the studies conducted at the lab focus on children between the ages of 2 and 10, and are carried out in a home-like laboratory setting or in local preschools and middle schools.

Gelman is the author of over 200 publications in psychology research or related articles. Her research focuses on cognitive development, language acquisition, categorization, inductive reasoning, causal reasoning, and the relationship between language and thought.

Her books include:

- Gelman, Susan (2003). The essential child: Origins of essentialism in everyday thought. New York, NY: Oxford University Press. ISBN 9780199345014.
- Banaji, Mahzarin R.; Gelman, Susan A., eds. (2013). Navigating the social world : what infants, children, and other species can teach us. Oxford: Oxford University Press. ISBN 9780199361069.
- Hirschfeld, L. A.; Gelman, S. A., eds. (1994). Mapping the Mind : Domain Specificity in Cognition and Culture. Cambridge: Cambridge University Press. ISBN 9780511752902.

== Essentialism ==
Gelman has been a major contributor to essentialism and relating essentialist ideas to varying aspects in psychology. Gelman's work within the two fields share a familiar subsection: development of children. Her work has established that children, within a given age range, are able to detect underlying essences or root causes for predicting observed behaviors. Gelman's work has yielded insights into how children acquire language. Her book The Essential Child: Origins of Essentialism in Everyday Thought is an influential work on cognitive development and essentialism that has been cited more than 2000 times.

== Research areas and topics of interest ==
- Developmental psychology
- Cognitive development
- Language acquisition
- Categorization and inductive reasoning
- Psychological essentialism
- Social categories; Ownership, Authenticity, and Object history
- Parent-child conversations
- Semantic development
- Causal reasoning
- Relations between language and thought

== Awards ==
- 2022, elected to the American Association for the Advancement of Science.
- 2016, G. Stanly Hall Award for Distinguished Contribution to Developmental Psychology, Division 7, American Psychological Association.
- 2012, elected to the National Academy of Sciences
- 2012, Developmental Psychology Mentor Award, Division 7, American Psychological Association
- 2008, elected to the American Academy of Arts & Sciences
- 2007–2008, James Mckeen Cattell Fund Fellowship, Association for Psychological Science
- 2005, Eleanor Maccoby Book prize from Division 7 at the American Psychological Association for The Essential Child: Origins of Essentialism in Everyday Thought (2003)
- 2005, inaugural Best Authored Book Award, Cognitive Development Society. for The Essential Child (2003)
- 1996, J. S. Guggenheim Fellowship
- 1992, Robert L. Fantz Award, American Psychological Foundation
- 1992, Distinguished Scientific Award, American Psychological Association, for Early career Contribution to Psychology

== Family ==
Her younger brother is the statistician Andrew Gelman of Columbia University. The cartoonist Woody Gelman was her uncle.
