= Dunedin Multidisciplinary Health and Development Study =

Long-running study of 1037 people born over the course of a year in Dunedin, New Zealand

The Dunedin Multidisciplinary Health and Development Study (also known as the Dunedin Study) is a detailed study of human health, development and behaviour. Based at the University of Otago in New Zealand, the Dunedin Study has followed the lives of 1037 babies born between 1 April 1972 and 31 March 1973 at Dunedin's former Queen Mary Maternity Centre since their birth. Teams of national and international collaborators work on the Dunedin Study. The research seeks to answer questions about how people's early years have an impact on mental and physical health as they age.

The study is now in its fifth decade and has produced over 1300 publications and reports, many of which have influenced or helped inform policy makers in New Zealand and overseas.

== History ==
The Dunedin Study was proposed by psychology student Phil Silva, who worked on a neonatology survey involving 250 children with learning and behavioural issues. He found that 10% had significant problems that had previously gone undiagnosed, a topic he researched in his 1978 doctoral thesis. He realised that a larger sample size was needed; this resulted in the Dunedin Study. The original pool of study members was selected from children born at the Queen Mary Maternity Centre in Dunedin who were still living in the wider Otago region three years later. In the early years, the study was underfunded, and the local community helped collect data. The study members include 535 males and 502 females, 1013 singletons and 12 sets of twins. At the age 38 assessment, only one-third of members still resided in Dunedin; most of the remainder lived elsewhere in New Zealand and Australia. Study members were assessed at age three, and then at ages 5, 7, 9, 11, 13, 15, 18, 21, 26, 32, 38, 45 and, most recently, at age 52 (2024–present). Silva directed the study until he retired from the role in 2000. Professor Richie Poulton was the study's director from 2000 to 2023, and was succeeded by Professor Reremoana Theodore. She first worked for the study as an assistant in 1998, and returned in 2010 to work with Poulton.

During an assessment, study members are brought back to Dunedin from around the world to participate in a day of interviews, physical tests, dental checkups, blood sampling, computer questionnaires, and surveys. Sub-studies include the Family Health History Study, which involved the parents of Dunedin Study members to explore family health histories (2003–2006); the Parenting Study, focusing on the Dunedin Study member and their first three-year-old child; and the Next Generation Study, which examined the offspring of Dunedin Study members as they turned 15. This study examined teenagers' lifestyles, behaviors, attitudes, and health, aiming to assess how these have changed since the original study participants were 15 in 1987–88. Ultimately, this provides data across three generations of the same families.

Great emphasis is placed on the retention of study members. In the most recent completed assessment (age 45), 94% of all living eligible study members, or 938 people, participated. Longitudinal studies often have dropout rates exceeding 40%, making the Dunedin Study an outlier in this regard.

The resulting database has produced a wealth of information on many aspects of human health and development. As of 2015, over 1,200 papers, reports, book chapters and other publications have been produced using findings from the study. The multidisciplinary aspect of the study has always been a central focus, with information ranging across:

- Cardiovascular health and risk factors
- Respiratory health
- Oral health
- Sexual and reproductive health
- Mental health
- Psychosocial functioning
- Other health, including sensory, musculoskeletal, and digestive

A book, From Child to Adult: Dunedin Multidisciplinary Health and Development Study, was published in 1996 and aimed to present the major findings in an accessible form to nonspecialists. It includes information up to the age-21 assessment. A 2023 book, The Origins of You: How Childhood Shapes Later Life, covers many of the later findings.

This study was awarded the 2016 Prime Minister's Science Prize. In 2022, it was awarded the Royal Society Te Apārangi's Rutherford Medal.

== Findings ==
The Dunedin Study has found that walking speed is related to small brain differences, that the speed of ageing of one's brain relates to their general speed of ageing, a link between the amount of white matter hyperintensities and a person's rate of cognitive decline, that there are differences in brain structure of people with and without antisocial behaviour in their teenage/young adult years, a link between IQ and brain size; the correspondence of brain structure with poor mental state, cardiovascular fitness, lead exposure, difficult childhoods, childhood self-control, and drug and alcohol use. They have also found that children experiencing social isolation between the ages of 5 and 11 were more likely to have poor cardiovascular health, and increased age-related cognitive decline compared to those who were not socially isolated.

The Dunedin Study has also suggested that poor mental health can cause poor physical health and increased rates of aging.

== See also ==
- Up (film series)
- British birth cohort studies
