= Fabri =

Fabri is a surname. Notable people with the surname include:

- Anna Fabri (f. 1496), Swedish publisher and printer
- Annibale Pio Fabri (1697–1760), Italian singer and composer
- Cornelia Fabri (1869–1915), Italian mathematician
- Emanuel Fabri (born 1952), Maltese footballer
- Ernst Fabri (1891–1966), Austrian writer and journalist
- Felix Fabri (c.1441–1502), Swiss Dominican theologian
- Frances Fabri (1929–2006), Hungarian-born author
- Francesco Saverio Fabri (1761–1817), Italian architect active in Portugal
- Georg Fabri (died 1498), Bishop of Mainz
- Honoré Fabri (1607–1688), French Jesuit theologian
- Johann Ernst Fabri (1755–1825), German geographer and statistician
- Johannes Fabri (f.1434–1451), Bishop of Osnabrück
- Johannes Fabri (died 1458), Bishop of Paderborn
- Julien Fabri (born 1994), French footballer
- Kurt Fabri (1932–1990), Austrian-born Soviet animal behavior scientist
- Martinus Fabri (died 1400), Dutch composer in The Hague
- Ratna Fabri (fl. 1971), Indian museologist
- Rodrigo Fabri (born 1976), Brazilian footballer
- Sisto Fabri (1540–1594), Italian Dominican theologian and canon lawyer
- Stefano Fabri (c.1670–1755), Italian composer
- Thomas Fabri (c.1380–c.1420), Flemish composer in Bruges
- Zoltán Fábri (1917–1994), Hungarian film director and screenwriter
- Roger Fabri, King of Cadence | Sultan of Speed

Fabri can also be a shortened form of the names "Fabricio" or "Fabrizio". Notable people with this nickname include:

- Fabri González (born 1955), Spanish footballer
- Fabri Fibra (born 1976), Italian rapper
- Fabri (born 1987), Spanish footballer
