= Cynophobia =

Fear of dogs and canines

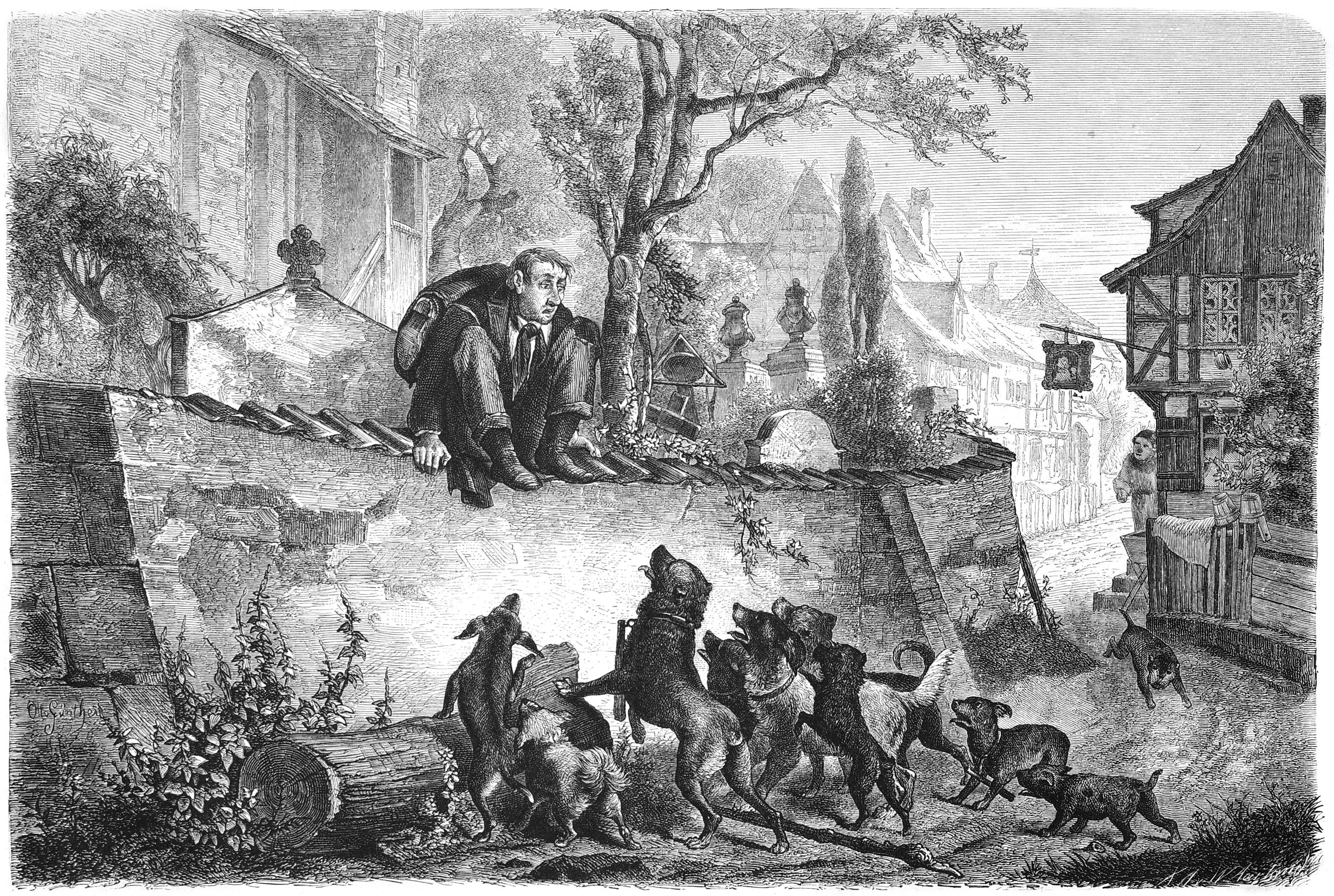
Illustration of a man keeping away from dogs atop a wall

Cynophobia (Note: /ˌsaɪnəˈfoʊbiə/ SY-nə-FOH-bee-ə) (from the Greek: κύων kýōn 'dog' and φόβος phóbos 'fear') is the fear of dogs, wolves and canines in general. Cynophobia is classified as a specific phobia, under the subtype "animal phobias". According to Timothy O. Rentz of the Laboratory for the Study of Anxiety Disorders at the University of Texas, animal phobias are among the most common of the specific phobias and 36% of patients who seek treatment report being afraid of dogs or afraid of cats. Although ophidiophobia or arachnophobia are more common animal phobias, cynophobia is especially debilitating because of the high prevalence of dogs (an estimated 62 million pet dogs in the United States, for example) and because dog owners are generally ignorant about the phobia. Cynophobia is especially problematic for people who live in or visit countries where there are numerous free-ranging dogs; for example it is estimated that there are 62 million free-ranging dogs in India. The Diagnostic and Statistical Manual of Mental Disorders (DSM-IV-TR) reports that only 12% to 30% of those with a specific phobia will seek treatment.

== Diagnosis ==
The DSM-IV-TR provides the following criteria for the diagnosis of a specific phobia:

- the persistent fear of an object or situation
- exposure to the feared object provokes an immediate anxiety response
- adult patients recognize that the fear is excessive, unreasonable or irrational (this is not always the case with children)
- exposure to the feared object is most often avoided altogether or is endured with dread
- the fear interferes significantly with daily activities (social, familial, occupational, etc.)
- minor patients (those under the age of 18) have symptoms lasting for at least six months
- anxiety, panic attacks or avoidance cannot be accounted for by another mental disorder

The book Phobias defines a panic attack as "a sudden terror lasting at least a few minutes with typical manifestations of intense fear". These manifestations may include palpitations, sweating, trembling, difficulty breathing, the urge to escape, faintness or dizziness, dry mouth, nausea or several other symptoms. As with other specific phobias, patients with cynophobia may display a wide range of these reactions when confronted with a live dog or even when thinking about or presented with an image (static or filmed) of a dog. Furthermore, classic avoidance behavior is also common and may include staying away from areas where dogs might be (e.g., a park), crossing the street to avoid a dog, or avoiding the homes of friends or family who own a dog.

== Cause ==
=== Age ===
Jeanette M. Bruce and William C. Sanderson, in their book Specific Phobias, concluded that the age of onset for animal phobias is usually early childhood, between the ages of five and nine. A study done in South Africa by Drs. Willem A. Hoffmann and Lourens H. Human further confirms this conclusion for patients with cynophobia and additionally found dog phobia developing as late as age 20.

=== Gender ===
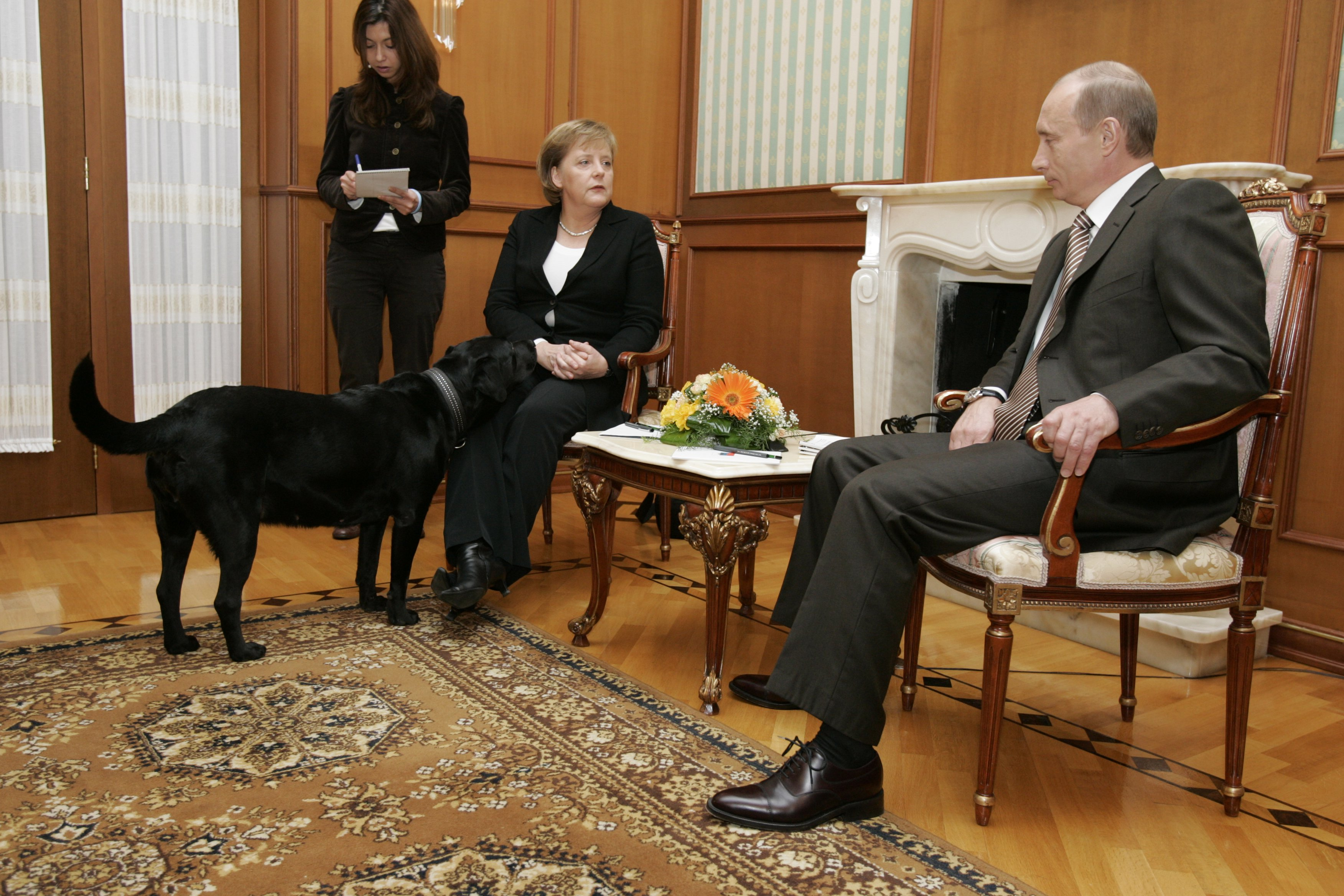
In a January 2007 meeting with Angela Merkel, Russian President Vladimir Putin brought in his labrador in front of the German Chancellor, who has a phobia of dogs.

Bruce and Sanderson also state that animal phobias are more common in women than men. Furthermore, B. K. Wiederhold, a psychiatrist investigating virtual reality therapy as a possible method of therapy for anxiety disorders, goes on to provide data that although prevalent in both men and women, 75% to 90% of patients reporting specific phobias of the animal subtype are women.

=== Acquisition ===
A current theory for fear acquisition presented by S. Rachman in 1977 maintains that there are three conditions by which fear is developed. These include direct personal experience, observational experience, and informational or instructional experience. For example, direct personal experience consists of having a personal negative encounter with a dog such as being bitten. In contrast, seeing a friend attacked by a dog and thus developing a fear of dogs would be observational experience. Whereas both of these types of experiences involves a live dog, informational or instructional experience simply includes being told directly or indirectly (i.e., information read in a book, film, parental cues such as avoidance or dislike, etc.) that dogs are to be feared.

A study was conducted at the State University of New York to distinguish the significance of these three conditions upon the development of cynophobia. Thirty-seven women ages 18 to 21 were first screened into two groups: fearful of dogs and non-fearful of dogs. Next, each woman was given a questionnaire which asked if she had ever had a frightening or painful confrontation with a dog, what her expectation was upon encountering a dog (pain, fear, etc.), and subjectively, what was the probability of that expectation actually occurring. The results indicated that, while non-fearful subjects had a different expectation of what would happen when encountering a dog, painful experiences with dogs were common among both groups; therefore, the study concluded that other factors must affect whether or not these painful experiences will develop into dog phobia.

Although Rachman's theory is the accepted model of fear acquisition, cases of cynophobia have been cited in which none of these three causes apply to the patient. In a speech given at the 25th Annual Meeting of the Society for Psychophysiological Research, Arne Öhman proposed that animal fears in particular are likely to be an evolutionary remnant of the necessity "to escape and to avoid becoming the prey of predators". Furthermore, in his book Overcoming Animal/Insect Phobias, Martin Antony suggests that in the absence of Rachman's three causes, providing that the patient's memory is sound, biological factors may be a fourth cause of fear acquisition—meaning that the fear is inherited or is a throwback to an earlier genetic defense mechanism. In any case, these causes may in actuality be a generalization of a complicated blend of both learning and genetics.

== Treatment ==
The most common methods for the treatment of specific phobias are systematic desensitization and in vivo or exposure therapy.

=== Systematic desensitization therapy ===
Systematic desensitization therapy was introduced by Joseph Wolpe in 1958 and employs relaxation techniques with imagined situations. In a controlled environment, usually the therapist's office, the patient will be instructed to visualize a threatening situation (i.e., being in the same room with a dog). After determining the patient's anxiety level, the therapist then coaches the patient in breathing exercises and relaxation techniques to reduce their anxiety to a normal level. The therapy continues until the imagined situation no longer provokes an anxious response.

This method was used in the above-mentioned study done by Drs. Hoffmann and Human whereby twelve female students at the Arcadia campus of Technikon Pretoria College in South Africa were found to possess symptoms of cynophobia. These twelve students were provided with systematic desensitization therapy one hour per week for five to seven weeks; after eight months, the students were contacted again to evaluate the effectiveness of the therapy. Final results indicated the study was fairly successful with 75% of the participants showing significant improvement eight months after the study.

However, in his book, Virtual Reality Therapy for Anxiety Disorders, Wiederhold questions the effectiveness of systematic desensitization, as the intensity of the perceived threat is reliant on the patient's imagination and could therefore produce a false response in regards to the patient's level of anxiety. His research into recent technological developments has made it possible to integrate virtual reality into systematic desensitization therapy in order to accurately recreate the threatening situation. At the time of publication, there had been no studies done to determine its effectiveness.

=== In vivo or exposure therapy ===
In vivo or exposure therapy is considered the most effective treatment for cynophobia, and involves systematic and prolonged exposure to a dog until the patient is able to experience the situation without an adverse response. This therapy can be conducted over several sessions or, as Lars-Göran Öst showed in a study done in 1988, can be done in a single multi-hour session. This study utilized 20 female patients with various specific phobias and ranging in age from 16 to 44. Patients were each provided with an individual therapy session in which Öst combined exposure therapy with modeling (where another person demonstrates how to interact with the feared object) to reduce or completely cure the phobia. As each patient was gradually exposed to the feared stimulus, she was encouraged to approach and finally interact with it as her anxiety decreased, concluding the session when fear had been reduced by 50% or eliminated. Once the session was concluded, the patient was then to continue interaction with the feared object on her own to reinforce what had been learned in the therapy session. Öst's results were collected over a seven-year period and concluded that "90% of the patients were much improved or completely recovered after a mean of 2.1 hours of therapy".

==== Self-help treatment ====
Although most commonly done with the help of a therapist in a professional setting, exposure to dogs is also possible as a self-help treatment. First, the patient is advised to enlist the help of an assistant who can help set up the exposure environment, assist in handling the dog during sessions, and demonstrate modeling behaviors. This should also be someone whom the patient trusts and who has no fear of dogs. Then, the patient compiles a hierarchy of fear-provoking situations based on their rating of each situation. For example, on a scale from 0 to 100, a patient may feel that looking at photos of dogs may cause a fear response of only 50; however, petting a dog's head may cause a fear response of 100. With this list of situations from least to most fearful, the assistant helps the patient to identify common elements that contribute to the fear (i.e., size of the dog, color, how it moves, noise, whether or not it is restrained, etc.). Next, the assistant helps the patient recreate the least fearful situation in a safe, controlled environment, continuing until the patient has had an opportunity to allow the fear to subside, thus reinforcing the realization that the fear is unfounded. Once a situation has been mastered, the next fearful situation is recreated and the process is repeated until all the situations in the hierarchy have been experienced.

Sample videos showing humans and dogs interacting without either exhibiting significant fear are available.

=== Recovery timeframe and maintenance ===
Whether utilizing systematic desensitization therapy or exposure therapy, several factors will determine how many sessions will be required to completely remove the phobia; however, some studies (such as a follow-up study done by Öst in 1996) have shown that those who overcome their phobia are usually able to maintain the improvement over the long term. As avoidance contributes to the perpetuation of the phobia, constant, yet safe, real-world interaction is recommended during and after therapy in order to reinforce positive exposure to the animal.

== See also ==
- Anxiety disorder
- List of fatal dog attacks
- List of phobias

== Footnotes ==
=== References ===
- Antony, Martin M. (2000). Phobic Disorders and Panic in Adults: A Guide to Assessment and Treatment. Washington, DC: American Psychological Association. ISBN 9781557986962.
- Antony, Martin M.; McCabe, Randi E. (2005). Overcoming Animal Insect Phobias: How to Conquer Fear of Dogs, Snakes, Rodents, Bees, Spiders More. Oakland: New Harbinger Publications. ISBN 9781572243880.
- Barlow, David H. (2002). Anxiety and its Disorders: The Nature and Treatment of Anxiety and Panic. New York: Guilford Press.
- Bruce, Timothy J.; Sanderson, William C. (1998). Specific Phobias: Clinical Applications of Evidence-Based Psychotherapy. Northvale: Jason Aronson Inc.
- Di Nardo, Peter A.; Guzy, Lawrence T.; Jenkins, Jill Ann; Bak, Rita M.; Tomasi, Susan F.; Copland, Michelle (1988). "Etiology and maintenance of dog fears". Behaviour Research and Therapy. 26 (3): 241–244. doi:10.1016/0005-7967(88)90005-8. PMID 3408458.
- Di Nardo, Peter A.; Guzy, Lawrence T.; Bak, Rita M. (1988). "Anxiety response patterns and etiological factors in dog-gearful and non-fearful subjects". Behaviour Research and Therapy. 26 (3): 245–251. doi:10.1016/0005-7967(88)90006-X. PMID 3408459.
- Diagnostic and Statistical Manual of Mental Disorders (DSM-IV-TR) (4th ed.). Washington DC: American Psychiatric Association. 2000.
- Doogan, Sharon; Thomas, Glyn V. (1992). "Origins of fear of dogs in adults and children: the role of conditioning processes and prior familiarity with dogs". Behaviour Research and Therapy. 30 (4): 387–394. doi:10.1016/0005-7967(92)90050-Q. PMID 1616473.
- Hoffmann, Willem A.; Human, Lourens H. (2003). "Experiences, characteristics and treatment of women suffering from dog phobia". Anthrozoös. 16 (1): 28. doi:10.2752/089279303786992323. S2CID 144024287.
- King, Neville J.; Clowes-Hollins, Viv; Ollendick, Thomas H. (1997). "The etiology of childhood dog phobia". Behaviour Research and Therapy. 35 (1): 77. doi:10.1016/s0005-7967(96)00067-8. PMID 9009047.
- Maj, Mario; Akiskal, Hagop S.; López-Ibor, Juan José; et al., eds. (2004). Phobias. Chichester: J. Wiley. ISBN 978-0-470-85837-0.
- Mavissakalian, Matig; Barlow, David H., eds. (1981). Phobia: Psychological and Pharmacological Treatment. New York: Guilford Press.
- Öhman, Arne (1986). "Face the beast and fear the face: animal and social fears as prototypes for evolutionary analyses of emotion". Psychophysiology. 23 (2): 123–145. doi:10.1111/j.1469-8986.1986.tb00608.x. PMID 3704069.
- Öst, Lars-Göran (1989). "One-session treatment for specific phobias". Behaviour Research and Therapy. 27 (1): 1–7. doi:10.1016/0005-7967(89)90113-7. PMID 2914000.
- Rachman, S. (1977). "The conditioning theory of fear acquisition: a critical examination". Behaviour Research and Therapy. 15 (5): 375–387. doi:10.1016/0005-7967(77)90041-9. PMID 612338.
- Rentz, Timothy O.; Powers, Mark B.; Smits, Jasper A. J.; Cougle, Jesse R.; Telch, Michael J. (2003). "Active-imaginal exposure: examination of a new behavioral treatment for cynophobia (dog phobia)". Behaviour Research and Therapy. 41 (11): 1337–1353. doi:10.1016/s0005-7967(03)00041-x. PMID 14527532.
- Secret, Mary; Bloom, Martin (1994). "Evaluating a self-help approach to helping a phobic child: a profile analysis". Research on Social Work Practice. 4 (3): 338–348. doi:10.1177/104973159400400305. S2CID 145786257.
- Wiederhold, B. K. (2005). Virtual Reality Therapy for Anxiety Disorders: Advances in Evaluation and Treatment (1st ed.). Washington, DC: American Psychological Association.
