= Roland Clark Davis =

American psychologist

- Born: December 20, 1902; Cambridge, Massachusetts
- Died: February 23, 1961 (aged 58); Yellow Springs, Ohio
- Education: Columbia University
- Scientific career
- Fields: Psychology
- Workplaces: University of Virginia; Indiana University
- Doctoral advisor: Robert S. Woodworth; Albert Poffenberger
- Doctoral students: Oran Wendle Eagleson

Roland Clark Davis (December 20, 1902– February 23, 1961) was an American psychologist recognized for his innovation in instrumentation and measurement of electrophysiological phenomena. Davis contributed to the measurement of electrodermal activity, gastric reflexes, and muscle action potentials. Davis published over 70 articles on psychophysiology and related topics across a 30-year career and mentored many graduate students at Indiana University Bloomington from 1931 through 1961.

== Personal history ==
Born in Cambridge, Massachusetts on December 30, 1902, Roland Clark Davis was the eldest child of William Chalmers Davis and Effie Estelle Clark. Davis earned his A.B. in English from Harvard in 1924 and his Ph.D. from Columbia in 1930. Upon leaving Columbia, Davis briefly worked as a research associate for the University of Virginia. Davis married Francis Oliver Meacham on September 12, 1927, in Petersburg, Virginia. They had two children, Susan Oliver and Christopher Meacham. In 1931, Davis was hired as an Acting Associate Professor at Indiana University where he established his psychophysiology laboratory in Science Hall. Davis died on February 23, 1961, at the age of 58 in Yellow Springs, Ohio. He was returning home from a meeting at the Fels Research Institute when he suffered a heart attack.

== Professional contributions ==
At Columbia, Davis was mentored by Robert Sessions Woodworth and Albert Poffenberger. In his 1930 dissertation, “Factors Affecting the Galvanic Reflex,” Davis reviewed hundreds of published articles on the galvanic skin response (GSR), producing an extensive and systematic review of GSR.

Davis was the first to use a vacuum tube as a way to control the electrical current during measurement of the GSR. Davis also developed a device that provided an uninterrupted measurement of arterial blood pressure that would not interfere with the subject’s true blood pressure, and he is credited with introducing the cathode-ray oscilloscope technique for measuring muscle action potentials. In collaboration with Douglas Ellson, Irving Saltzman, and Cletus Burke, Davis also developed a lie-detection device.

Using gastric balloons and a landmine detector to track the progress of steel balls through the gastrointestinal tracts of volunteers, Davis produced evidence that stomach contractions were largely absent when the stomach was empty, a finding that directly refuted the popular hypothesis of the time that hunger produced the most intense stomach contractions. Davis also used the electrogastrogram (EGG) to study the effects of particular drugs on gastric activity.

Davis also challenged the theory of homeostasis, arguing that the relevant terms needed to be more precisely defined and that responses could be adaptive even if they were not homeostatic:“Homeostasis can be maintained for one variable only at the expense of heterostasis in at least one other”.

== Teaching and Leadership ==
Davis was recognized as a leader in the Department of Psychology, and he was one of the few members of the senior faculty to remain in his position through World War II. Davis was also one of the founding members of the Society for Psychophysiological Research. At Indiana University, Davis directed the master's and doctoral theses of 29 graduate students, including Oran Wendle Eagleson.

== Notable publications ==
=== Electrodermal Activity ===
A Vacuum Tube for Stabilizing the Current During Measurements of the Galvanic Reflex (1929)
Factors Affecting the Galvanic Reflex (1930)
Electrical Skin Resistance Before, During, and After a Period of Noise Stimulation (1932)
Modification of the Galvanic Reflex by Daily Repetition of a Stimulus (1934)

=== Homeostasis and Response Patterning ===
Apparatus for Recording Autonomic States and Changes (1954)
Response Patterns (1957)
An Exploration of Somatic Response Patterns: Stimulus and Sex Differences (1957) The Pattern of Somatic Response During a Repetitive Motor Task and its Modification by Visual Stimuli (1957)
The Domain of Homeostasis (1958)

=== Action Potentials ===
A Cathode-Ray Oscilloscope Apparatus for the Psychological Laboratory (1931)
Properties of Electrodes Used in Recording Action Potentials from the Intact Organism (1936)
Methods of Measuring Muscle Tension (1942)
An Integrator and Accessory Apparatus for Recording Action Potentials (1948)
Adaptation of the Muscular Tension Response to Gunfire (1949)
Autonomic and Muscular Response and Their Relationship to Simple Stimuli (1955)

=== History of Psychology ===
American Psychology 1800-1885 (1936)
Physiological Psychology: A View of Fifty Years (1958)
