= Society for Psychophysiological Research =

The Society for Psychophysiological Research is an international scientific organization with over 800 members worldwide. The society is composed of scientists whose research is focused on the study of the interrelationships between the physiological and psychological aspects of behavior.

== Psychophysiology ==
“The body is the medium of experience and the instrument of action. Through its actions we shape and organize our experiences and distinguish our perceptions of the outside world from sensations that arise within the body itself.” (Jonathan Miller, The Body in Question, 1978)

Like anatomy and physiology, psychophysiology is a branch of science interested in bodily systems. However, anatomy is primarily concerned with body structures and relationships amongst structures, and physiology is primarily interested in the function of these structures or systems—or with how different parts of the body work. Psychophysiological research covers both of these concerns, but is also interested in connecting anatomy and physiology with psychological phenomena. In other words, psychophysiological research can consist of the study of social, psychological, and/or behavioral phenomena as they are reflected in the body. A great deal of psychophysiological research has focused on the physiological instantiation of emotion, but with increased access to measures of the central nervous system, psychophysiological research has also examined cognitive processes.

== Psychophysiological methods ==
- Skin conductance (level and response)
- Cardiac measures (heart rate, heart rate variability, contractility, both sympathetic nervous system and parasympathetic nervous system measures, blood pressure, plethysmography)
- Oculomotor and pupilometric measures
- Electromyographic activity
- Respiration
- Gastrointestinal activity
- Penile and vaginal plethysmography
- Electroencephalography
- Event-related potentials (ERP)
- Event-related frequency changes
- Hormonal and endocrinological measures
- Immune function
- Functional neuroimaging
- Positron emission tomography
- Functional magnetic resonance imaging (fMRI)
- Optical imaging
- Magnetoencephalography (MEG)

== History ==
As late as the 1950s, the field of psychophysiology was not a fully unified discipline. Psychophysiologists published in multiple non-specialist journals and were often not abreast of their colleagues’ work. However, in 1955, the influential early psychophysiologist Albert F. Ax (1913–1994) began circulating The Psychophysiology Newsletter, a slight collection of methodological observations and bibliographies for various psychophysiological methods. The first volume was free to subscribers, and for several years the newsletter circulated to fewer than 50 members.

Nonetheless, his work on the newsletter allowed Ax to organize and open communication amongst psychophysiologists from across North America. Through his work, the discipline and field of psychophysiology began to cohere. Scientists were better able to communicate not only their scientific findings, but also methodological advances they’d made in what was—at the time—a relatively crude and fledgling science. In the 1950s, Ax also began arranging formal meetings of these early psychophysiologists in what became known as the “Psychophysiology Group.” For several years, the group met regularly at the annual American Psychological Association conference. And at the 1959 meeting in Cincinnati, Ohio, the group decided to establish its own society, in part in order to oversee the transformation of The Psychophysiology Newsletter into a peer-reviewed scientific journal (which became the journal Psychophysiology). Aside from Ax, many scientists who became officers of the fledgling society were present, including R.C. Davis (chair of the organizing board), Marion Augustus “Gus” Wenger, Robert Edelberg, Martine Orne, Clinton C. Brown, and William W. Grings. The society took the name Society for Psychophysiological Research, and since its first informal gatherings, has grown to over 800 members worldwide and has held 51 annual meetings in North America and Europe.

The society continues to publish Psychophysiology, an influential monthly peer-reviewed journal interested in advancing psychophysiological science and human neuroscience, covering research on the interrelationships between the physiological and psychological aspects of brain and behavior.

== Annual meeting ==
The annual meeting of Society for Psychophysiological Research is attended by scientists from around the world. The meeting includes presentations of new theory, methods, and research in the form of invited addresses, symposia, poster sessions, and Presidential and Award addresses. At each meeting, the society also typically offers preconference workshops on specific topics or methodological advances. Topics covered in the 2011 preconference workshops included a bootcamp on Event-related potential Methodologies, Genetic Approaches to the Biology of Complex Traits, and Fundamentals of Pupillary Measures and Eye tracking. Recent meetings have been held in Portland, OR, Berlin, Germany, Vancouver, British Columbia, New Orleans, Louisiana, and Florence, Italy. Meetings have been scheduled to be held at various locations around the world.

== Awards ==
=== Distinguished Contributions to Psychophysiology ===
Past Awardees:

- Chester W. Darrow (1969)
- Roland Clark Davis (1969)
- Marion A. Wenger (1970)
- John I. Lacey (1970)
- Albert F. Ax (1973)
- Robert Edelberg (1974)
- William W. Grings (1978)
- Frances K. Graham (1981)
- Donald B. Lindsley (1984)
- Paul A. Obrist (1985)
- Peter H. Venables (1987)
- David Shapiro (1988)
- Eugene Sokolov (1988)
- Peter J. Lang (1990)
- John A. Stern (1993)
- Emanuel Donchin (1994)
- Risto Naatanen (1995)
- David T. Lykken (1998)
- Steven A. Hillyard (1999)
- John Cacioppo (2000)
- Arne Ohman (2001)
- Michael G.H. Coles (2002)
- Robert M. Stern (2004)
- Kees Brunia (2005)
- Marta Kutas (2007)
- William Iacono (2008)
- Niels Birbaumer (2009)
- Judith M. Ford (2010)
- Margaret Bradley (2011)
- Donald Fowles (2012)
- Gregory A. Miller (2013)

=== Distinguished Early Career Contributions to Psychophysiology ===
Past awardees:

- Connie Duncan (1980)
- Kathleen C. Light (1980)
- John Cacioppo (1981)
- William Iacono (1982)
- Graham Turpin (1984)
- Ray Johnson Jr. (1985)
- Alan J. Fridlund (1986)
- J. Rick Turner (1988)
- Ulf Dimberg (1988)
- Kimmo Alho (1990)
- Thomas W. Kamarck (1991)
- Steven A. Hackley (1992)
- George R. Mangun (1993)
- Christopher J. Patrick (1993)
- Cyma Van Petten (1994)
- Friedemann Pulvermuller (1995)
- Erich Schroger (1996)
- Brett A. Clementz (1997)
- Gabriele Gratton (1997)
- Christopher R. France (1998)
- Axel Mecklinger (1999)
- John J.B. Allen (2000)
- James Gross (2000)
- Martin Heil (2001)
- Eddie Harmon-Jones (2002)
- Thomas Ritz (2003)
- Frank Wilhelm (2004)
- Kent A. Kiehl (2005)
- Kara Federmeier (2006)
- Diego Pizzagalli (2006)
- Bruce D. Bartholow (2007)
- Markus Ullsperger (2008)
- Sander Nieuwenhuis (2009)
- James Coan (2010)
- Eveline Crone (2011)
- Greg Hajcak (2012)
- Ilse Van Dienst (2013)

=== Training Award Fellowships ===
Award funds graduate students and post-doctoral students who wish to obtain training in psychophysiology which falls outside of the scope of their home labs.

=== Student Poster Awards ===
Award signals excellence in research presented in a poster format by a student member.
