= Kara Federmeier =

American cognitive neuroscientist

Kara D. Federmeier
- Education: University of Illinois Urbana-Champaign (BS); University of California, San Diego (PhD)
- Scientific career
- Fields: Cognitive neuroscience Psychophysiology; Psycholinguistics
- Institutions: University of Illinois Urbana-Champaign; Beckman Institute for Advanced Science and Technology
- Thesis: Sense and structure: Electrophysiological investigations of semantic memory organization and use (1999)
- Doctoral advisor: Marta Kutas
- Website: cogandbrainlab.web.illinois.edu

Kara D. Federmeier is an American cognitive neuroscientist and psychophysiologist whose research examines the neural mechanisms of language comprehension, semantic memory, and cognitive aging. She is a professor of psychology at the University of Illinois Urbana-Champaign, with additional appointments in the Neuroscience Program and in the departments of Health and Kinesiology and Linguistics, and is a full-time faculty member at the Beckman Institute for Advanced Science and Technology. She directs the Cognition and Brain Lab and leads the Illinois Language and Literacy Initiative.

Federmeier primarily uses electroencephalography and event-related potentials, together with behavioral and eye-tracking methods, to study how people use context and knowledge to construct meaning. Her research has addressed predictive processing during language comprehension, the functional significance of the N400 component, differences between the cerebral hemispheres in language and memory processing, and changes in these mechanisms across the adult lifespan.

== Education and career ==
Federmeier received a B.S. summa cum laude in honors biology from the University of Illinois Urbana-Champaign in 1994. She earned her Ph.D. in cognitive science from the University of California, San Diego, in 2000, where she worked with cognitive neuroscientist Marta Kutas. Her dissertation examined the organization and use of semantic memory using event-related potentials.

After completing postdoctoral research at the Center for Research in Language at UC San Diego, Federmeier joined the psychology faculty at the University of Illinois in 2002. At Illinois, she directs the Cognition and Brain Lab, which studies the neural systems involved in language, meaning, and memory.

Federmeier served as president of the Society for Psychophysiological Research in 2017–2018.

== Research ==
Much of Federmeier's research uses event-related potentials to examine the timing and functional organization of semantic processing. A recurring focus of this work is the N400, an event-related potential elicited by potentially meaningful stimuli whose amplitude varies with factors including semantic relationships between words, contextual fit, predictability, and repetition.

=== Prediction in language processing ===
In her doctoral research with Kutas, Federmeier used ERPs to investigate whether sentence contexts can preactivate semantic information associated with likely upcoming words. In a 1999 study, participants read strongly constraining sentences that ended with the expected word, an anomalous word from the same semantic category as the expected completion, or an equally implausible word from a different category. Anomalous words related to the predicted completion elicited smaller N400 responses than unrelated anomalous words, a pattern interpreted as evidence that comprehenders had preactivated semantic features of the expected word before it appeared.

Subsequent reviews of predictive language processing have discussed this paradigm and related work as evidence that readers and listeners can preactivate information at semantic and other representational levels, while also emphasizing that prediction is graded and varies across individuals, contexts, and processing conditions. Federmeier reviewed the evidence for prediction, its possible relationship to language production mechanisms, and the conditions under which prediction may incur processing costs in a 2007 review.

=== Hemispheric contributions to language ===
Federmeier has also studied how the left and right cerebral hemispheres contribute to language comprehension. Using visual half-field presentation, her early work found that both hemispheres are sensitive to semantic relationships but differ in how they use sentence context. Left-hemisphere processing showed greater evidence of preactivation based on contextual expectations, whereas right-hemisphere processing was more strongly influenced by semantic relationships between the word that appeared and the preceding context.

Later research showed that both hemispheres respond to message-level sentence information, challenging interpretations of behavioral visual-field effects that treated the right hemisphere as largely insensitive to sentential context.

Federmeier proposed the Production Affects Reception in Left Only, or PARLO, framework to account for these patterns. The framework proposes that language production mechanisms contribute to comprehension primarily in the left hemisphere, supporting top-down prediction, whereas right-hemisphere comprehension is comparatively more dependent on incoming information and more likely to preserve a veridical representation of verbal material. In this account, normal language comprehension reflects complementary processing mechanisms operating across the two hemispheres.

=== Language comprehension and aging ===
Another line of Federmeier's research examines how language and semantic processing change across adulthood. ERP studies reviewed by Federmeier and colleagues indicate that the organization of semantic knowledge remains relatively stable in healthy aging, while the timing and mechanisms through which contextual information is used can change.

Her research has found that older adults as a group are less likely than younger adults to show ERP evidence that they have predicted semantic features of likely upcoming words. However, there is substantial variability among older adults. For example, individuals with higher verbal fluency scores were more likely to exhibit the prediction-related pattern observed in younger adults.

=== Connecting and considering ===
Federmeier's later work has examined the separability of different forms of semantic processing. In her 2022 presidential address to the Society for Psychophysiological Research, she distinguished between processes she termed "connecting" and "considering."

Connecting refers to the rapid and relatively obligatory activation of information in semantic memory when a meaningful stimulus is encountered. This process is associated with the N400 and is characterized as broadly similar in timing across stimulus types and individuals. Considering encompasses more selective and resource-dependent processes through which information may be predicted, selected, maintained, evaluated, or revised. The framework uses differences in the timing and functional sensitivity of electrophysiological responses to distinguish these partially separable contributions to comprehension.

== Awards and honors ==
In 2006, Federmeier received the Society for Psychophysiological Research's Award for Distinguished Early Career Contributions to Psychophysiology. In 2010, she received the Cognitive Neuroscience Society Young Investigator Award and a James S. McDonnell Foundation Scholar Award for research on the cognitive and neural mechanisms of meaning comprehension.

The University of Illinois named Federmeier a University Scholar in 2012. In 2013, she was named a College of Liberal Arts and Sciences Centennial Scholar and the Emanuel Donchin Professorial Scholar in Psychology.

Federmeier was elected a fellow of the Association for Psychological Science in 2012, the Psychonomic Society in 2013, and the Society for Psychophysiological Research in 2021. She was elected to the Society of Experimental Psychologists in 2022. In 2023, she was announced as an elected fellow of the American Association for the Advancement of Science, as part of its 2022 class of fellows.

== Selected publications ==
- Federmeier, Kara D.; Kutas, Marta (1999). "A Rose by Any Other Name: Long-Term Memory Structure and Sentence Processing". Journal of Memory and Language. 41 (4): 469–495. doi:10.1006/jmla.1999.2660.
- Federmeier, Kara D.; Kutas, Marta (1999). "Right words and left words: Electrophysiological evidence for hemispheric differences in meaning processing". Cognitive Brain Research. 8 (3): 373–392. doi:10.1016/S0926-6410(99)00036-1. PMID 10556614.
- Kutas, Marta; Federmeier, Kara D. (2000). "Electrophysiology reveals semantic memory use in language comprehension". Trends in Cognitive Sciences. 4 (12): 463–470. doi:10.1016/S1364-6613(00)01560-6.
- Federmeier, Kara D. (2007). "Thinking ahead: The role and roots of prediction in language comprehension". Psychophysiology. 44 (4): 491–505. doi:10.1111/j.1469-8986.2007.00531.x. PMC 2712632. PMID 17521377.
- Federmeier, Kara D.; Wlotko, Edward W.; Meyer, Aaron M. (2008). "What's 'right' in language comprehension: Event-related potentials reveal right hemisphere language capabilities". Language and Linguistics Compass. 2 (1): 1–17. doi:10.1111/j.1749-818X.2007.00042.x. PMC 2748422. PMID 19777128.
- Federmeier, Kara D.; Kutas, Marta; Schul, Rina (2010). "Age-related and individual differences in the use of prediction during language comprehension". Brain and Language. 115 (3): 149–161. doi:10.1016/j.bandl.2010.07.006. PMC 2975864. PMID 20728207.
- Kutas, Marta; Federmeier, Kara D. (2011). "Thirty Years and Counting: Finding Meaning in the N400 Component of the Event-Related Brain Potential". Annual Review of Psychology. 62: 621–647. doi:10.1146/annurev.psych.093008.131123. PMC 4052444. PMID 20809790.
- Federmeier, Kara D. (2022). "Connecting and considering: Electrophysiology provides insights into comprehension". Psychophysiology. 59 (1). doi:10.1111/psyp.13940. PMC 9009268. PMID 34520568.
