= Julian Koenig =

Julian Koenig may refer to:

- Julian Koenig (copywriter)
- Julian Koenig (neuroscientist)
