= Cyma Van Petten =

American cognitive neuroscientist

- Occupation: Professor of Psychology
- Awards: Society for Psychophysiological Research Early Career Award (1994)

Academic background
- Education: Reed College (BA); University of California, San Diego (PhD)
- Doctoral advisor: Marta Kutas

Academic work
- Discipline: Neuroscientist
- Sub-discipline: Cognitive neuroscience
- Institutions: Binghamton University

Cyma Kathryn Van Petten is an American cognitive neuroscientist known for electrophysiological studies of language, memory, and cognition. She is Professor of Psychology at the State University of New York at Binghamton where she directs the Event-Related Potential Lab. Van Petten was recipient of the Early Career Award from the Society for Psychophysiological Research in 1994.

== Biography ==
Van Petten received a B.A. in Psychology with honors at Reed College in 1981. As an undergraduate, she engaged in research on pain sensitivity. After graduating, she worked as a research assistant with Martha Neuringer at the Oregon Regional Primate Research Center, where she studied effects of dietary omega-3 fatty acid deficiency on vision.

Van Petten attended graduate school at the University of California, San Diego (UCSD) and obtained a Ph.D in Neurosciences in 1989 under the supervision of Marta Kutas. With Kutas, Van Petten did pioneering work in neurolinguistics. One of their first works examined neural responses to ambiguous words (e.g., bank) in a semantic priming task. Their collaborative focused on specific evoked response potentials such as the N400 that are differentially responsive to word frequency. Van Petten remained at UCSD as a post-doctoral fellow in the Department of Cognitive Science, where she collaborated with Seana Coulson on ERP studies of conceptual/semantic integration and metaphor comprehension.

Van Petten became a faculty member in the Psychology Department at the University of Arizona in 1991, and remained there until moving to Binghamton University in 2008. Much of her work has focused on source memory (i.e., recall of when or where something was learned), its underlying neural mechanisms, and the impact of aging on source versus item memory.

Van Petten's research program has been funded by grants from the National Institute of Neurological Disorders and Stroke, the National Institute on Aging, and the National Institute of Mental Health.

== Representative Publications ==
- Folstein, J. R., & Van Petten, C. (2008). Influence of cognitive control and mismatch on the N2 component of the ERP: A review. Psychophysiology, 45(1), 152–170.
- Van Petten, C. (2004). Relationship between hippocampal volume and memory ability in healthy individuals across the lifespan: Review and meta-analysis. Neuropsychologia, 42(10), 1394–1413.
- Van Petten, C., & Luka, B. J. (2006). Neural localization of semantic context effects in electromagnetic and hemodynamic studies. Brain and language, 97(3), 279–293.
- Van Petten, C., & Kutas, M. (1990). Interactions between sentence context and word frequency in event-related brain potentials. Memory & Cognition, 18(4), 380–393.
- Van Petten, C., Kutas, M., Kluender, R., Mitchiner, M., & McIsaac, H. (1991). Fractionating the word repetition effect with event-related potentials. Journal of Cognitive Neuroscience, 3(2), 131–150.
- Van Petten, C., & Senkfor, A. J. (1996). Memory for words and novel visual patterns: Repetition, recognition, and encoding effects in the event‐related brain potential. Psychophysiology, 33(5), 491–506.
