= Lindsay Gibson =

American clinical psychologist and writer

Lindsay C. Gibson is an American clinical psychologist who has written a number of Emotionally Immature Parents books.

== Life and work ==
Gibson has a Master's degree in Clinical psychology from Central Michigan University, and a Doctorate of Psychology from the Virginia Consortium Program in Clinical Psychology. She lives and works in Virginia Beach, Virginia, where she has a small private practice.

In her book, Adult Children of Emotionally Immature Parents (2015), Gibson describes four types of emotionally immature parents: "driven parents, who try to perfect everyone around them; passive parents, who avoid all conflict; rejecting parents, who don't seem to enjoy being with their child at all; and emotional parents, who have mood swings, are emotionally inconsistent and need others to stabilize them."

== Publications ==
- Who You Were Meant to Be: A Guide to Rediscovering Your Life's Purpose. New Horizon, 2002. ISBN 978-0882821870.
  - Second, updated edition. Oakland, CA: New Harbinger, 2020. ISBN 978-1693896699.
- Adult Children of Emotionally Immature Parents: How to Heal from Distant, Rejecting, or Self-Involved Parents. Oakland, CA: New Harbinger, 2015. ISBN 9781626251700.
- Recovering from Emotionally Immature Parents: Practical Tools to Establish Boundaries and Reclaim Your Emotional Autonomy. Oakland, CA: New Harbinger, 2019. ISBN 978-1684032525.
- Self-Care for Adult Children of Emotionally Immature Parents: Honor Your Emotions, Nurture Your Self, and Live with Confidence. Oakland, CA: New Harbinger, 2021. ISBN 978-1684039821.
- Disentangling from Emotionally Immature People: Avoid Emotional Traps, Stand Up for Your Self, and Transform Your Relationships as an Adult Child of Emotionally Immature Parents. Oakland, CA: New Harbinger, 2023. ISBN 978-1648481512.
