= Eugene Sokolov =

Soviet psychologist (1920–2008)

Eugene Nikolayevich Sokolov
- Born: September 23, 1920; Nizhny Novgorod, USSR
- Died: May 14, 2008; Moscow, Russia
- Education: Moscow State University (1984)
- Occupation: Neuroscientist
- Organization(s): Moscow State University; National Academy of Sciences; American Academy of Arts and Sciences; Finnish Academy of Science and Letters; Soviet Academy of Pedagogical Sciences; Russian Academy of Education
- Notable work: Perception and the Conditioned Reflex (1958), Mechanisms of Memory (1969), Artificial Sense Organs (1979), Neuronal Mechanisms of Memory and Learning (1981), Color Vision (1984), Neurophysiology of Memory and Learning (1987), Psychophysiology of Color Vision (1989)
- Awards: Pavlov Gold Medal Award (1984); SPR Award (1988); Lomonosov Award (1992)

Eugene Nikolayevich Sokolov (September 23, 1920 in Nizhny Novgorod – May 14, 2008 in Moscow), also known as Yevgeny Nikolayevich Sokolov (Russian: Евгений Николаевич Соколов), was a Russian researcher specialized in the field of neuroscience who worked at Moscow State University and founded the Soviet psychophysiology research. He is best known for his work on the orienting response and habituation. He authored Orienting Response Information on this subject.

He served as a lecturer at Cambridge and Oxford in 1969, was a visiting professor at the Massachusetts Institute of Technology since 1974, was elected to the National Academy of Sciences in 1975 as a foreign associate in the discipline of Psychological and Cognitive Sciences, and became an honorary member of the American Academy of Arts and Sciences in 1976. In 1984, he was elected to the Finnish Academy of Science and Letters and received the Pavlov Gold Medal Award from the Russian Academy of Sciences. In 1988, the Society for Psychophysiological Research awarded Sokolov a special diploma "for outstanding contributions to psychophysiology". In 1998 he was recognized by the International Organization of Psychophysiology as one of five most acclaimed neuroscientists of the twentieth century.

== Sokolov's Scientific School ==
Evgeny Sokolov founded his own scientific school, from which many outstanding specialists in the field of Soviet and Russian neuroscience emerged. Among them: Era Golubeva, Pavel Balaban, Nina Danilova, Chingiz Izmailov, Olga Vinogradova, Gennady Arakelov, Alexander Chernorizov, Stanislav Kozlovsky, Alexander Vartanov, Galina Paramey, Olga Sysoeva and many others.

== Sources for further reading ==
- J. Spinks, R. Näätänen, H. Lyytinen. Evgeny Nikolaevich Sokolov (1920–2008).
- F. Graham For Distinguished Contributions to Psychophysiology: Evgeny Nikolaevich Sokolov
- E. Nikonova. To the 100th Anniversary of E. N. Sokolov
