= Julian Koenig (neuroscientist) =

German scientist

- Born: June 20, 1985 (age 41); Kassel, Germany
- Education: Heidelberg University
- Known for: Vagus nerve and Neurostimulation in child and adolescent psychiatry
- Awards: Carlsson Wedemeyer Award (2011); Adolf-Ernst-Meyer Award (2014); Hermann Emminghaus Award (2022)
- Scientific career
- Fields: Neuroscience; child and adolescent psychiatry
- Workplaces: University of Cologne
- Website: www.koeniglab.de

Julian Koenig is a German neuroscientist who is tenured associated professor of biological child and adolescent psychiatry at University of Cologne. Koenig is co-editor of European Child & Adolescent Psychiatry, affiliate editor of the Journal of Child Psychology and Psychiatry, associate editor of the International Journal of Psychophysiology, and consulting editor of Psychophysiology.

== Research ==
His area of scientific expertise is child and adolescent psychiatry with a focus on autonomic neuroscience, combining neuroimaging and psychophysiology, to study brain-body interactions.

In his early career, Koenig conducted studies in experimental pain research. Focusing on psychiatric populations, he studied differences in pain sensitivity in patients engaging in self-injury, and the underlying biological mechanisms.

His work in experimental psychopathology illustrates the importance of autonomic nervous system function in normative and pathological development during childhood and adolescence, with an emphasis on the detrimental effects of early adversity. Koenig mainly studies adolescents with borderline personality disorder and depression engaging in non-suicidal self-injury.

He published a series of systematic reviews and meta-analysis on parasympathetic activity in schizophrenia, borderline personality disorder, bulimia nervosa, and depression.

Focusing on clinical translation, he has published research on non-invasive neuromodulation, in particular transcutaneous vagus nerve stimulation (tVNS), in children and adolescents with psychiatric disorders, and has led international efforts to develop minimal reporting standards in tVNS research.

== Education ==
Koenig earned his doctor scientiarum humanarum in medicine from Heidelberg University in 2013. He received the venia legendi for experimental child and adolescent psychiatry from Heidelberg University in 2019. He completed his post-doctoral training at Ohio State University and the University of Bern in Switzerland.

== Honors and awards ==
- 2011 Carlsson Wedemeyer Award for depression research
- 2014 Rising Star Young Investigator Early Career Award by the American Psychosomatic Society
- 2014 Adolf Ernst Meyer Award by the German College for Psychosomatic Medicine
- 2015 Outstanding Research Mentor (ORM) award by Ohio State University
- 2016 Thrasher Research Fund Early Career Award
- 2016 Early Career Investigator – International Travel Award by the Society of Biological Psychiatry
- 2015 - 2017 Physician-Scientist Fellow Medical Faculty Heidelberg University
- 2016 - 2018 Fellow of the Daimler and Benz Foundation
- 2019 Award for Distinguished Early Career Contributions to psychophysiology by the Society for Psychophysiological Research (SPR)
- 2022 Hermann Emminghaus Award by the German Society for Child and Adolescent Psychiatry
- 2024 Excellence Award by the European Society for the Study of Personality Disorders
- 2025 Outstanding New Investigator Award by the International Society of Behavioral Medicine (ISBM)
