= Fabri Literary Prize =

The Fabri Literary Prize was established in 2006 to honor the memory of Frances Fabri. A Holocaust survivor, Frances Fabri spearheaded efforts in the United States to record survivor stories, helping to create the interviewing protocols that are used widely today. Frances had much respect for the storyteller’s craft. Throughout her adult life she wrote chronicles of her experiences in the concentration camps and recorded oral histories of fellow survivors. A collection of her short stories, Crickets Would Sing, has been published posthumously by Plum Branch Press.

Matthew McKay, psychologist and co-founder of New Harbinger Publications, admired Frances’s determination to write and tell her story. His goal for The Fabri Literary Prize was to discover "deserving but underappreciated" works of fiction and have them published for the general book trade.

The Fabri Literary Prize is open to unpublished novels written for adults with a variety of interests. Books for children or young adults and books that are focused on the religious market are excluded from consideration. Each prizewinner receives a publishing contract with a $7,500 advance and a $5,000 marketing budget.

The Fabri Literary Prize is awarded once a year. The prize is administered by Boaz Publishing and deadlines for entry are announced on the Boaz Publishing web site. The winning novel is published by Boaz Publishing Company and distributed by New Harbinger Publications.

Each prize session has judges with years of experience in the book industry. The inaugural prize was judged by Jim Krusoe, author of Blood Lake and Other Stories, Tara Ison, author of The List, and Cyndi Hughes, book editor and producer of the Kansas Book Festival.

== Fabri Prize Winners ==
- Reservation Nation by David Fuller Cook (2007)
- The Great Days by Eli Brown (2008)
- Mike Tyson Slept Here by Chris Huntington (2009)
- Memories from Cherry Harvest by Amy Wachpsress (2012) published by Counterpoint Press in collaboration with Boaz
