= Chingis Izmailov =

Russian neuroscientist (1944–2011)

Chingis A. Izmailov
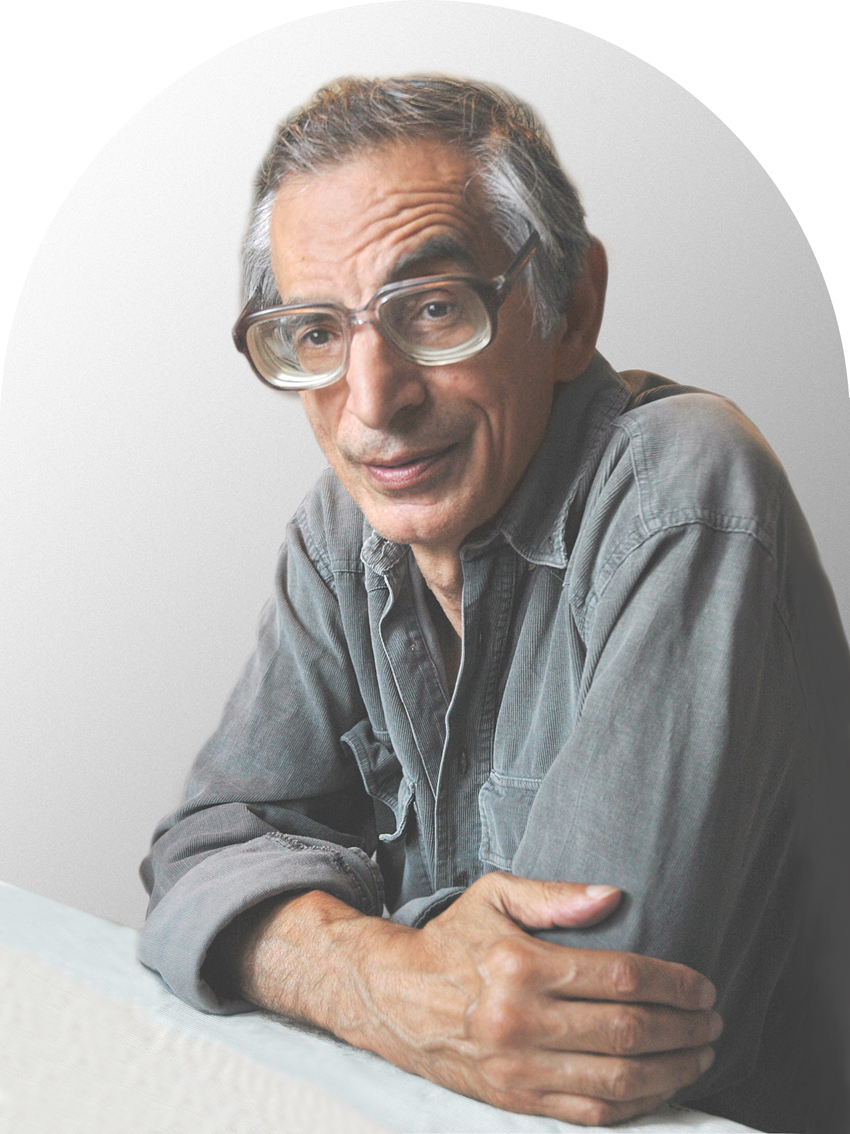
- Born: March 26, 1944; Derbent, USSR
- Died: September 28, 2011 (aged 67); Moscow, Russia
- Education: Lomonosov Moscow State University
- Known for: Spherical model of color space
- Title: Doctor of Psychological Sciences or "Доктор Наук"
- Awards: Distinguished Professorship
- Scientific career
- Fields: psychophysiology psychophysics
- Workplaces: Lomonosov Moscow State University

Chingis A. Izmailov (variant: Chingiz A. Izmailov; in Russian: Чингиз Абильфазович Измайлов) (March 26, 1944 – September 28, 2011) was a Russian psychophysiologist and psychophysicist, the principal author of the spherical model of color space.

== Biography ==
Chingis Izmailov was born in Derbent, USSR, in 1944. He first studied art and architecture in Moscow, then, in 1971, joined the department of Psychology of the Lomonosov Moscow State University, and in 1976 the same department's graduate school. In 1979 Chingis Izmailov got his PhD in psychology for his development of the spherical model of color space (with E. N. Sokolov as his scientific adviser), in 1985 was awarded his “big doctorate” (доктор наук, a Russian equivalent of the German Habilitation) for his work on color vision mechanisms and models. Chingis Izmailov was a professor at the Lomonosov Moscow State University since 1987, Distinguished Professor since 2005. He was a member of the central council of the International Brain Research Organization at UNESCO, participated in many professional societies, developed and taught many courses in color science, psychophysiology, psychophysics, and quantitative methodology. Chingis Izmailov died in 2011 after prolonged illness.

== Work ==
Chingis Izmailov's main achievements are in the field of color science, but he also contributed to other areas of psychophysiology and psychophysics, such as multidimensional scaling of geometric shapes and emotions in facial expressions. His experimental work and mathematical models were primarily based on various forms of multidimensional scaling, and on amplitudes of evoked potentials in humans and electroretinogram in frogs in response to an abrupt change of one stimulus to another.

Izmailov's model of color space represents both aperture and pigment colors as points on a four-dimensional sphere, such that the Euclidean distance (chord length rather than arc length) between two colors is nearly proportional to the estimates of their dissimilarity. Two axes of the sphere correspond to the color-opponent channels (red-green, blue-yellow), the other two axes represent the achromatic “whiteness” and “darkness” channels which Chingis Izmailov distinguished from brightness. The model allows one to quantitatively describe contrast and adaptation phenomena, as well as individual differences and color anomalies. In particular, the model provides a way of quantifying a spectrum of color abnormalities from the very mild anomalous variations to severe deficiencies, like protanopia and deuteranopia. Chingis Izmailov also studied the phylogenetic development of color vision, the emergence of saturation as a “composite” property from more basic circular color spaces, and the role of cultural factors and language in the utilization of color vision.

Another line of research led Chingis Izmailov to a spherical model of facial expressions of emotions. The sphere is four-dimensional, with interpoint Euclidean distances nearly proportional to numerical estimates of emotional differences. The axes of the sphere are interpreted as the opponent pleasant-unpleasant and active-passive channels, the remaining two being interpreted as “strength” and “calmness.”

Chingis Izmailov hypothesized that spherical models and other metric structures may not be applicable to properties of categorizable perceptual objects. Thus, colors lose their metric arrangement when they are colors of differently categorized objects (such as “apple” and “banana”) rather than colors of objects that do not belong to different categories (e.g., apertures or pigment patches). Chingis Izmailov also hypothesized, based on the evoked potential experiments, that the system responsible for detection of changes in brightness is physiologically different from the system responsible for detecting spatial patterns.

In the later period of his life Chingis Izmailov was working on a comprehensive theory of perception as having a formal structure of a language, with levels analogous to those of graphemes/phonemes, letters, and words. The “graphemes/phonemes” are represented by two-dimensional circular spaces (such as for line orientation or shades of gray), which are combined into higher-dimensional spherical stimulus spaces representing “letters” (such as the four-dimensional color space), which in turn are combined into “words,” categorized images of objects.

== Publications ==
=== Monographs ===
- Измайлов Ч. А. (1980). Сферическая модель цветоразличения. М.: МГУ. [Izmailov Ch. A. (1980). Spherical model of color discrimination. Moscow: Lomonosov Moscow State University Press (in Russian)].
- Соколов Е. Н., Измайлов Ч. А. (1984). Цветовое зрение. М.: МГУ,. [Sokolov E. N., Izmailov Ch. A. (1984). Color vision. Moscow: Lomonosov Moscow State University Press (in Russian)].
- Измайлов Ч. А., Соколов Е. Н., Черноризов А. М. (1989). Психофизиология цветового зрения. М.: МГУ. [Izmailov Ch. A., Sokolov E. N., Chernorizov A. M. (1989). Psychophysiology of color vision. Moscow: Lomonosov Moscow State University Press (in Russian)].

=== Articles ===
- Izmailov Ch.A., Chernorizov A.M. A Geometrical Approach to Research into Signal Recognition in Visual Systems of Humans and Animals. // Psychology in Russia: State of the Art, Vol. 3, 2010, р. 301–332.
- Bimler D.L., Paramei G.V., Izmailov Ch.A. Hue and saturation shifts from spatially induced blackness. // J. Opt. Soc. of Am. 2009. 26. 1. 163–172.
  - Izmailov Ch.A., Zimachev M.M. Detection of bimodal stimuli in the frog retina. // Neuroscience and Behavioral Physiology. 2008. Т. 38. No. 2. С. 103–114.
- Bimler D. L., Paramei G. V., Izmailov Ch. A. A whiter shade of pale, a blacker shade of dark: Parameters of spatially induced blackness. // Visual Neuroscience, 23, 2006. P. 579–582.
  - Izmailov Ch. A., Dzhafarov E. N., Zimachev M.M. Luminance discrimination probabilities derived from the frog electroretinogram. In E. Sommerfeld, R. Kompass, T. Lachmann (Eds.), Fechner Day 2001 (pp. 206–211). Lengerich: Pabst Science, 2001.
- Izmailov Ch.A., Sokolov E.N., Korshunova S.G. Multidimensional scaling of schematically represented faces based on dissimilarity estimates and evoked potentials of differences amplitudes. // Span J. Psychol. 2005. Vol. 8. P. 119–133.
- Izmailov Ch.A., Sokolov E.N. Subjective and objective scaling of large color differences. // C. Kaernbach, E. Schroger, H. Muller (eds.). Psychophysics beyond sensation. Laws and invariants of human cognition. Mahwah, NJ; London: Lawrence Erlbaum Associates, 2004. P. 27–42.
  - Izmailov Ch. A., Korshunova S. G., Sokolov E. N. The semantic component of the evoked potential differentiation. // Spanish Journal of Psychology, 11, 2008, pp. 323–342.
- Izmailov Ch.A., Korshunova S.G., Sokolov E.N. Relationship between visual evoked potentials and subjective differences between emotional expressions in «face diagrams». // Neuroscience and Behavioral Physiology. 2001. Т. 31. No. 5. С. 529–538.
- Izmailov Ch.A., Korshunova S.G., Sokolov E.N. Human visual evoked potentials to change in the emotional expression of a schematic face. // Журнал высшей нервной деятельности им. И. П. Павлова. 2000. Т. 50. No. 5. С. 816–818.
- Izmailov Ch. A. Spherical model of discrimination of self-luminous and surface colors. In: Geometric representations of perceptual phenomena / Eds. R. D. Luce, M. D. D’Zmura, and A. K. Romney. Mahwah, New Jersey. Lawrence Erlbaum Associates Publishers. 1995. P. 153–168.
- Izmailov Ch., Sokolov E.N. A semantic space of color names. // Psychological Science. 1992. Vol. 3. No. 2. P. 105–111.
- Izmailov Ch.A., Sokolov E.N. Spherical model of color and brightness discrimination // Psychological Science, 1991. Vol. 2. pp. 249–259.
- Paramei G. V., Izmailov Ch. A., Sokolov E. N. Multidimensional scaling of large chromatic differences by normal and color-deficient subjects. Psychological Science, 1991, 2, pp. 244–248.
- Izmailov Ch.A., Sokolov E.N. Multidimensional scaling of lines and angles discrimination. // Psychophysiological Explorations of Mental Structures / H.G. Geissler (ed.). Toronto-Bern-Stuttgart: Hogrefe and Huber Publishers, 1990. P. 181–189.
- Sokolov E. N., Izmailov Ch. A. The conceptual reflex arc: A model of neural processing as developed for color vision // Modern Issues in Perception / Eds. H. G. Geissler et al. Berlin.: VEB Deutscher Verlag der Wissenschaften, 1983. P. 192–216.
- Izmailov Ch. A. Uniform color space and multidimensional scaling (MDS) // Psychophysical Judgement and the Process of Perception / Eds. I. G. Geissler, P. Petzold. Berlin: VEB Deutscher Verlag der Wissenschaften, 1982. P. 52–62.
- Sokolov Е. N., Izmailov Ch. A., Schönebeck В. Vergleichende Experimente zur mehrdimensionalen Skalierung subjektiver Farbunterschiede und inrer internen sphärischen Repräsentationen // Zeitschrift für Psychologie. Band 190. Heft 3. 1982. S. 275–293.
- David L. Bimler, Chingis A. Izmailov and Galina V. Paramei Processing bimodal stimuli: integrality/separability of color and orientation. // Front. Psychol. 4:759. doi: 10.3389/fpsyg.2013.00759
