= Fabro (surname) =

Fabro or Del Fabro is a surname. Notable people with the surname include:

- Cornelio Fabro (1911–1995), Italian Catholic priest
- Dario Del Fabro (born 1995), Italian footballer
- Darwin Del Fabro, Brazilian actor
- Luciano Fabro (1936–2007), Italian sculptor, artist, and writer

== See also ==
- Fabri
