= Peter Venables =

British psychologist (1923–2017)

Peter H. Venables
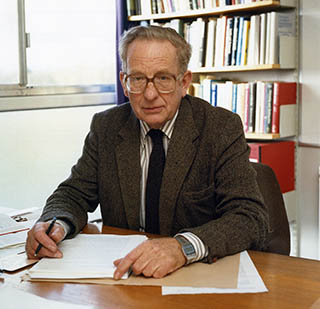
- Born: 3 April 1923; Ilfracombe, Devon, England
- Died: 26 April 2017 (aged 94); York, North Yorkshire, England
- Education: University College London
- Spouse: Agnes Hawkins (m. 1948)
- Children: 2
- Scientific career
- Fields: Psychology
- Workplaces: University of York

Peter Venables (3 April 1923 – 26 April 2017) was a British psychologist known for his contributions to the fields of schizophrenia and psychophysiology, including linking childhood malnutrition to later schizotypal personality. He also founded and served as the head of the department of Psychology at the University of York.

== Early life ==
Venables was born in Ilfracombe, Devon to parents Lilian (née Harris) and Harry. He attended Calday Grange Grammar School and at 16, worked at Post Office Telephones. In 1944, he joined the navy as a radar technician. In 1947, Venables earned a government grant to study psychology at University College London (UCL), graduating in 1951. He received his PhD degree in 1953.

== Career ==
Venables was the founder and former head of the department of Psychology at the University of York. He retired in 1988 to become Emeritus Professor at the University of York, where he continued to research. He was also a former President of the British Psychological Society (1979–1980), the Society for Psychophysiological Research (U.S., 1977–1978), and the Experimental Psychology Society (UK, 1968–1970).

Venables published more than 260 journal articles, book chapters, and books. Three of his articles have been recognized as citation classics. His contributions in the fields of schizophrenia and psychophysiology embraced a wide range of topics that included clinical, cognitive, neuroanatomical, psychophysiological, and neurodevelopmental issues.

== Awards and recognition ==
His awards included one for Distinguished Contributions to Psychophysiology (U.S., Society for Psychophysiological Research, 1987), the Zubin Award for Distinguished Contributions to the Discipline from the Society for Research in Psychopathology (U.S., 1990), Honorary Membership of the Experimental Psychology Society (UK, 1993), an award from the British Association for Cognitive Neuroscience for Outstanding Contributions to British Psychophysiology (UK, 2009), and most recently the Lifetime Achievement Award for Distinguished Contributions to Psychological Knowledge (British Psychological Society, 2014).

== Personal life ==
In 1948, Venable married Agnes "Ness" Hawkins (d. 2010), whom he had met during his time in the navy. They had two sons, Peter and Andrew.
