= Johann Samuel Ersch =

German bibliographer

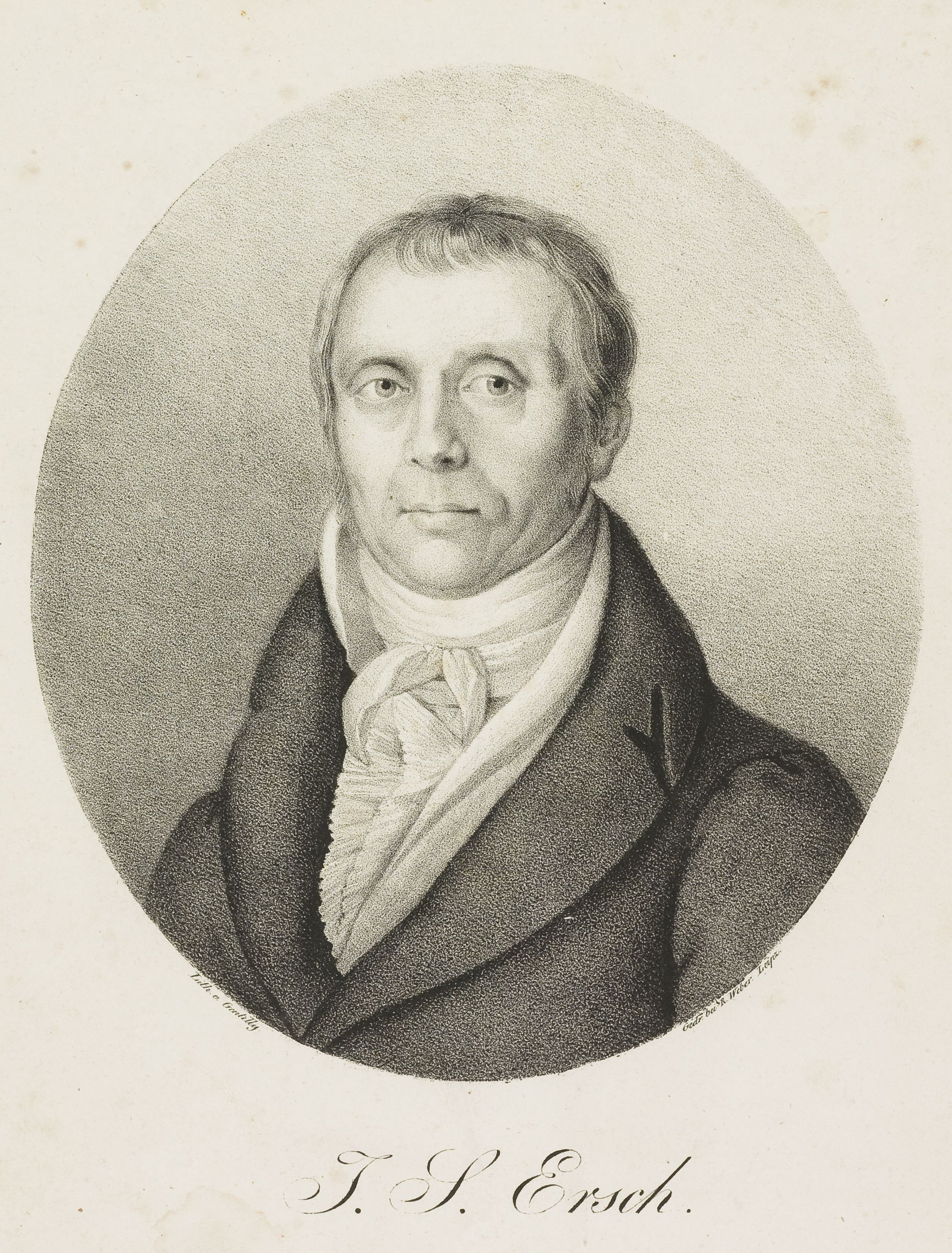
Johann Samuel Ersch (1766–1828)

Johann Samuel Ersch (23 June 1766 – 16 January 1828) was a German bibliographer, generally regarded as the founder of German bibliography.

== Biography ==
He was born in Großglogau (now Głogów), in Silesia, Kingdom of Prussia. In 1785 he entered the University of Halle with the view of studying theology; but soon became more interested in history, bibliography and geography. At Halle he made the acquaintance of Johann Ernst Fabri, professor of geography; and when Fabri was made professor of history and statistics at the University of Jena, Ersch accompanied him there, and helped him in the preparation of several works. In 1788 he published the Verzeichnis aller anonymischen Schriften, as a supplement to the 4th edition of Johann Georg Meusel's Gelehrtes Deutschland. The researches required for this work suggested to him the preparation of a Repertorium über die allgemeinen deutschen Journale und andere periodische Sammlungen für Erdbeschreibung, Geschichte, und die damit verwandten Wissenschaften (Lemgo, 1790–92). The fame which this publication acquired for him led to his being engaged by Christian Gottfried Schütz and Christoph Wilhelm Hufeland to prepare an Allgemeines Repertorium der Literatur, published in eight volumes (Jena and Weimar, 1793–1809), which condensed the literary productions of fifteen years (1785–1800),[2] and included an account not merely of the books published during that period, but also of articles in periodicals and magazines, and even of the criticisms to which each book had been subjected.[3]

While engaged in this great work Ersch also planned La France littéraire, which was published at Hamburg in five volumes, from 1797 to 1806. In 1795 he went to Hamburg to edit the Neue Hamburger Zeitung, founded by Victor Klopstock, brother of Gottlieb Klopstock, but returned in 1800 to Jena to take an active part in the Allgemeine Literaturzeitung. He also obtained in the same year the office of librarian in the university, and around 1802 was given the title of professor.[1][3]

In 1803 Ersch accepted the chair of geography and statistics at Halle, and in 1808 was made principal librarian. He here projected a Handbuch der Deutschen literatur seit der mitte des achtzehnten jahrhunderts bis auf die neueste zeit (Leipzig, 1812–14) and, along with Johann Gottfried Gruber, the Allgemeine Encyclopädie der Wissenschaften und Künste (Leipzig, 1818) which he continued as far as the 18th volume. The accuracy and thoroughness of this monumental encyclopaedia made it an indispensable book of reference. He died, aged 61, in Halle.
