= Arne Öhman =

Swedish psychologist and professor (1943–2020)

- Born: May 31, 1943; Ljusdal, Sweden
- Died: March 19, 2020 (aged 76)
- Citizenship: Sweden
- Education: University of Uppsala
- Spouse: Gunilla Bohlin
- Children: Martin; Kristina
- Awards: Award for Distinguished Contribution to Psychophysiology from the Society for Psychophysiological Research (2001)
- Scientific career
- Fields: Experimental psychology; Psychophysiology
- Workplaces: University of Uppsala; Karolinska Institutet
- Thesis: Orienting reactions, cognitive processes, and conditioned behavior in long interstimulus interval electrodermal conditioning (1971)

Arne Öhman (31 May 1943 – 19 March 2020) was a Swedish psychologist who served as professor of psychology at the Karolinska Institute from 1993 to 2010, where he was the head of the Department of Clinical Neuroscience from 2001 to 2004. He previously served as a professor of clinical psychology at the University of Uppsala from 1982 to 1993. He was noted for his research in the fields of experimental psychology and psychophysiology, and on the psychology of emotion. He was president of the Society for Psychophysiological Research from 1984 to 1985, and received its award for Distinguished Contribution to Psychophysiology in 2001. He was a fellow of the Center for Advanced Study in the Behavioral Sciences from 2005 to 2006. He was named a member of the Academia Europaea in 1992 and the Royal Swedish Academy of Sciences in 1998. He was an elected member of the Nobel Assembly at the Karolinska Institute from 1997 to 2010, as well as a fellow of the Association for Psychological Science.
