= Kurt Fabri =

Kurt Ernestovich Fabri
- Born: 1 May 1923; Vienna, Austria
- Died: 3 June 1990 (aged 67); Moscow, Russian SFSR, Soviet Union
- Education: Moscow State University (1949)
- Scientific career
- Fields: Ethology, comparative psychology
- Workplaces: Moscow State University

Kurt Ernestovich Fabri (Russian: Курт Эрнестович Фабри; 1 May 1923 – 3 June 1990) was an Austrian-born Soviet biologist and professor at Moscow State University who contributed to the scientific study of animal behavior in the Soviet Union.

== Biography ==
Born in Vienna, the young Kurt Fabri immigrated with his family to the Soviet Union, where his father, the prominent communist writer and journalist Ernst Fabri, was given political asylum amid the political turmoil in their native Austria in 1932.

Kurt Fabri began studying biology at the M. V. Lomonosov Moscow State University in 1940, but was conscripted into the Red Army after Operation Barbarossa and served as an army medic and German language translator in World War II. He returned to his studies in 1946 and graduated from Moscow State University in 1949.

During the 1950s, when much of the work on animal behavior was still regarded as a pseudoscience by the Soviet scientific establishment, itself preoccupied with promoting pseudoscientific theories such as Lysenkoism, Fabri held jobs at a library and a radio station and worked at the V. L. Durov Animal Theater.

Fabri returned to scientific work in 1964 as an animal behavior researcher at the Biophysics Institute at Pushchino-na-Oke and joined the faculty of Moscow State University as lecturer in ethology in 1966. Throughout this time, Fabri corresponded with scientific experts and publications in East Germany, Austria, and the Soviet Union. As an ethologist, Fabri contributed to the popularization of the work of the pioneering ethologists Konrad Lorenz and Nikolaas Tinbergen in the USSR.

Fabri headed a research group of the Academy of Pedagogical Sciences of the USSR in 1966–1971, investigating the psychological aspects of the interaction of pre-school children with animals. He earned his candidate of sciences degree for a dissertation in biology in 1967.

Awarded a Doctor of Sciences degree in psychology for his seminal 1976 monograph on the foundations of zoopsychology, he was appointed full professor of general psychology of Moscow State University's faculty of psychology in 1983.

The main areas of Fabri's scientific work consisted of investigating the ontogenesis of animal behavior and psychology, psychological development, the psychology of primates, and the ethological and biopsychological prerequisites of anthropogenesis.

== Selected publications ==
Fabri authored more than two hundred publications during his scientific career.

- «Хватательная функция руки приматов и факторы ее эволюционного развития»
  (The Grasping Function of the Primate Hand and Factors in its Evolutionary Development). Leningrad, 1964.
- «Основы зоопсихологии»
  (Foundations of Zoopsychology). Moscow, 1976. (Second edition 1993).
- «Игры животных и игры детей (сравнительно-психологические аспекты)», Вопросы психологии №3 С 26–34
  ("Animal Games and Children's Games (Comparative Psychological Aspects)", Voprosy psikhologii [Questions of Psychology] 3, pp. 26–34), 1982.
- «Игра у животных»
  (The Play of Animals). Moscow, 1985.
- «Введение в общую и прикладную ихтиопсихологию»
  (Introduction to General and Applied Ichthyopsychology). Moscow, 1988.
