= Search activity concept =

Search activity concept (SAC) is a psychophysiological concept that integrates subject's behavior, resistance to stress and deteriorating factors, pathogenetic mechanisms of different mental and psychosomatic disorders, REM sleep functions, brain monoamines activity and brain laterality.

== History ==
The term SAC was coined during the 1970s by V.S. Rotenberg together with V.V. Arshavsky on the basis of the physiological investigations on humans and animals according to the role of different forms of behaviour in body resistance to stress and diseases.

== Behavioural attitudes ==
SAC distinguishes the following types of behaviour:

- Search Activity (SA), which is designed to change the situation or the subject's attitude to it, with uncertainty regarding the results of this activity (indefinite probability forecast), but with constant monitoring of the results at all stages of activity. In humans and high animals SA is a component of fight, flight and orienting behavior; in animals it is a component of self-stimulation; in humans it is a main component of creative activity. In animals the indication of SA is a high-amplitude and well-organized hippocampal theta rhythm.
- Stereotyped behaviour (St), which uses habitual skills and algorithms with predictable results and is adaptive in non-stressful conditions; SA and St both belong to purposeful behaviour.
- Chaotic (panicky) behavior (Ch), which may seem to imitate SA however does not include monitoring of the results of activity. It is fraught with inadequate actions and finally often leads to renunciation of search;
- Renunciation of search (passive behavior, Pa), which manifest itself in reaction of surrender (giving up), helplessness and freezing.

== Behaviour and body resistance ==
All forms of behaviour that contain SA belong to coping and increase the body's resistance to stress and deteriorating factors. Absence of SA leads in stressful conditions to the development of mental (depression, anxiety) and psychosomatic disorders. In opposite to the concept of coping, the value of SA lies in the process itself, not in the pragmatic outcomes of behaviour.

== Behaviour and paradoxical (REM) sleep ==
According to SAC, covert SA in REM sleep during dreams compensates for the lack of SA in the preceding wakefulness and ensures the resumption of SA in the wakefulness that follows. Functionally sufficient REM sleep dreams (based in humans on high right hemispheric skills) is crucial for preventing mental and psychosomatic disorders. In animals REM sleep deprivation combined with Pa causes death.

== Behaviour, REM sleep and brain monoamines ==
It is a positive feedback between SA and brain monoamines in wakefulness. In REM sleep SA is based on the nonmodulated brain dopamine activity and provides the condition for the resensitization of the norepinephrine postsynaptic receptors.

== Behaviour and some mental disorders ==
Paranoid schizophrenia is explained as a misdirected and irrelevant SA as an outcome of the functional deficiency of the polysemantic right-hemispheric way of thinking. Anorexia nervosa displays a misdirected pathological SA (confrontation with challenges like appetite, pressure of relatives etc.) as a compensation of deficient SA in other domains.
