= Jemma King =

Australian psychologist

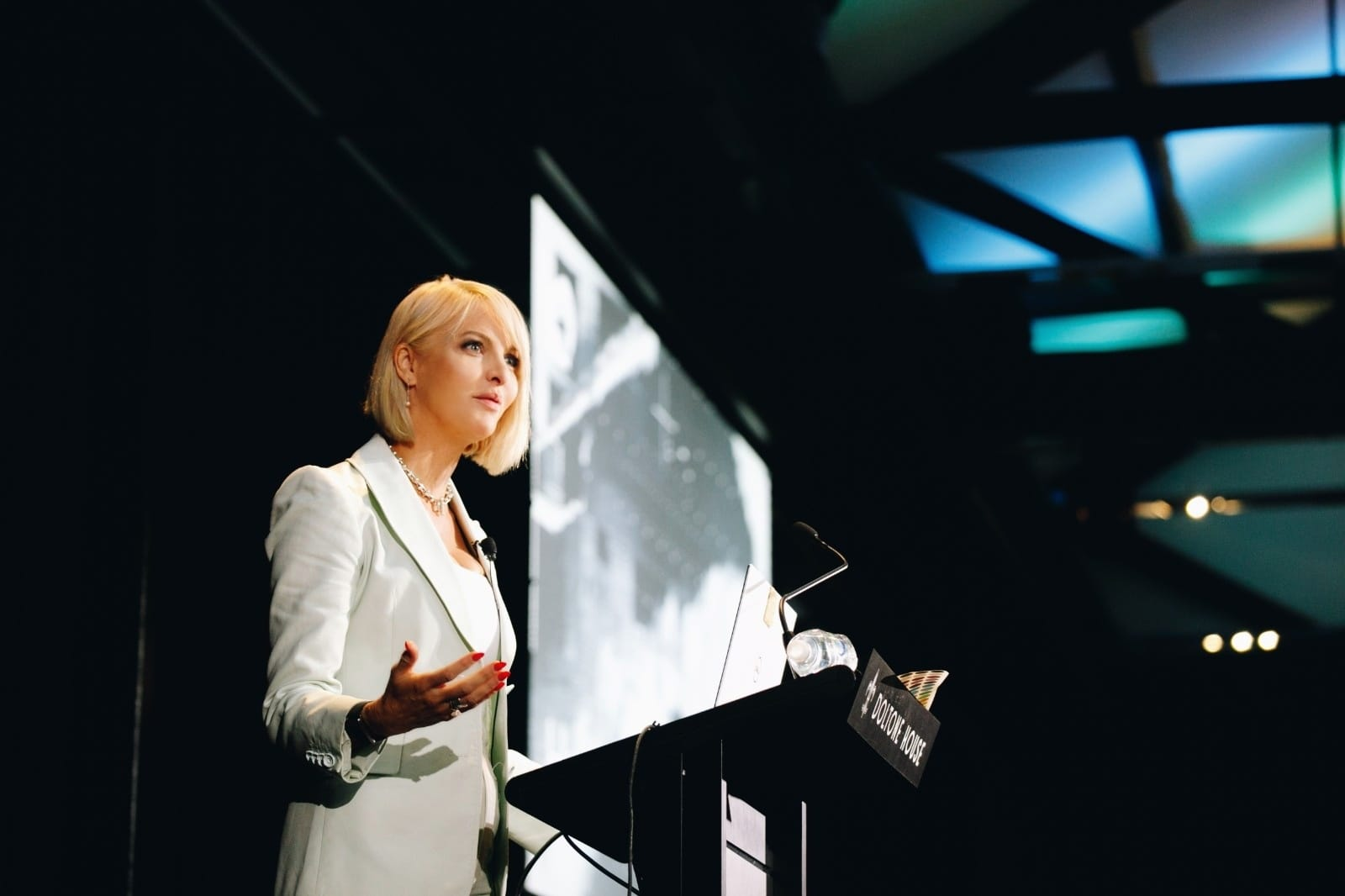
- Giving an address in 2024
- Education: University of Queensland
- Occupation: Researcher
- Employer: University of Queensland

Jemma King is an Australian researcher who has worked on emotional-intelligence training and psycho-physiological stress in sport and military settings. She a research fellow in the School of Psychology at the University of Queensland (UQ).

== Early life and education ==
King spent her childhood moving around Australia as the family followed her father's hotel-management postings, living in Adelaide, Sydney, Brisbane, Townsville and Canberra; the itinerant lifestyle, she has said, sparked an early fascination with individual differences in behaviour. After leaving school she worked briefly as a fashion model and performed stunt-double work on Police Academy 7 before turning full-time to psychology. She earned a Bachelor of Science in Psychology and a first-class Honours degree in Business Management at UQ, then completed a PhD in Human Behaviour at the UQ Business School. Her thesis, Emotional intelligence and its effects on biomarkers of workplace stress (2020), examined cortisol responses to cyber-ostracism and laid the foundation for her later applied programmes.

== Career ==
Since 2020 King has held an honorary research fellowship at UQ's School of Psychology, supervising postgraduate projects on stress, sleep and resilience. She has published peer-reviewed work on military populations, including a 2023 Military Medicine study that linked sleep-wake consistency with psychological resilience among U.S. Army soldiers stationed in the Arctic.

King developed a pre-deployment "Performance Optimisation Program" for military personnel, the programme has since been extended to high-performance sport organisations such as the Australian Olympic swim team. In the private sector she is the director of BioPsychAnalytics, advises McKinsey & Company, and delivers leadership modules for the University of Sydney MBA program and for the Australian Defence College.

In 2024, the ABC's Australian Story profiled her friendship with Olympic swimmer Shayna Jack, describing King as a "human behaviourist" who helped the athlete rebuild resilience after a high-profile doping case.

== Personal life ==
King lives in Brisbane and is the mother of three children.

== Awards and recognition ==
At the eighteenth Global Wellness Summit in St Andrews, Scotland, in November 2024, King and Wim Hof received the Bennett Family Award for Collaboration in the Science of Wellness.
