= Marion A. (Gus) Wenger =

American psychologist

Marion Augustus "Gus" Wenger (March 12, 1907 – July 26, 1982) was an American psychologist who specialized in psychophysiology. He was born in Wheeling, West Virginia. At an early age he was nicknamed Gus. Wenger died at the age of 75 due to heart failure.

== Academic career ==
Wenger graduated from the University of Michigan by the late 1920’s with a BA degree. After working a few years in his family business, he pursued a Doctorate in educational psychology first at the University of Michigan and received his degree from the University of Iowa by 1935.

== Employment ==
Wenger worked as a research assistant at the University of Chicago where he examined children with abnormal mental health problems, working with his colleague F. N. Freeman on a test battery that was used within a longitudinal study that focused on mental development. By 1938, he was assigned as chair of the Department of Psychophysiology at the Samuel S. Fels Research Institute. Wenger also was offered an Assistant Professor position at Antioch College in Yellow Springs, Ohio. In 1944, he was asked by J.P. Guliford to work for the Santa Ana Army Air Force Team as a research assistant. During this time, he assisted in developing a test battery to help choose affective Army Air Force recruits. He finally joined the Department of Psychology at University of California at Los Angeles (UCLA) in 1945 where he worked until his retirement in the mid-70’s.

== Impact on psychology ==
Wenger made significant strides in the fields of human development and psychophysiology. Wenger was known for blending psychology and physiology in his research which at the time was fairly uncommon. He contributed his own original work in psychophysiology when he published Studies of Autonomic Balance in Army Air Forces Personnel in 1948. After spending a significant amount of time at the Santa Ana Army Air Base working on a test battery with colleague J.P. Guilford, he was able to conduct his own personal research (which led to the creation of Studies of Autonomic Balance in Army Air Forces Personnel). The monograph was a part of the Aviation Psychology Program of the Army Air Forces. What sparked interest in conducting this research was the examination of a previous study done at the Fels Research Institute of Antioch College in 1941. In this previous study, researchers examined child participants and how certain environmental factors affected their autonomic nervous system and system of skeletal musculature. Neither of these factors were reasonably measured to an adequate level before it was put on hold due to World War II escalating; however, researchers saw a great deal of promise and potential in future tests.

After the war concluded, psychologists working for the Army Air Forces (Wenger included) reexamined the study that was done at the Fels Research Institute. They believed that this study could be applied to the Army Air Forces as a way to rule out unqualified recruits. It was already known by pilot instructors that excess tension in a pilot’s muscles can lead to adverse effects upon their ability to fly a plane. Instructors also understood that a pilot needs to have stable emotions and immense concentration especially when maneuvering in a dangerous environment such as a warzone. There was very little research in relation to adults and the factors of muscle tension and autonomic balance previous to his monograph.

Wenger decided to test 1,000 air force pilots, 500 navigators and 500 bombardiers in his research. He used a number of uncontrolled variables that pilots might see while in a war scenario such as “humidity, barometric pressure, temperature, and time of day” to see their effects on muscle tension and autonomic balance. Some of the measures he observed were measurements such as white blood count, blood sugar, finger temperature, height-weight ratio, oxygen consumption. Wenger also compared different groups such as flight students to participants who were fatigued or suffered from psycho neuroticism.

Studies of Autonomic Balance in Army Air Forces Personnel is considered an internationally known monograph within psychophysiology. It placed him in a worthy and recognizable position within psychology and physiology. Wenger’s research for the Army Air Forces helped to not only pave the way for a strong test battery for air force recruitments but also to solidify psychophysiology as a key division in psychology.

Wenger also contributed in the “...conceptualization of the role of the autonomic nervous system in emotional behavior.” Some prominent works associated with this topic were Emotion as visceral action: An extension of Lange’s theory, and Mechanical emotion. The second work is considered a response to the psychologist Boring which deals with Wenger’s perspective on viscero-affective behavior. Both works paved the way for how modern researchers see the connection between emotions and the autonomic nervous system and helped create a foundation for psychophysiology and progressed further understanding of emotional behavior in humans.

During his time as a professor at UCLA, he helped mentor 30+ doctoral students, 15 post-doctorate mentees ”. During the McCarthy era, teaching staff and research assistants were forced to sign a contract stating that they would remain loyal to the state. Wenger took the initiative to persuade his fellow staff to sign the oath, especially students that needed state funding in order to allow them to stay at the university. In protest of the forced oath of loyalty, Wenger stepped down from his position as chair of psychology; hence, showing his dedication to the scientific community.

== Publications ==
- Changes in autonomic balance during phasic anxiety. Psychophysiology, 1(3), 267-271. (1965)
- Autonomic Activity During Sexual Arousal. Psychophysiology, 4(4), 468–478. (1968)
- Wenger, M. A. (1948). Studies of Autonomic Balance in Army Air Forces Personnel (Vol. 19). Berkeley, CA: Univ. of California Press
- Wenger, M.A. Emotion as visceral action: An extension of Lange’s theory. In M.L. Reymert (Ed.), Feeling and emotion; The Moosehart-Chicago Symposium. New York: McGraw-Hill, 1950. pp. 3–10
- Wenger, M.A. Mechanical emotion. Journal of Psychology. 1950. 29, 101-108[5]
