= MSU Faculty of Psychology =

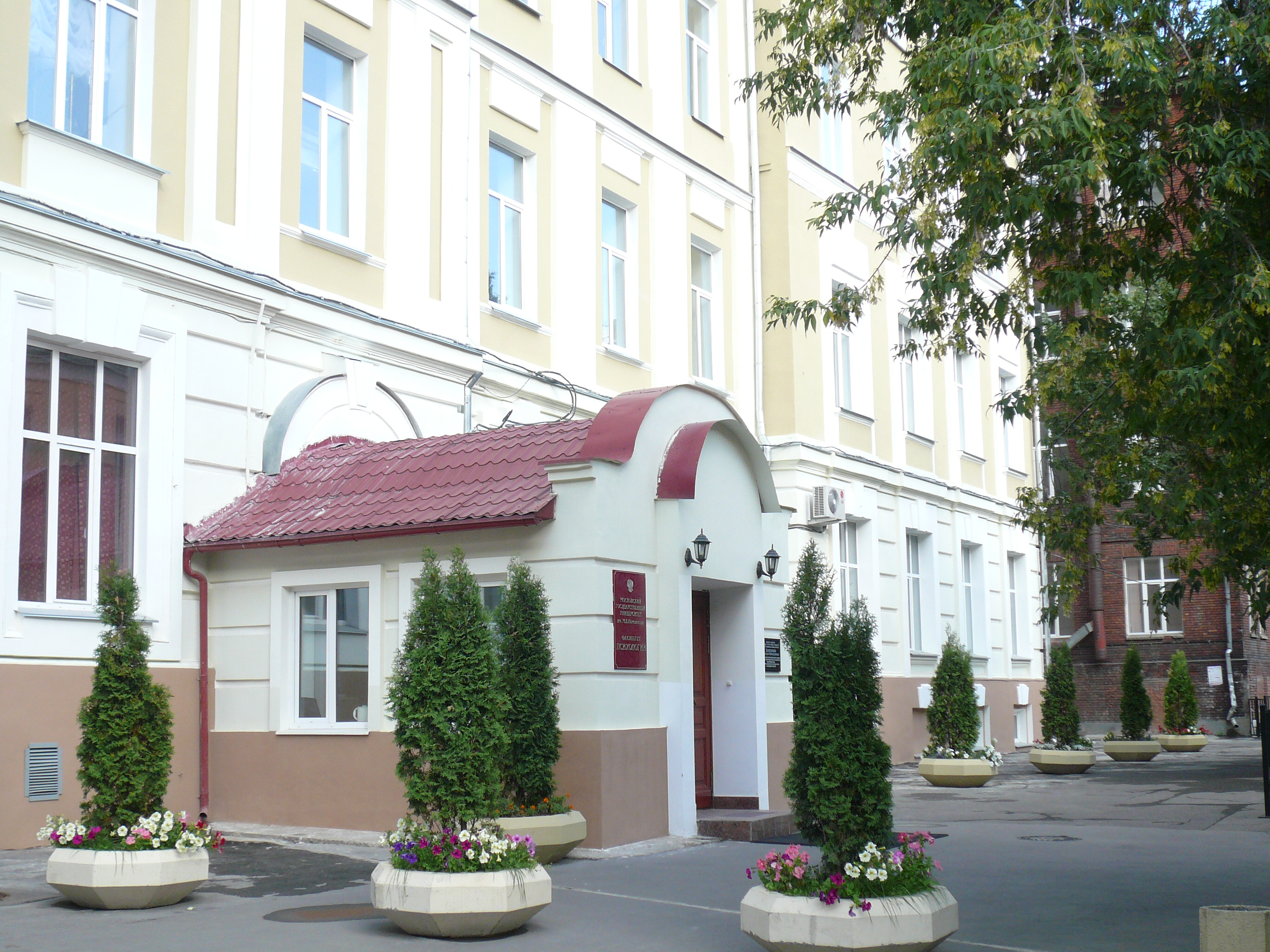
MSU Faculty of Psychology

MSU Faculty of Psychology (Russian: Факультет психологии МГУ) is a faculty of the Moscow State University, which was established in 1966 and headed by Aleksei Leontiev until his death in 1979. At various times, a number of researchers have worked at the Faculty, such as Sergei Rubinstein, Alexander Luria, Eugene Sokolov, Chingis Izmailov, Galperin, Bluma Zeigarnik, and Daniil Yelkonin.
