= Georg Fabri =

German Roman Catholic prelate

Most Reverend Georg Fabri
- Auxiliary Bishop of Mainz; Titular Bishop of Bir Seba
- Church: Catholic Church
- Diocese: Diocese of Mainz
- In office: 1490–1498

Orders
- Consecration: 13 Mar 1490

Personal details
- Died: 1498 Mainz, Germany

Georg Fabri, O.P. (died 1498) was a Roman Catholic prelate who served as Auxiliary Bishop of Mainz (1490–1498).

== Biography ==
Georg Fabri was ordained a priest in the Order of Preachers. On 15 Jan 1490, he was appointed during the papacy of Pope Innocent VIII as Auxiliary Bishop of Mainz and Titular Bishop of Bir Seba. On 13 Mar 1490, he was consecrated bishop. He served as Auxiliary Bishop of Mainz until his death in 1498.

== External links and additional sources ==
- Cheney, David M. "Diocese of Mainz". Catholic-Hierarchy.org. (for Chronology of Bishops) ^{[self-published]}
- Chow, Gabriel. "Diocese of Mainz (Germany)". GCatholic.org. (for Chronology of Bishops) ^{[self-published]}
