= Psychophysiology (journal) =

- Discipline: Psychophysiology
- Language: English
- Edited by: Monica Fabiani

Publication details
- History: 1964-present
- Publisher: Wiley-Blackwell on behalf of the Society for Psychophysiological Research
- Frequency: Monthly
- Open access: Hybrid
- Impact factor: 4.016 (2020)

Standard abbreviations
- ISO 4: Psychophysiology

Indexing
- CODEN: PSPHAF
- ISSN: 0048-5772 (print); 1469-8986 (web)
- LCCN: 64009473
- OCLC no.: 884671082

Links
- Journal homepage; Online access; Online archive

Psychophysiology is a monthly peer-reviewed scientific journal published by Wiley-Blackwell on behalf of the Society for Psychophysiological Research. The editor-in-chief is Monica Fabiani (University of Illinois at Urbana-Champaign).

== Abstracting and indexing ==
The journal is abstracted and indexed in:

- Biological Abstracts
- BIOSIS Previews
- Chemical Abstracts Service
- Current Contents/Life Sciences
- Current Contents/Social & Behavioral Sciences
- EBSCO databases
- Index Medicus/MEDLINE/PubMed
- ProQuest databases
- PsycINFO
- Science Citation Index
- Scopus
- Social Sciences Citation Index

According to the Journal Citation Reports, the journal has a 2020 impact factor of 4.016.
