= Francesco Saverio Fabri =

Italian architect

- Born: 11 January 1761; Medicina, Bologna, Papal States
- Died: 23 October 1817 (aged 56); Lisbon, Kingdom of Portugal
- Education: Accademia Clementina
- Known for: Architecture
- Notable work: Palace of Ajuda
- Movement: Baroque and neoclassicism
- Spouse: Barbara de Sousa Vieira (m. 1799)

Francesco Saverio Fabri (Portuguese: Francisco Xavier Fabri; 11 January 1761 – 23 October 1817) was an Italian architect, active in Portugal. He played a key role in the introduction of neoclassicism in Portugal.

== Biography ==
=== Early life and education ===
Francesco Saverio Fabri was born in Medicina, Bologna, in 1761. He qualified after studying at the Accademia Clementina, Bologna, where he was influenced by the great tradition of the Bolognese school as well as by the Palladianism that was current when he received his artistic and technical training. In 1783 and in 1788 he won the Marsigli-Aldrovandi prize in the First Architecture Class. A visit to Rome was also important; while there he was invited by the Oratorian, Francisco Gomes do Avelar, who in 1789 had become Bishop of the Algarve, to go to Portugal and work in his diocese.

=== In Portugal ===
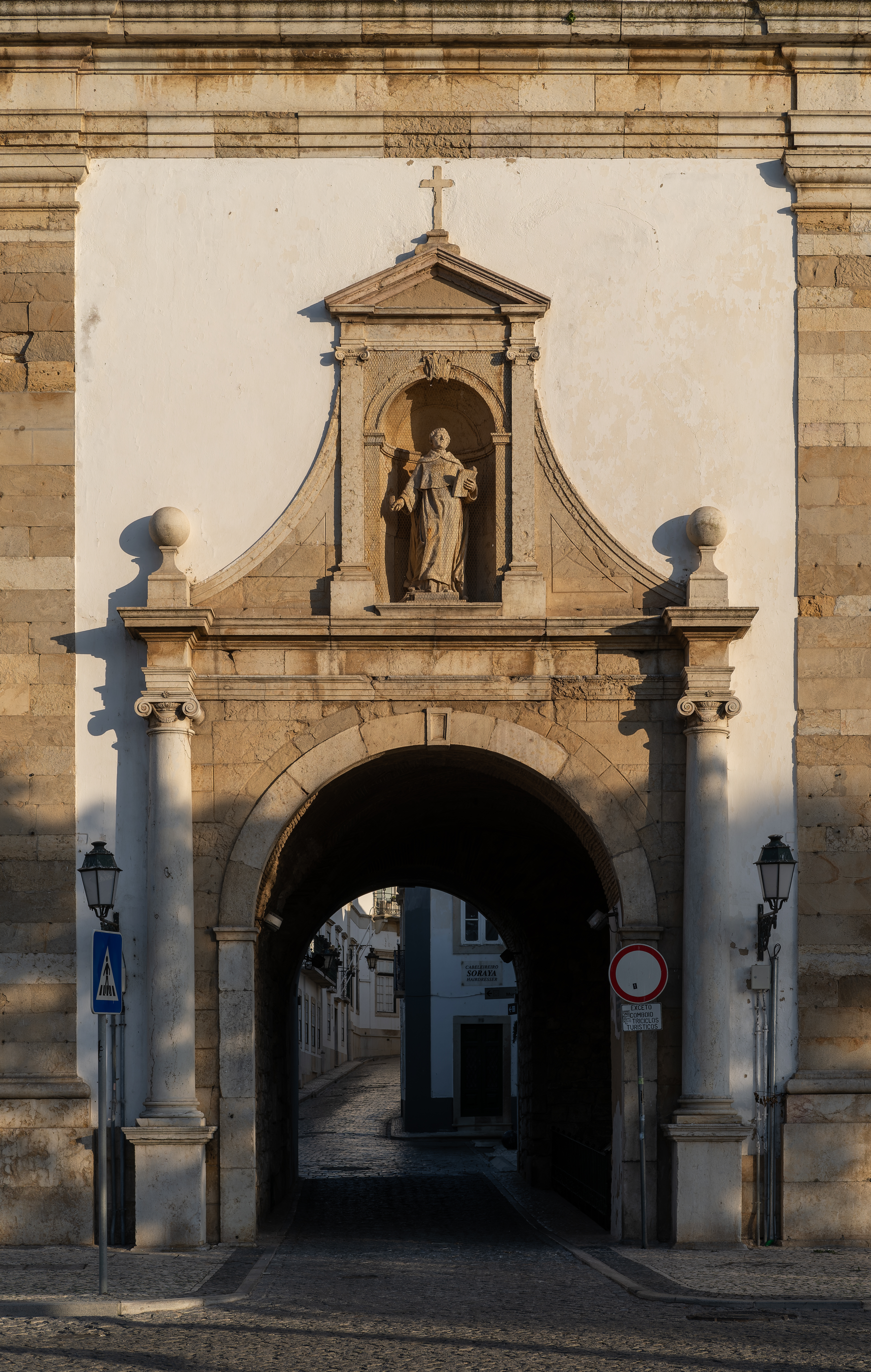
Arco da Vila, Faro

Fabri arrived in the Algarve in November 1790 and lived with his cultured and enlightened patron in the Episcopal Palace at Faro. There he designed a hospital and seminary and planned the reconstruction of many buildings that had been ruined or destroyed by the 1755 Lisbon earthquake. Fabri also built the city arch, the Arco da Vila (c. 1792), at one end of the old harbour, where he framed the original gate with a majestic double architectural composition. The arch itself is framed by two Ionic columns and crowned by a niche with a triangular pediment in which stands a fine Italian statue of Thomas Aquinas. This composition is in turn framed by another, divided by four Tuscan pilasters and surmounted by a bell-tower, also with pediment and wings.

Adjoining the triumphal arch, Fabri built the new hospital incorporating the 16th-century Misericórdia Church, to which he added a façade with a triangular pediment, and at one side of this a Tuscan arcade open to the Ria (all 1790–94). The plan of the hospital interior was new to the region of the Algarve and showed a knowledge of Italian hospital planning as well as Fabri's ability to adapt to local conditions, such as using false ceilings made of cane for coolness. The seminary (1790–94) is a functional and utilitarian building that nevertheless enhances the fine urban space of the cathedral square (Largo da Sé) that it faces. Here Fabri gave continuity to the existing buildings by using the same scale and a simplified arrangement of openings, and he completed the new construction with a refectory of fine proportions, using a neoclassical façade that maintains the dignified simplicity of a large wing of the cathedral square.

Fabri rebuilt the church of Santa Maria do Castelo at Tavira, which had been virtually destroyed in 1755. He strengthened the outer walls and was able to retain the earlier ogival doorway and the Gothic, Manueline and Renaissance side chapels. He gave a strong Palladian feeling to the new interior as well as to the façade, the central section of which is framed by Tuscan pilasters and surmounted by a pediment bearing urns. He appreciated the qualities of simplicity, proportion and rhythm, often emphasized by the use of whitewash, that were characteristic of the local architecture. He often restricted himself to strengthening pre-existing structures, as at Cacela, or remodelling earlier structures while at the same time retaining their essential feeling, as at Tavira and as is seen in the bold integration of the Manueline church at Alcantarilha. Elsewhere he retained or restored 16th-century buildings and only made additions, as at São Brás de Alportel, or remodelled the capitals with a new Ionic design, as at Estoi, Algarve. For the church at Aljezur, however, which has a Greek-cross plan, he made new designs.

=== Lisbon ===
In 1794 Fabri went to Lisbon, and through Bishop Gomes do Avelar he was patronized by the court and nobility. He designed the palace of the Marquês de Castelo Melhor (c. 1795), remodelled in the 19th century by the Marquêses de Foz, by whose name it is now known. He designed the Hospital Real da Marinha (Royal Naval Hospital, 1797) and the mausoleum of Christian August, Prince of Waldeck and Pyrmont), inspired by Giovanni Battista Piranesi. Fabri was appointed Architect of Public Works (Arquitecto das Obras Publicas), and the design of the severe neoclassical monument to Maria I of Portugal (1797; now Palace of Queluz) executed by João José de Aguiar has been attributed to Fabri.

The eastern façade (and main entrance) to the Palácio Nacional da Ajuda

His last work was the important new Palace of Ajuda, Lisbon, begun 1802, on which he worked with José da Costa e Silva, who had made the plans. They replaced the Baroque architect, Manuel Caetano de Sousa, who had previously been in charge of building at court. A more monumental programme was envisaged at Ajuda, which is strongly influenced by Luigi Vanvitelli's design for the Royal Palace of Caserta, and incorporates ideas from the rebuilding of Lisbon in Pombaline style, seen at its most palatial form in the Praça do Comércio. The great central pavilion at Ajuda has an arcade that echoes the Villa Albani in Rome and a vista through a courtyard that evokes the engravings of Piranesi. The formal qualities and great dignity of the Palace express political values in Portugal at the beginning of the 19th century, and Ajuda is considered the finest example of neoclassical architecture in the country. Fabri died in Lisbon on 23 October 1817.

== Gallery ==
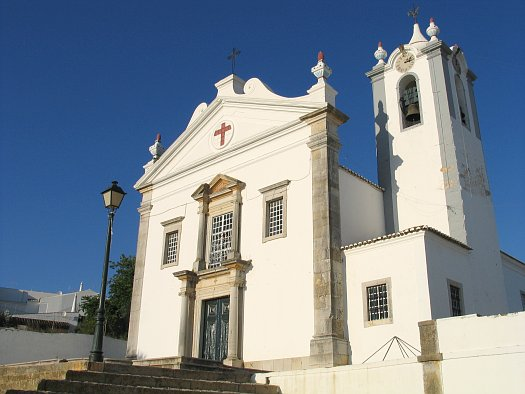
Church of Estoi

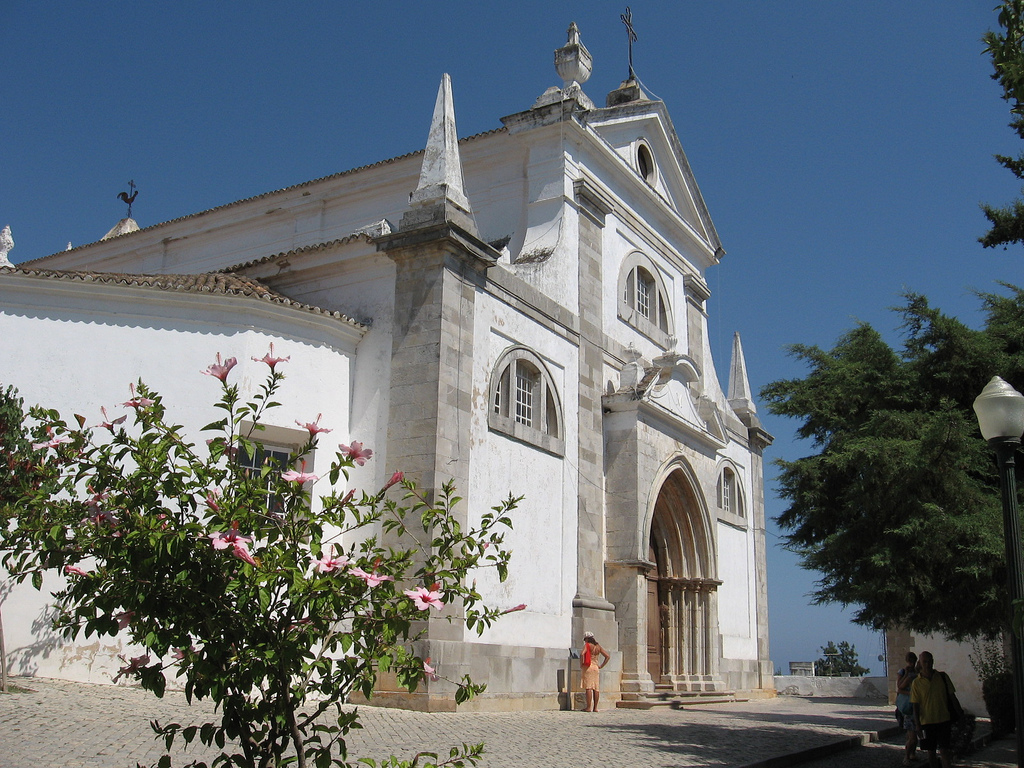
Church of Tavira

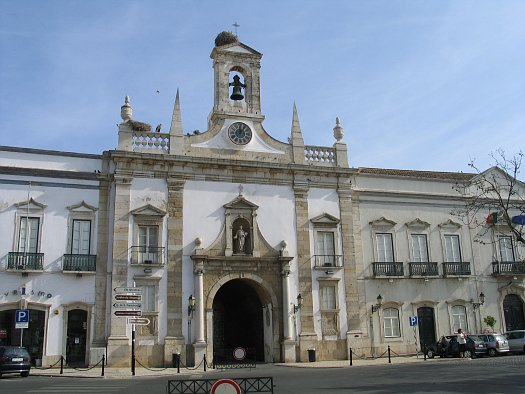
Arco da Vila, Faro

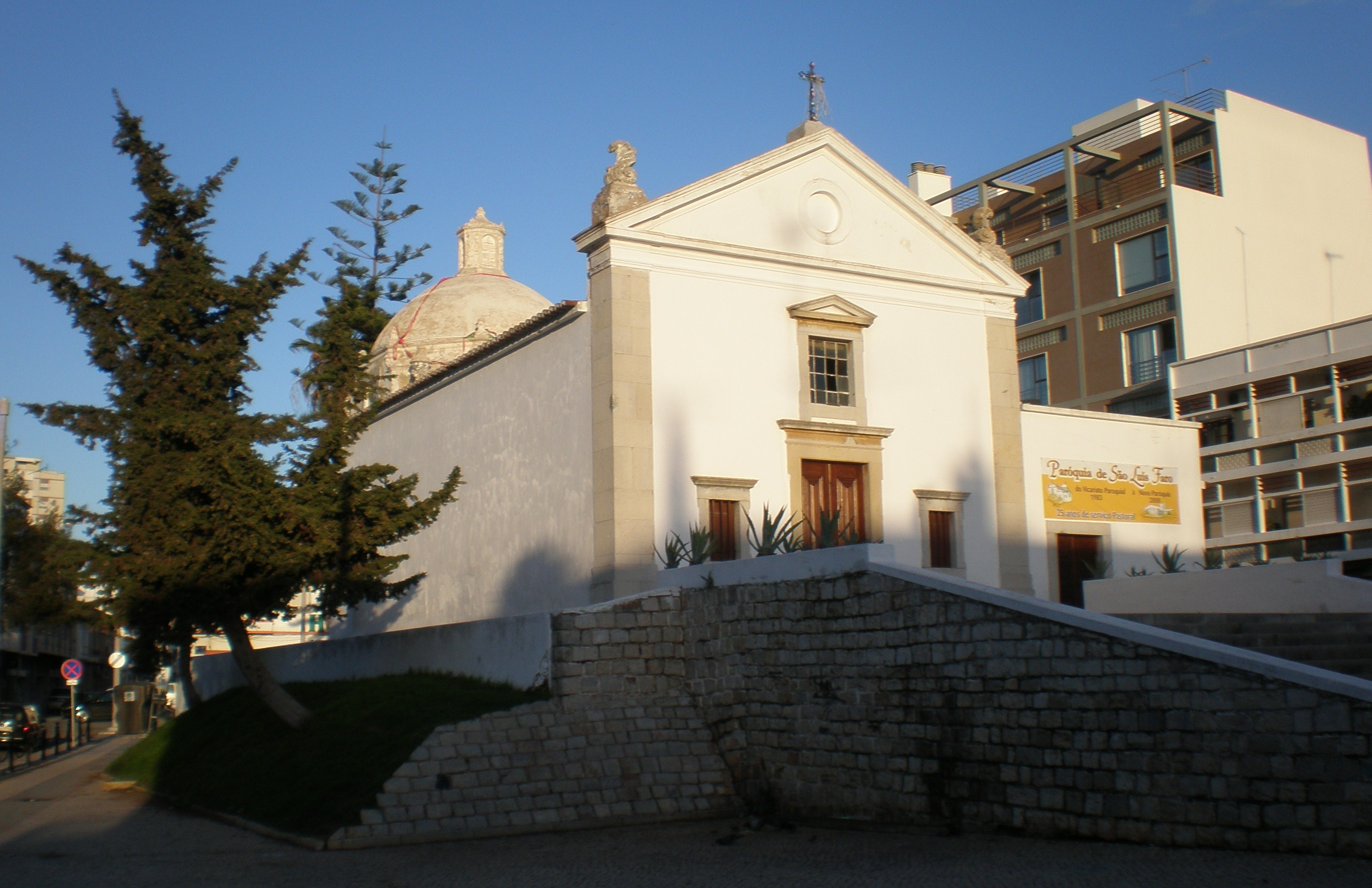
Capel of St. Luis, Faro

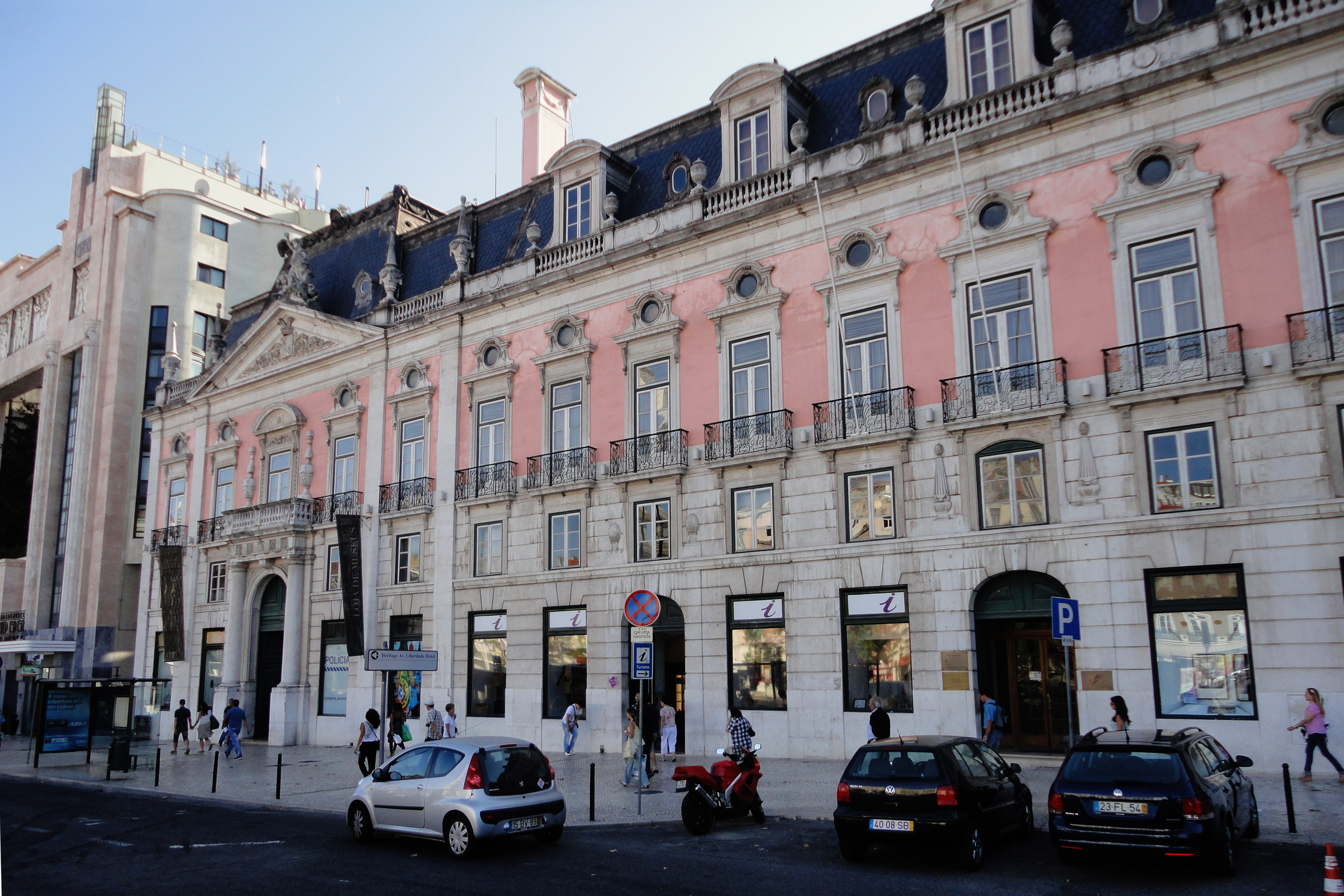
Palácio Foz, Lisbon

== Bibliography ==
- Carvalho, A. Ayres de (1979). Os três arquitectos da Ajuda [Three architects of Ajuda]. Lisbon: Academia Nacional de Belas-Artes.
- Fernandes, José Manuel (2009). "Fabri, Francesco Saverio (or Francisco Xavier)". The Oxford Companion to Architecture. Oxford University Press.
- França, José-Augusto (1966). A arte em Portugal no século XIX [Art in Portugal in the 19th century]. Vol. 1. Lisbon: Livraria Bertrand.
- Rimondini, Giovanni; Samoggia, Luigi (1979). Francesco Saverio Fabri, architetto. Medicina: Centro Ricerche storiche medicinesi.
- Samoggia, Luigi (1993). "Fabri, Francesco Saverio". Dizionario Biografico degli Italiani (in Italian). Vol. 43: Enzo–Fabrizi. Rome: Istituto dell'Enciclopedia Italiana. ISBN 978-88-12-00032-6.
- Santos, Marco Sousa (2018). "O Arco da Vila: expoente da arquitetura neoclássica no Algarve". Anais do Município de Faro. XL: 185–205 – via Academia.edu.
