= Frances K. Graham =

American psychologist

- Born: August 1, 1918
- Died: April 16, 2013 (aged 94–95)
- Occupation: Psychologist

Born out of Canastota, New York, Frances K. Graham (August 1, 1918 – April 16, 2013) was an American psychologist and Professor of Psychology at the University of Delaware, where she was elected to the National Academy of Sciences in 1988.

== Career ==
Graham's studies focused on child and developmental psychology. While little is known about Graham's early life, she graduated with a Ph.D. in psychology from Yale University in 1942. After graduating from Yale, Graham went on to work at Washington University where she studied anoxia in newborns. She continued her research at the University of Wisconsin–Madison, and in 1986 she became a professor at the University of Delaware.

Graham served as president of the Society for Psychophysiological Research, president of the Society for Research in Child Development, president of the American Psychological Association Division of Comparative and Physiological Psychology, chair of the American Association for the Advancement of Science Section on Psychology, and chair of the NIMH Board of Scientific Counselors. She was elected to the National Academy of Sciences in 1988.

== Honors and awards ==
- Australian Psychological Society (APS) William James Fellow Award
- American Psychological Association (APA) G. Stanley Hall Award for Distinguished Contribution to Developmental Psychology award
- American Psychological Foundation Gold Medal Award for Life Achievement in Psychological Science
- Society for Psychophysiological Research Distinguished Contributions to Psychophysiology Award
- Society for Research in Child Development Distinguished Scientific Contribution Award
- APA Award for Distinguished Scientific Contributions (1990)

== Selected works ==
- Behavioral Differences Between Normal and Traumatized Newborns: II: Standardization, Reliability, and Validity" (1956)
- "The relationship of paranatal experience to oxygen saturation in newborn infants" (1957)
- "Brain injury in the preschool child: Some developmental considerations: I. Performance of normal children." (1963)
- "Brain injury in the preschool child: Some developmental considerations: II. Comparison of brain injured and normal children" (1963)
- "Habituation of Heart Rate Response to Repeated Auditory Stimulation during the First Five Days of Life" (1968)
- "The More or Less Startling Effects of Weak Prestimulation" (1975)
- "Prestimulation effects on blink and cardiac reflexes of 15-month human infants" (1989)
