= Albert Poffenberger =

American psychologist (1885–1977)

- Born: Albert Theodore Poffenberger; October 23, 1885; Dauphin, Pennsylvania, US
- Died: December 24, 1977 (aged 92); Livingston, New York, US
- Children: 2
- Scientific career
- Fields: Psychology
- Institutions: Columbia University

Albert "Poff" Theodore Poffenberger (October 23, 1885 – December 24, 1977) was an American psychologist who served as president of the American Psychological Association.

== Early life and education ==
Poffenberger was born on October 23, 1885, in Dauphin, Pennsylvania, the third of four children to Albert Theodore Sr. and Lillie J. Poffenberger. He graduated from Harrisburg High School, and attended Bucknell University. There, he received the Herbert Tustin Prize, as well as being an accomplished member of fraternities Phi Beta Kappa and Phi Kappa Psi, and played for the basketball team. He received an undergraduate Bachelor of Arts, summa cum laude, in 1908, and attended Columbia University for his doctorate. He later received an honorary Doctor of Science.

== Career and later life ==
After graduating, Poffenberger worked as a psychology lecturer for Columbia University. During World War I, he and his former professor Harry L. Hollingworth developed psychological tests for soldiers. In 1917, he married Flossie Kauffman, having 2 children together. In 1934 or 1935, he became president of the American Psychological Association, later simultaneously serving as the president of the Social Science Research Council. He authored and edited many scientific papers and textbooks throughout his career. He retired as an emeritus in 1950, moving to a farm in Montrose, New York. He died on December 24, 1977, aged 92, in a nursing home in Livingston, New York.
