= Ernst Fabri =

Austrian writer and journalist

Ernst Fabri (May 7, 1891 – November 6, 1966) was an Austrian writer and journalist.

== Biography ==
Born in Vienna, Austria-Hungary on 7 May 1891, Ernst Fabri joined the Austrian Social Democratic movement in 1906. A member of the radical wing of the Social Democrats during World War I, Fabri became a founding member of the Austrian Communist Party and founded the Union of Proletarian Writers in 1930.

The Fabri family moved to the Soviet Union in 1932, where Ernst Fabri edited a German-language newspaper in Moscow. Fabri was held in detention for fourteen days during the Great Purge in 1938, but was subsequently released from custody. Evacuated to Tashkent after the German invasion of the Soviet Union, he worked for the Austrian service of Radio Moscow in the post-war years, contributing German-language radio reports, sketches, and plays.

He died in Moscow on 6 November 1966.

Ernst Fabri's son, zoologist and animal behaviorist Kurt Fabri, was a professor of psychology at Moscow State University.
