= Frances Fabri =

Frances Fabri (née Sárika Ladányi; 22 September 1929 – 9 January 2006), was a Hungarian-born author and Holocaust survivor. She was born in Békés, Hungary.

== Life ==
At the age of fourteen, she was deported to Auschwitz with her family. Only Fabri and her mother survived. After their liberation they returned to their hometown. They left in 1956, and moved to New York, where Fabri graduated from Hofstra University in history and literature. She married Emery Fabri in Hungary, but the couple later divorced. She moved to San Francisco in about 1972. With the help of college students she started interviewing Holocaust survivors, which she collected in a book called Crickets Would Sing.

After her death in January 2006 in San Francisco, Dr. Matthew McKay established the Fabri Literary Prize in her honor.

== Sources ==
- The Fabri Literary Prize (in English)
- Wall, Alexandra J. (2006-01-20). "Auschwitz survivor Frances Fabri dies at 76". J. JWeekly.
- New Harbinger Publications: Frances Fabri (in English)
