= New Harbinger Publications =

American publisher

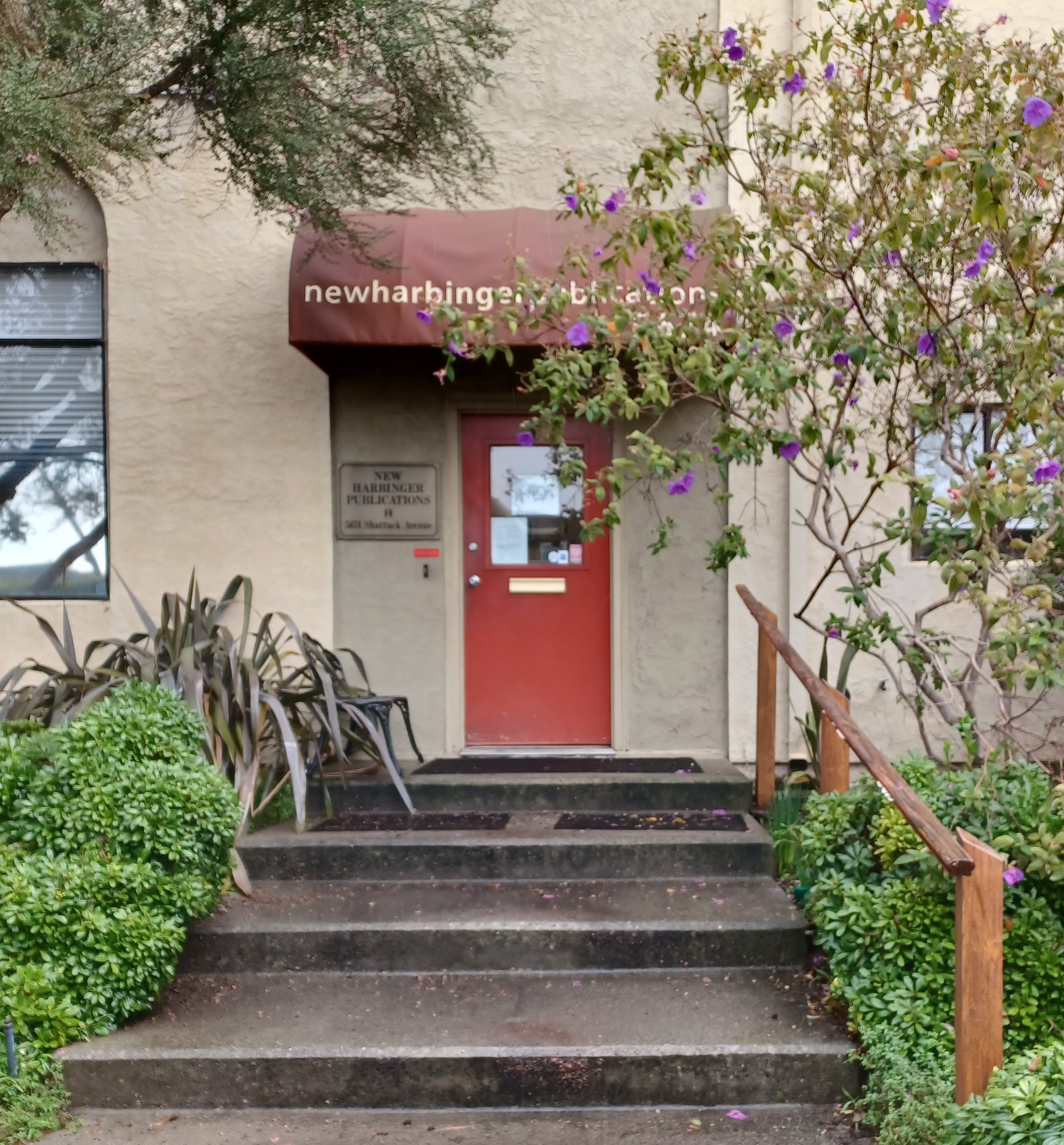
- Founded: 1973
- Founder: Matthew McKay, Ph.D. and Patrick Fanning
- Country of origin: United States
- Headquarters location: Oakland, California
- Distribution: self-distributed (US); SG Distributors (South Africa); Bookreps NZ (New Zealand); Raincoast Books (Canada); Little, Brown Book Group (UK); John Reed Book Distributors (Australia)
- Publication types: Books, CDs, DVDs, E-books
- Revenue: $15,000,000 (2013)
- No. of employees: 50 (2013)
- Official website: www.newharbinger.com

New Harbinger Publications, Inc. is an employee-owned, Oakland-based American publisher of self-help books.

== Overview ==
This publisher of self-help books specializes in titles that offer step-by-step procedures for dealing with phobias, anxiety, anger, relationship conflict and a wide variety of depression-related psychological problems. Founders Matthew McKay and Patrick Fanning’s have co-authored a dozen titles which established the model for New Harbinger’s other books.

New Harbinger has annual sales of + $15 million and over 50 employees. In 2004 employees owned 53% of the stock.

New Harbinger markets its titles to therapists, psychiatrists, and physicians for use by their patients and clients.

The New Harbinger catalog contains more than 300 titles.

== History ==
The company was founded in 1973 by psychologist Matthew McKay and writer, Patrick Fanning. McKay received his PhD in clinical psychology from the California School of Professional Psychology, and specializes in the cognitive behavioral treatment of anxiety and depression. He lives and works in the greater San Francisco Bay Area. McKay has authored and coauthored numerous books in the New Harbinger catalog including The Relaxation and Stress Reduction Workbook, Self-Esteem, Thoughts and Feelings, When Anger Hurts, and ACT on Life Not on Anger. He has also penned two fiction novels, Us and The Wawona Hotel.

Pat Fanning retired in the year 2000 but as of 2018 is still on the New Harbinger board of directors.

In 2003, the company ended its long relationship with Publishers Group West and took on a sales force to distribute its own titles.

In 2007, the company announced:

1. a co-publishing agreement with the Institute of Noetic Sciences (IONS). New Harbinger and Noetic Books partnered to publish books that incorporate science and focus on global issues, consciousness, spiritual and psychological wellness.
2. distribute of books by Boaz Publishing Company.
3. establishment of the Fabri Literary Prize, which is awarded and published by Boaz Publishing.
4. acquisition of Context Press titles (Psychologist and professor Steven C. Hayes established Context Press).

In 2008, the company acquired Instant Help Books, publisher of workbooks for children, teens, and adults on topics such as depression, anxiety, and anger.

Also in 2008, this publisher began publishing e-books.

== Catalog ==
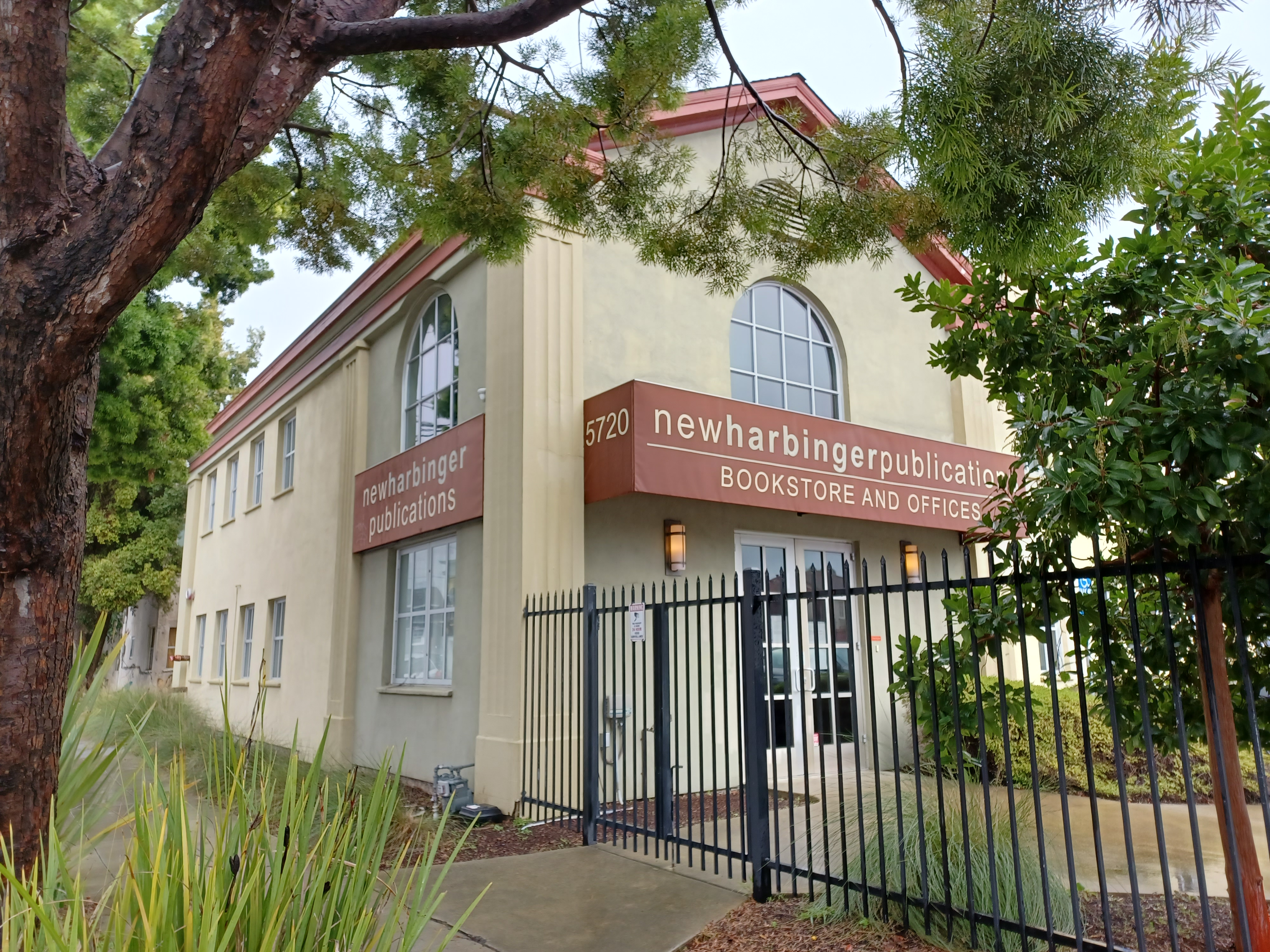
New Harbinger Publications bookstore and offices in Oakland

New Harbinger's books selling over one million copies are:

1. Michael Singer (2007). The Untethered Soul: The Journey Beyond Yourself. Oakland: New Harbinger/ Noetic Books. ISBN 978-1572245372
2. Susan Albers (2009). 50 Ways to Soothe Yourself Without Food. Oakland: New Harbinger. ISBN 978-1572246768
3. Bob Stahl & Elisha Goldstein (2010). A Mindfulness-Based Stress Reduction Workbook. Oakland: New Harbinger Publications; Pap/MP3. ISBN 978-1572247086
4. Nancy Mohrbacher & Kathleen Kendall-Tackett (2010). Breastfeeding Made Simple: Seven Natural Laws for Nursing Mothers. Oakland: New Harbinger. ISBN 978-1572248618
5. Matthew McKay, Elizabeth Robbins Eshelman & Martha Davis (2008 6th ed.). The Relaxation & Stress Reduction Workbook. Oakland: New Harbinger. ISBN 978-1572245495

Many of New Harbinger's psychology books focus on the areas of ACT, CBT, and DBT. New Harbinger is a leading publisher in the area of Acceptance and Commitment Therapy (ACT). It has published 26 ACT titles, including several by Hayes, who co-founded ACT and is one of its leading theorists.

New Harbinger also publishes a number of books that use the psychological concentrations of cognitive behavioral therapy (CBT) and Dialectical Behavioral Therapy (DBT).

The New Harbinger catalog contains more than 300 titles in the areas of:

1. Psychological self-help: anxiety, depression, ADD/ADHD, Autism, Asperger’s, addiction and recovery, agoraphobia, anger management, bipolar and cyclothymia, borderline personality disorder, dissociative identity disorder, eating and body image disorders, grief recovery, impulse-control problems, OCD, perfectionism, self esteem, stress, trauma and psychological abuse.
2. Health & wellness: Alzheimer’s, cancer, cardiac health, diet and exercise, digestive and urinary problems, disease prevention, fibromyalgia and chronic illness, medications, Parkinson’s, pain control, perimenopause and menopause, whole body healing.
3. Family and relationship: aging, alternative families, special needs, divorce, intimate relationships, parenting skills, pregnancy and childcare, human sexuality, weddings and marriage.
4. Personal growth: career and business, communication skills, focus and memory, spirituality and philosophy, transformation.
