= Johann Ernst Fabri =

German geographer and statistician

Johann Ernst Fabri (16 July 1755 – 30 May 1825) was a German geographer and statistician.

Fabri was born in Oels, Silesia. In 1776, he began his studies in theology at the University of Halle, but his focus soon turned to geography and history. Later, he served as privat-docent at the University of Göttingen, where he was influenced by distinguished scholars that included Johann Christoph Gatterer, August Ludwig von Schlözer and Johann Friedrich Blumenbach.

In 1786, he moved to Jena as an associate professor of geography and statistics and, in 1794, became a professor at the University of Erlangen. For much of his career, Fabri received no pay for his lectures; only in 1815 did he begin to receive a fixed salary. He died in Erlangen.

== Selected publications ==
- Elementargeographie (Elementary geography), Halle 1780–90, 4 volumes.
- Handbuch der neuesten Geographie für Akademien und Gymnasien (Textbook of the latest geography for academics and gymnasium), Halle 1784–85.
- Verzeichniss von aeltern und neuern Land- und Reisebeschreibungen, 1784 (with Gottlieb Heinrich Stuck).
- Abriß der Geographie für Schulen, (Outline of geography), 1785.
- Geographisches Magazin (Geographic magazine), Dessau and Leipzig 1783–85, 4 volumes.
- Neues geographisches Magazin (New geographic magazine), 1785–87.
- Geographie für alle Stände (Geography for all status groups), 1786–1808, 5 volumes.
- Magazin für die Geographie (Magazine for geography), Nürnberg 1797, 3 volumes.
- Abriß der natürlichen Erdkunde (Outline of natural geography), 1800.
- Encyklopädie der historischen Hauptwissenschaften und Hülfsdoctrinen (Encyclopedia of historical sciences and their auxiliary doctrines), 1808.
