= Marta Kutas =

American psychologist

- Born: September 2, 1949 (age 77); Hungary
- Known for: Discovery of the N400
- Awards: 2023- Revelle Medal Award, University of California, San Diego 2015- Cognitive Neuroscience Society, Distinguished Career Contributions Award 2007- Award for Distinguished Contributions to Psychophysiology
- Website: http://kutaslab.ucsd.edu/index.html

Marta Kutas (born September 2, 1949) is a Professor and Chair of cognitive science and an adjunct professor of neuroscience at the University of California, San Diego. She also directs the Center for Research in Language at UCSD. Kutas is known for discovering the N400, an event-related potential (ERP) component typically elicited by unexpected linguistic stimuli, with her colleague Steven Hillyard in one of the first studies in what is now the field of neurolinguistics.

== Education and career ==
Kutas received a Bachelor of Arts in 1971 from Oberlin College and a Master of Arts and Ph.D. (1977) in Biological Psychology from the University of Illinois Urbana-Champaign, and she completed a postdoctoral fellowship at the University of California, San Diego in 1980. She then accepted a position as a research neuroscientist in the Department of Neurosciences at University of California, San Diego, and she has been a member of the Department of Cognitive Science at University of California, San Diego since its founding in 1988. In 2018, Kutas was elected to the American Academy of Arts and Sciences.

== Research ==
Kutas' research interests are focused in language comprehension/production, specifically how meaning (from all sorts of sensory inputs) is organized, accessed, and constructed. Kutas examines these cognitive processes in both healthy and clinical populations throughout the adult lifespan. Her principle technique used to study these cognitive processes in electroencephalography and ERPs.

== Awards and honors ==
- 2023- Revelle Medal Award, University of California, San Diego
- 2015- Cognitive Neuroscience Society, Distinguished Career Contributions Award
- 2007- Award for Distinguished Contributions to Psychophysiology
