= Psychophysiology =

Branch of psychology

Psychophysiology (from Greek ψῡχή, psȳkhē, "breath, life, soul"; φύσις, physis, "nature, origin"; and -λογία, -logia) is the branch of psychology that is concerned with the physiological bases of psychological processes. While psychophysiology was a general, broad field of research in the 1960s and 1970s, it has now become quite specialized, based on methods, topic of studies, and scientific traditions. Methods vary as combinations of electrophysiological methods (such as EEG), neuroimaging (MRI, PET), and neurochemistry. Topics have branched into subspecializations such as social, sport, cognitive, cardiovascular, clinical, and other branches of psychophysiology.

== Background ==
Some people have difficulty distinguishing a psychophysiologist from a physiological psychologist, which has two very different perspectives. Psychologists are interested in why we may fear spiders and physiologists may be interested in the input/output system of the amygdala. A psychophysiologist will attempt to link the two. Psychophysiologists generally study the psychological/physiological link in intact human subjects. While early psychophysiologists almost always examined the impact of psychological states on physiological system responses, since the 1970s, psychophysiologists have also frequently studied the impact of physiological states and systems on psychological states and processes. It is this perspective of studying the interface of mind and body that makes psychophysiologists most distinct.

Historically, most psychophysiologists tended to examine the physiological responses and organ systems innervated by the autonomic nervous system. More recently, psychophysiologists have been equally, or potentially more, interested in the central nervous system, exploring brain potentials such as the many types of event-related potentials (ERPs), brain waves, and utilizing advanced technology such as functional magnetic resonance imaging (fMRI), MRI, PET, MEG, and other neuroimagery techniques.

A psychophysiologist may look at how exposure to a stressful situation will produce a result in the cardiovascular system such as a change in heart rate (HR), vasodilation/vasoconstriction, myocardial contractility, or stroke volume. Overlaps in areas of interest between psychophysiologists and physiological psychologist may consist of observing how one cardiovascular event may influence another cardiovascular or endocrine event; or how activation of one neural brain structure exerts excitatory activity in another neural structure which then induces an inhibitory effect in some other system. Often, physiological psychologists examine the effects that they study in infrahuman subjects using surgical or invasive techniques and processes.

Psychophysiology is closely related to the field of neuroscience, which primarily concerns itself with relationships between psychological events and brain processes. Psychophysiology is also related to the medical disciplines, such as endocrinology, psychosomatic, and psychopharmacology.

While psychophysiology was a discipline off the mainstream of psychological and medical science prior to roughly the 1940s, more recently, psychophysiology has found itself positioned at the intersection of psychological and medical science, and its popularity and importance have expanded commensurately with the realization of the inter-relatedness of mind and body.

== Measures ==
Psychophysiology measures exist in multiple domains; reports, electrophysiological studies, studies in neurochemistry, neuroimaging, and behavioral methods. Evaluative reports involve participant introspection and self-ratings of internal psychological states or physiological sensations, such as self-report of arousal levels on the self-assessment manikin, or measures of interoceptive visceral awareness such as heartbeat detection. Merits to self-report are an emphasis on accurately understand the participants' subjective experience and understanding their perception; however, its pitfalls include the possibility of participants misunderstanding a scale or incorrectly recalling events.

Physiological responses also can be measured via instruments that read bodily events such as heart rate change, electrodermal activity (EDA), muscle tension, and cardiac output. Many indices are part of modern psychophysiology, including brain waves (electroencephalography, EEG), fMRI (functional magnetic resonance imaging), electrodermal activity (a standardized term encompassing skin conductance response, SCR, and galvanic skin response, GSR), cardiovascular measures (heart rate, HR; beats per minute, BPM; heart rate variability, HRV; vasomotor activity), muscle activity (electromyography, EMG), electrogastrogram (EGG), changes in pupil diameter with thought, emotion, and perception (pupillometry), eye movements, recorded via the electro-oculogram (EOG) and direction-of-gaze methods, cardiodynamics, recorded via impedance cardiography, and grip force.

These measures are beneficial because they provide accurate and observer-independent objective data recorded by machinery. The downsides, however, are that any physical activity or motion can alter responses, and basal levels of arousal and responsiveness can differ among individuals and even between situations. Neurochemical methods are used to study functionality and processes associated to neurotransmitters and neuropeptides

Finally, one can measure overt action or behavior, which involves the observation and recording actual actions, such as running, freezing, eye movement, and facial expression. These are good response measures and easy to record in animals, but they are not as frequently used in human studies.

== Uses ==
Psychophysiological measures are often used to study emotion and attention responses to stimuli, during exertion, and increasingly, to better understand cognitive processes. Physiological sensors have been used to detect emotions in schools and intelligent tutoring systems.

== Emotions as example of psychophysiological studies ==
Psychophysiology studies multiple aspects of behavior, and emotions are the most common example. It has long been recognized that emotional episodes are partly constituted by physiological responses. Early work done linking emotions to psychophysiology started with research on mapping consistent autonomic nervous system (ANS) responses to discrete emotional states. For example, anger might be constituted by a certain set of physiological responses, such as increased cardiac output and high diastolic blood pressure, which would allow us to better understand patterns and predict emotional responses.

Some studies were able to detect consistent patterns of ANS responses that corresponded to specific emotions under certain contexts. An early study by Paul Ekman and colleagues in 1983 found that "Emotion-specific activity in the autonomic nervous system was generated by constructing facial prototypes of emotion muscle by muscle and by reliving past emotional experiences. The autonomic activity produced distinguished not only between positive and negative emotions, but also among negative emotions". However, as more studies were conducted, more variability was found in ANS responses to discrete emotion inductions, not only among individuals but also over time in the same individuals, and greatly between social groups.

Some of these differences can be attributed to variables like induction technique, context of the study, or classification of stimuli, which can alter a perceived scenario or emotional response. However, it was also found that features of the participant could also alter ANS responses. Factors such as basal level of arousal at the time of experimentation or between-test recovery, learned or conditioned responses to certain stimuli, range and maximal level of effect of ANS action, and individual attentiveness can all alter physiological responses in a lab setting.

Even supposedly discrete emotional states fail to show specificity. For example, some emotional typologists consider fear to have subtypes, which might involve fleeing or freezing, both of which can have distinct physiological patterns and potentially distinct neural circuitry. As such no definitive correlation can be drawn linking specific autonomic patterns to discrete emotions, causing emotion theorists to rethink classical definitions of emotions.

== Psychophysiological inference and physiological computer games ==
Physiological computing represents a category of affective computing that incorporates real-time software adaption to the psychophysiological activity of the user. The main goal of this is to build a computer that responds to user emotion, cognition and motivation. The approach is to enable implicit and symmetrical human-computer communication by granting the software access to a representation of the user's psychological status.

There are several possible methods to represent the psychological state of the user (discussed in the affective computing page). The advantages of using psychophysiological indices are that their changes are continuous, measures are covert and implicit, and only available data source when the user interacts with the computer without any explicit communication or input device. These systems rely upon an assumption that the psychophysiological measure is an accurate one-to-one representation of a relevant psychological dimension, such as mental effort, task engagement, and frustration.

Physiological computing systems all contain an element that may be termed as an adaptive controller that may be used to represent the player. This adaptive controller represents the decision-making process underlying software adaptation. In their simplest form, adaptive controllers are expressed in Boolean statements. Adaptive controllers encompass not only the decision-making rules but also the psychophysiological inference that is implicit in the quantification of those trigger points used to activate the rules.

The representation of the player using an adaptive controller can become very complex and often only one-dimensional. The loop used to describe this process is known as the biocybernetic loop. The biocybernetic loop describes the closed-loop system that receives psychophysiological data from the player, transforms that data into a computerized response, which then shapes the future psychophysiological response from the player. A positive control loop tends towards instability as the player-software loop strives towards a higher standard of desirable performance. The physiological computer game may wish to incorporate both positive and negative loops into the adaptive controller.

== See also ==
- Karl U. Smith
- Vladimir Nebylitsyn
- Jemma King
- Physiological psychology
- Search activity concept
- Behavior change
