= List of developmental psychologists =

The following is a list of academics, both past and present, noted for their contributions to the field of developmental psychology.

== A ==
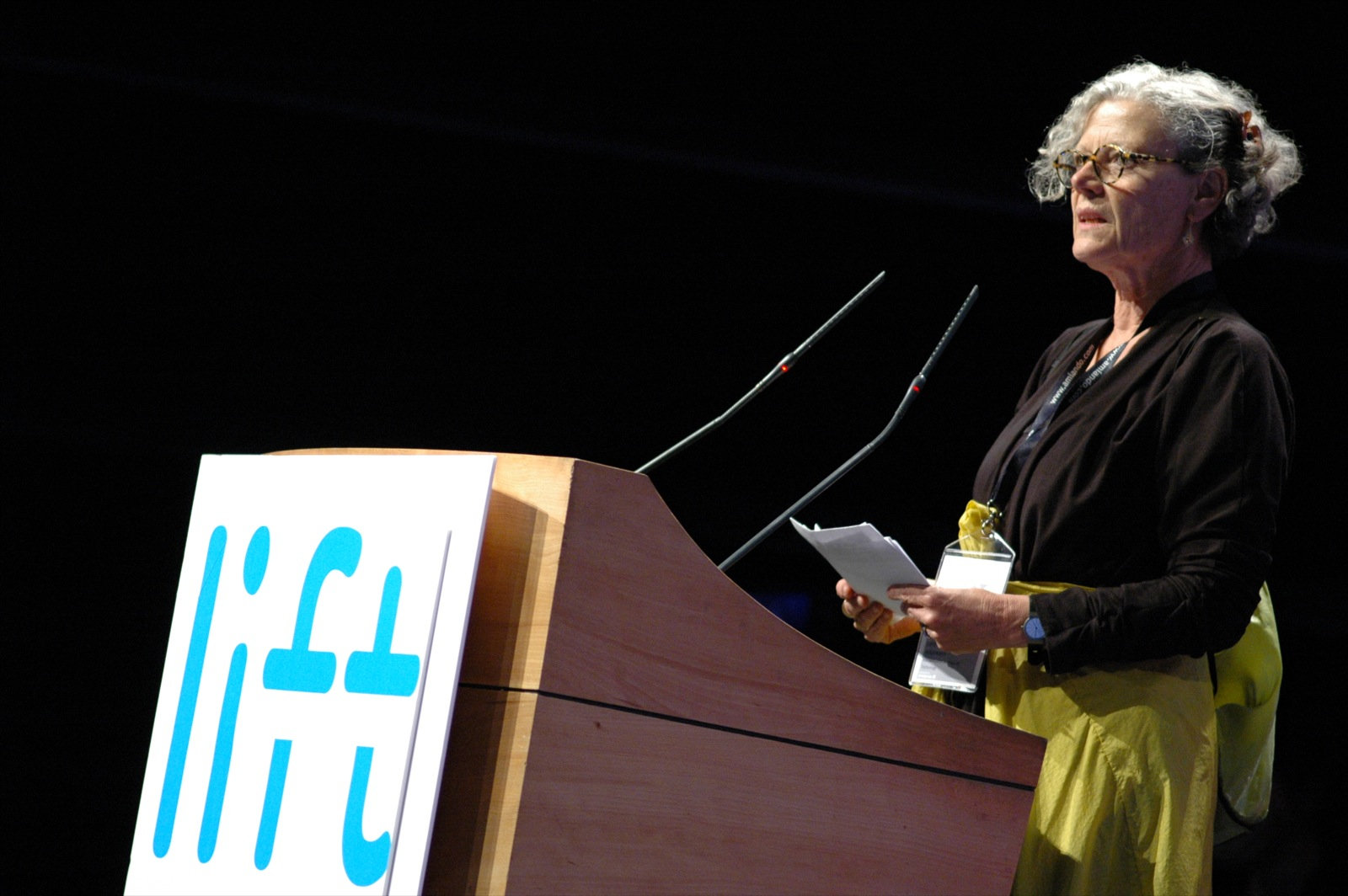
Swiss-born American psychologist Edith Ackermann

- Edith Ackermann (1946–2016)
- Lauren Adamson
- Mary Ainsworth (1913–1999)
- Martha W. Alibali
- Louise Bates Ames (1908–1906)
- Jeffrey Arnett
- Louise Arseneault

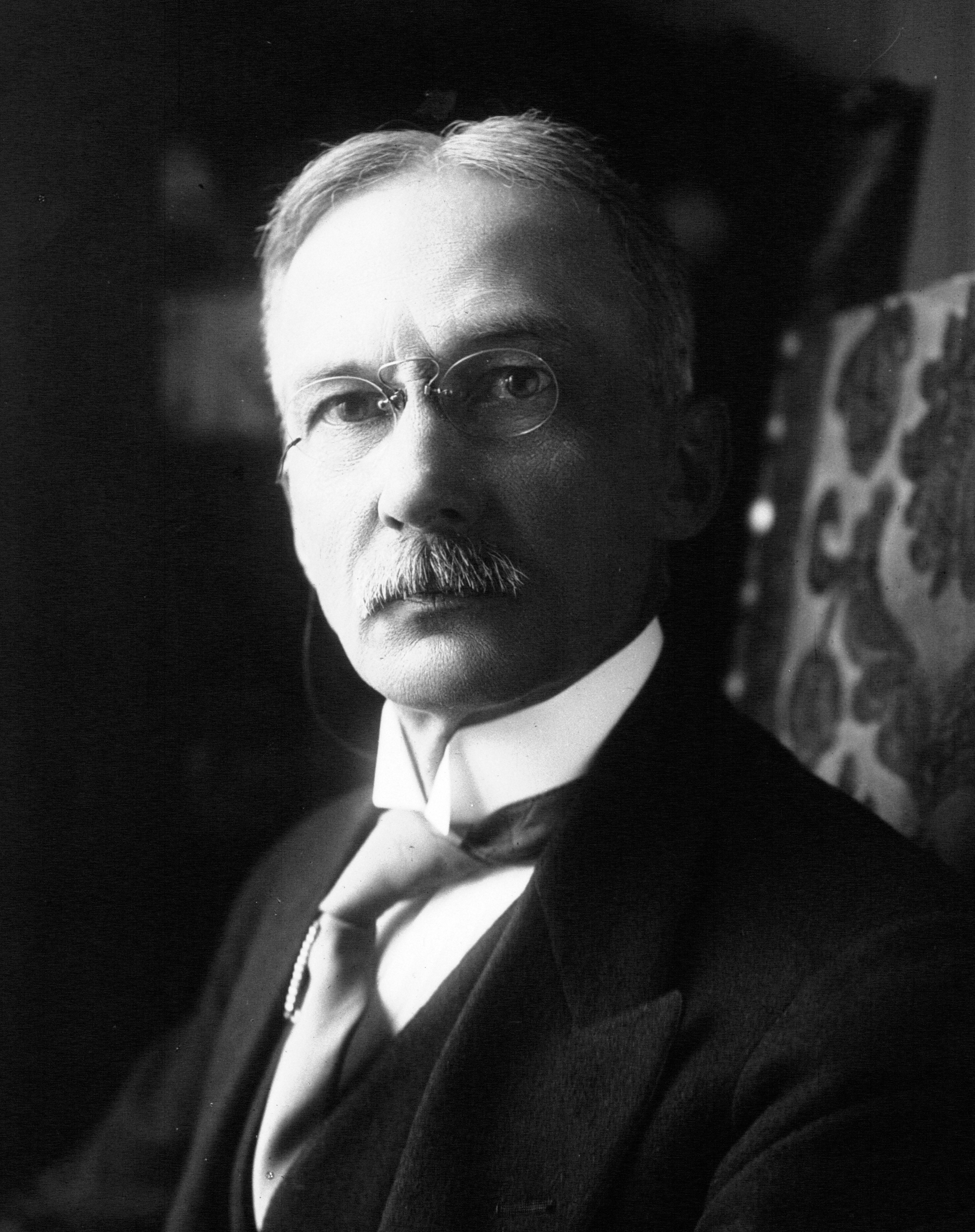
American psychologist James Mark Baldwin

== B ==
- Donald M. Baer (1931–2002)
- Albert Bandura (1925–2021)
- Renée Baillargeon
- James Mark Baldwin (1861–1934)
- Paul Baltes (1939–2006)
- Simon Baron-Cohen
- Rachel Barr
- Nancy Bayley (1899–1994)
- Diana Baumrind (1927–2018)
- Jay Belsky (1952–)
- Rebecca Bigler
- Sidney W. Bijou (1908–2009)
- Leann Birch (1946–2019)
- David F. Bjorklund
- Lois Bloom
- Marc H. Bornstein (1947–)
- John Bowlby (1907–1990)
- Gene Brody
- Urie Bronfenbrenner (1917–2005)
- Jeanne Brooks-Gunn (1946–)
- Christia Spears Brown
- Jerome Bruner (1915–2016)
- Charlotte Bühler
- Erica Burman

== C ==
- Deborah M. Capaldi
- Stephen J. Ceci
- Dante Cicchetti
- Edouard Claparède (1873–1940)
- Mamie Phipps Clark (1917–1983)
- Ann M. Clarke (1928–2015)
- K. Alison Clarke-Stewart (1943–2014)
- Cynthia García Coll
- Rand Conger
- Wendy Craig
- Nicki R. Crick (1958–2012)

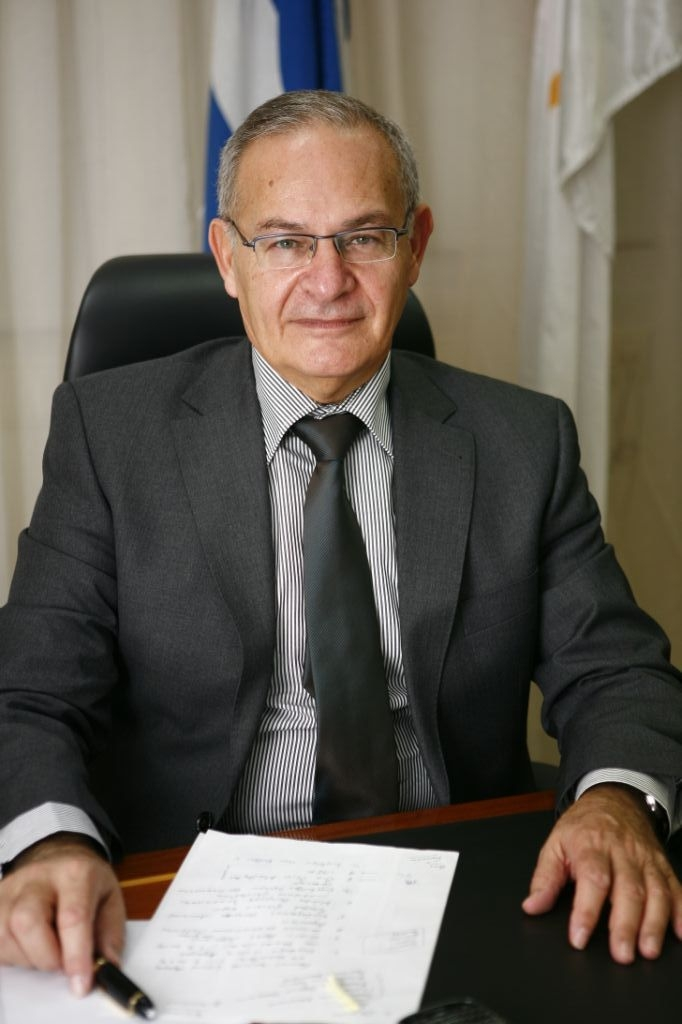
Greek Cypriot psychologist and former Minister of Education and Culture of Cyprus, Andreas Demetriou

== D ==
- Brian D'Onofrio
- Kazimierz Dąbrowski
- William Damon
- Kirby Deater-Deckard
- Andreas Demetriou
- Martin Deutsch
- Rheta DeVries
- Adele Diamond
- Kenneth A. Dodge
- Judith Dunn

== E ==
- Jacquelynne Eccles
- Bruce J. Ellis

== F ==
- Robert L. Fantz (1925–1981)
- Shirley Feldman
- Anne Fernald
- John H. Flavell (1928–)
- Robyn Fivush
- Nathan Fox
- Michael C. Frank
- Uta Frith (1941–)
- Hans G. Furth

== G ==
- Howard Gardner (1943–)
- Eleanor J. Gibson (1910–2002)
- H. Hill Goldsmith
- Roberta Michnick Golinkoff
- Florence Goodenough (1886–1959)
- Gail Goodman
- Alison Gopnik
- Thérèse Gouin-Décarie
- Clare W. Graves (1914–1986)
- Giordana Grossi

== H ==
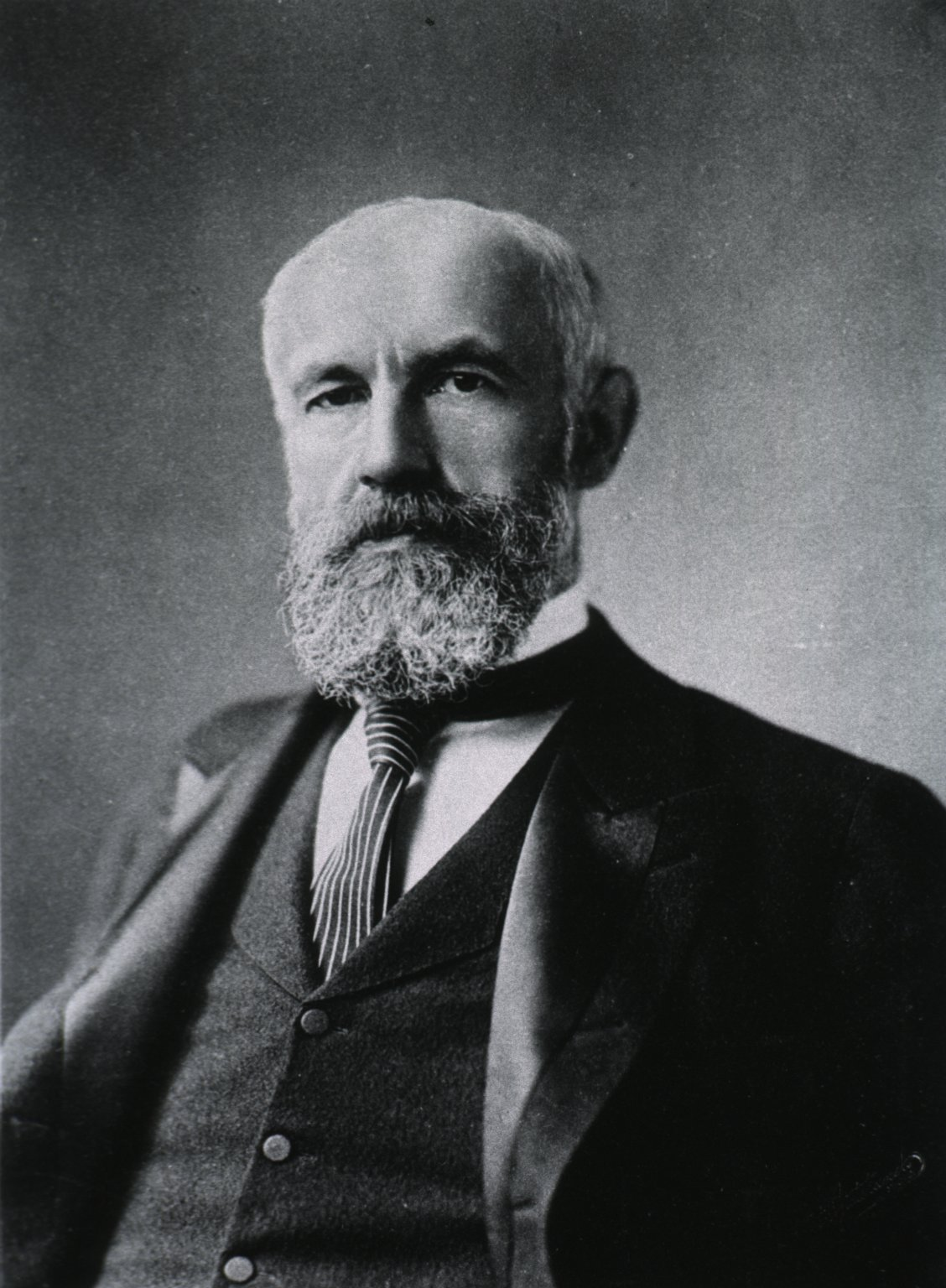
Psychologist G. Stanley Hall

- G. Stanley Hall (1844–1924)
- Glenna Halvorson-Boyd
- Margaret Kuenne Harlow (1918–1971)
- Isoko Hatano (1905–1978)
- Jutta Heckhausen
- E. Mavis Hetherington (1926–2023)
- Kathy Hirsh-Pasek
- George Holden
- Lois Holzman
- Frances Degen Horowitz (1932–2021)
- Ruth Winifred Howard (1900–1997)
- Aletha C. Huston

== I ==
- Bärbel Inhelder (1913–1997)
- Susan Sutherland Isaacs (1885–1948)
- Jana Iverson

== J ==
- Carol Nagy Jacklin

== K ==
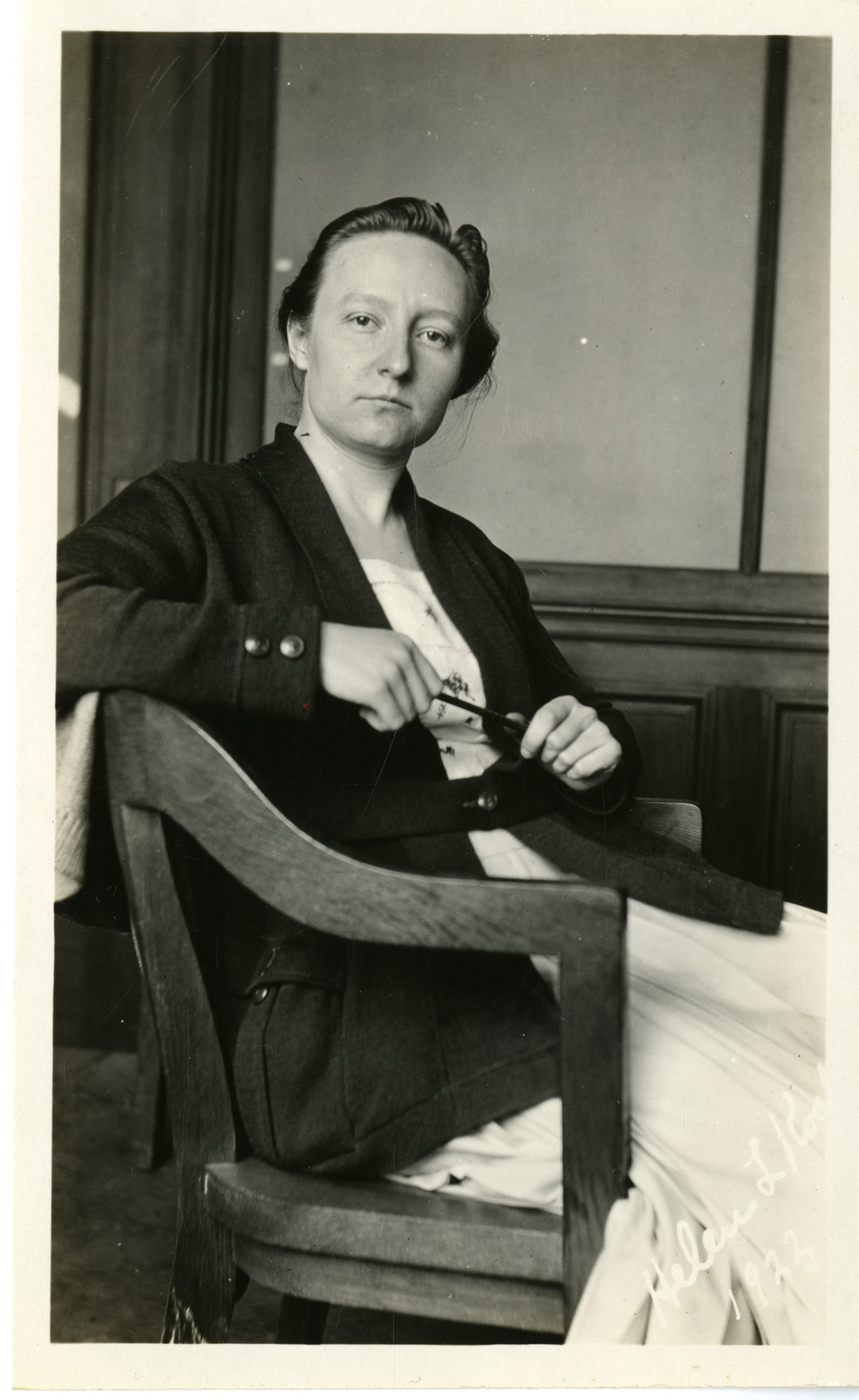
American psychologist Helen L. Koch

- Jerome Kagan
- Robert Kegan
- Melanie Killen
- Grazyna Kochanska
- Lawrence Kohlberg (1927–1987)
- Helen L. Koch (1895–1977)

== L ==
- Michael Lamb
- Lee C. Lee (1935–2006)
- Aleksei Leontiev (1903–1979)
- Richard M. Lerner (1946–)
- Daniel Levinson (1920–1994)
- Lynn S. Liben
- Jane Loevinger (1918–2008)
- Abraham Low (1891–1954)
- Margaret Lowenfeld (1890–1973)

== M ==
- Eleanor Maccoby (1917–2018)
- James Marcia
- Ann Masten
- Daphne Maurer
- Kathleen McCartney
- Vonnie McLoyd
- Andrew N. Meltzoff (1950–)
- Patricia H. Miller
- Paul H. Mussen

== N ==
- Katherine Nelson (1930–2018)
- John Nesselroade
- Erich Neumann
- Elissa L. Newport
- Anat Ninio
- Mary Louise Northway

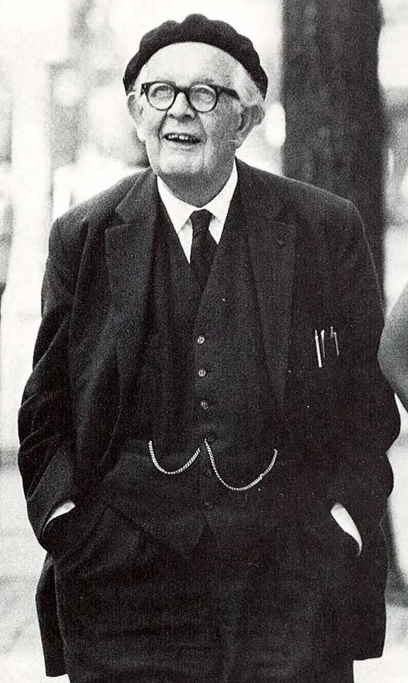
Swiss psychologist Jean Piaget

== O ==
- Jelena Obradovic
- Kristina Olson
- Joy Osofsky
- Willis Overton

== P ==
- Juan Pascual-Leone
- Anne C. Petersen (1944–)
- Jean Piaget (1896–1980)
- Debra Pepler
- James W. Prescott (1934–)

== R ==
- Marian Radke-Yarrow (1918–2007)
- Pamela Trotman Reid
- Harriet Lange Rheingold (1908–2000)
- Gina Rippon
- Mary K. Rothbart (1940–)
- Michael Rutter (1933–2021)

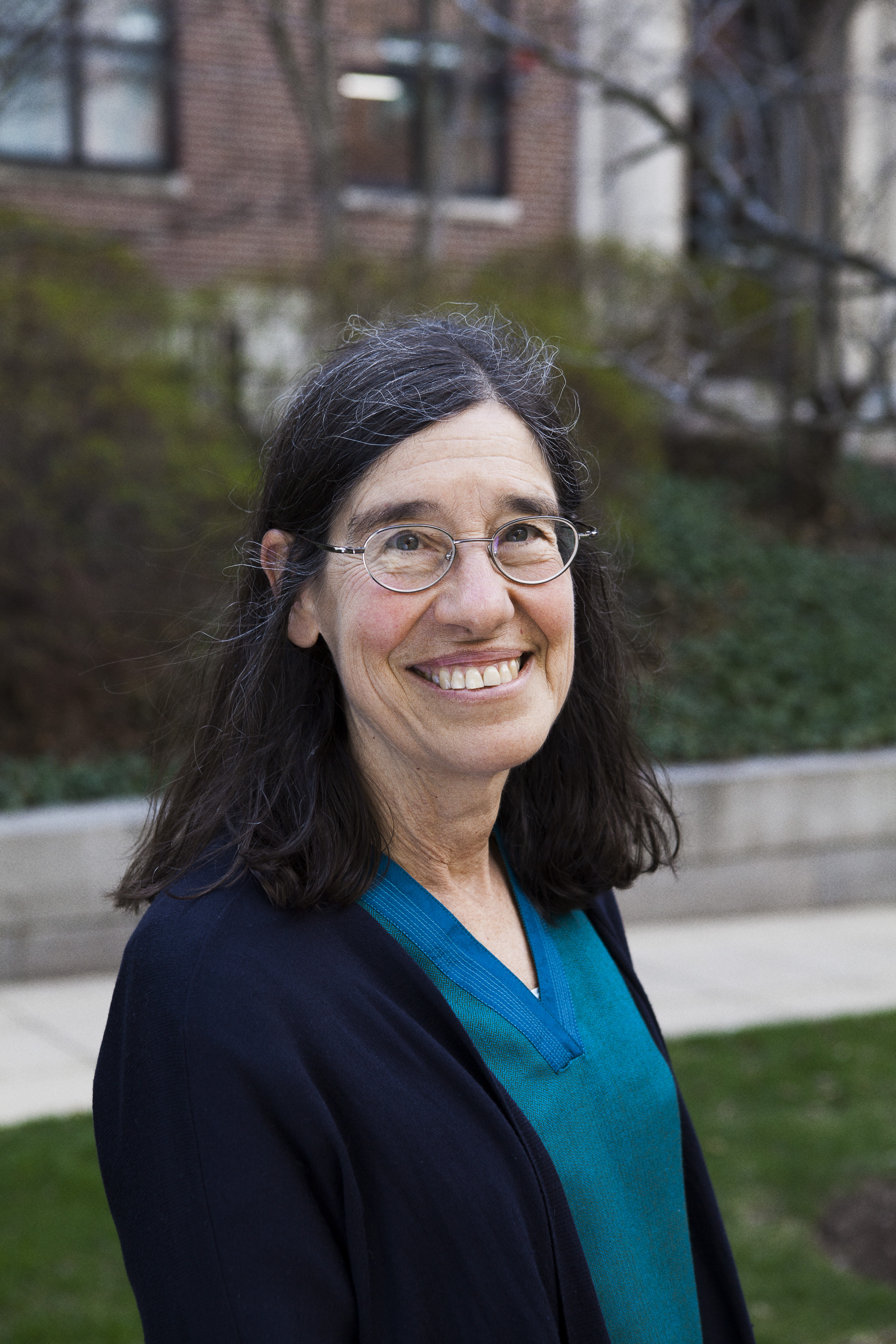
American psychologist Elizabeth Spelke

== S ==
- Carolyn Saarni (1945–2015)
- Jenny Saffran
- Arnold J. Sameroff
- K. Warner Schaie
- Núria Sebastián Gallés
- Michael Siegal
- Linda Siegel
- Robert S. Siegler
- Marian Sigman
- B. F. Skinner (1904–1990)
- Sara Smilansky (1922–2006)
- Linda B. Smith
- Peter K. Smith
- Andrea Smorti
- Catherine E. Snow
- Aletha Solter
- Edmund Sonuga-Barke
- Elizabeth Spelke
- Margaret Beale Spencer
- Laurence Steinberg (1952–)
- Clara Stern (1877–1945)
- Deborah Stipek
- Robert Stoller (1925–1991)

== T ==
- Ruby Takanishi
- Esther Thelen
- Barbara Tizard
- Deborah Tolman
- Michael Tomasello
- Carol Tomlinson-Keasey
- Edward Tronick
- Elliot Tucker-Drob
- Elliot Turiel (1938–)
- Gerald Turkewitz

== V ==
- Deborah Vandell
- Jaan Valsiner
- Lev Vygotsky (1896–1934)

== W ==
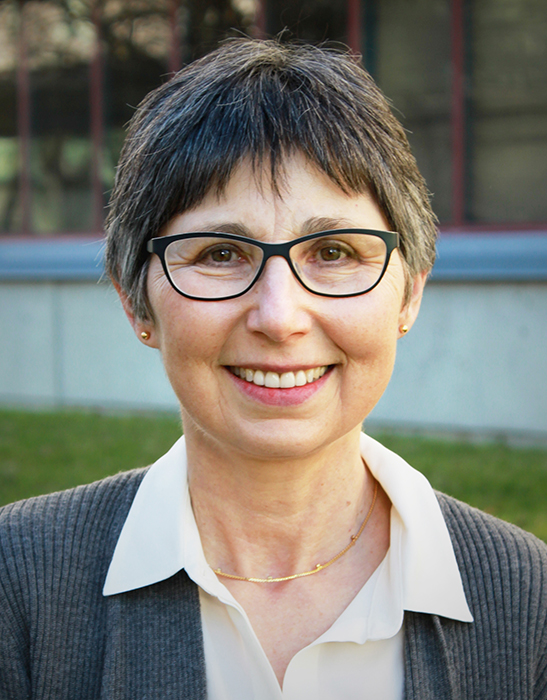
Canadian psychologist Janet F. Werker

- Theodore Wachs
- John B. Watson (1878–1958)
- Sandra Waxman
- Richard A. Weinberg
- Janet F. Werker
- Emmy Werner (1929–2017)

== Z ==
- Carolyn Zahn-Waxler
- Sandra Waxman
- Edward Zigler (1930–2019)
- Pyotr Zinchenko (1903–1969)
