= Federation of Associations in Behavioral & Brain Sciences =

Coalition of behavioral science learned societies

- Abbreviation: FABBS
- Formation: 1981
- Founder: George Mandler, President; Ruby Takanishi, Executive Director
- Headquarters: 1200 New York Ave., NW, Ste 459, Washington, D.C. 20005
- President: Jeff Zacks
- Past-President: Philip Rubin
- Vice President: Adriana Galván
- Publication: Policy Insights from the Behavioral and Brain Sciences
- Website: fabbs.org
- Formerly called: Federation of Behavioral, Psychological, and Cognitive Sciences

The Federation of Associations in Behavioral & Brain Sciences (abbreviated FABBS) is a Washington, D.C.–based coalition of learned societies dedicated to psychology and related behavioral sciences. Its official journal is Policy Insights from the Behavioral and Brain Sciences, which is published by SAGE Publications.

== Purpose ==
The group's stated purpose is to help improve human potential and well-being through supporting mind, brain and behavioral sciences. Functionally, FABBS communicates both to policymakers and the public about basic and applied research in these areas.

== History ==
The Federation of Associations in Behavioral & Brain Sciences was founded in 1981 as the Federation of Behavioral, Psychological, and Cognitive Sciences. Its founding president was George Mandler.

In 2004, the organization established the Foundation for the Advancement of Behavioral & Brain Sciences. In 2009, the organization was renamed to its current name, and the Foundation for the Advancement of Behavioral & Brain Sciences was renamed the FABBS Foundation.

In 2015, the FABBS Foundation was merged into the Federation of Associations in Behavioral & Brain Sciences.

== Members ==
Member societies of FABBS include:

- Academy of Behavioral Medicine Research
- American Educational Research Association
- American Psychological Association
- American Psychosomatic Society
- Association for Applied Psychophysiology and Biofeedback
- Association for Behavior Analysis International
- Behavior Genetics Association
- Cognitive Neuroscience Society
- Cognitive Science Society
- Flux: The Society for Developmental Cognitive Neuroscience
- International Congress of Infant Studies
- International Society for Developmental Psychobiology
- Massachusetts Neuropsychological Society
- National Academy of Neuropsychology
- Psychonomic Society
- Society for Behavioral Neuroendocrinology
- Society for Computation in Psychology
- Society for Judgment and Decision Making
- Society for Mathematical Psychology
- Society for Psychophysiological Research
- Society for Research on Adolescence
- Society for Research in Psychopathology
- Society for Research in Child Development
- Society for Text & Discourse
- Society for the Psychological Study of Social Issues
- Society for the Scientific Study of Reading
- Society of Experimental Social Psychology
- Society of Multivariate Experimental Psychology
- Vision Sciences Society

Each society that is a member of FABBS pays dues to the organization to support its work.
