= SSHD =

SSHD can refer to:

- Solid-state hybrid drive (SSHD), a data storage device.
- Secure Shell daemon (sshd), a computer software
- Society for the Study of Human Development (SSHD), a US-based research society

== See also ==
- Solid-state drive (SSD), another type of data storage device
- Secretary of State for the Home Department
- Super Stardust HD, a 2007 PlayStation 3 game
- Serious Sam HD, a HD remake of the Serious Sam video game
