= Lynn S. Liben =

Developmental psychologist

Lynn S.Liben
- Occupation: Evan Pugh University Professor

Academic background
- Education: Cornell University; University of Michigan

Lynn S. Liben is developmental psychologist known for her research on effects of gender and racial stereotypes on child development. Liben is an Evan Pugh University Professor of Psychology, Human Development and Family Studies, and Education at Pennsylvania State University.

Liben has been honored as the past President of the Society for Research in Child Development (2013–2015). She also served terms as President of American Psychological Association (APA) Division 7, Developmental Psychology (1996–1997), the Jean Piaget Society, and the Society for the Study of Human Development.

== Biography ==
Liben earned her Bachelors of Arts degree in Psychology at Cornell University in 1968. She then completed her PhD at the University of Michigan in Developmental Psychology in 1972 under the supervision of Scott Miller.

Liben began her career as an assistant professor at the University of Rochester before moving to Pennsylvania State University in 1976. She held terms as Editor of the Monographs of the Society for Research in Child Development, Child Development, and the Journal of Experimental Child Psychology.

Liben's research has been funded through grants from the National Science Foundation.

== Research ==
Liben worked with Margaret L. Signorella on research examining how children's gender attitudes influence memory. They devised a memory test for first and second graders that involved showing them pictures of women and men in traditional, non-traditional, and neutral occupations. Children were then given a recognition memory test using some the original photos intermixed with foils in which the gender of the person holding the occupation changed. Results suggested that children's memory for the pictures was affected by the extent to which their own gender attitudes were stereotypical and reflected prevailing gender roles.

Liben and her student Rebecca Bigler conducted influential research on gender and racial stereotyping and prejudice. The researchers proposed a developmental intergroup theory to explain how biases towards different social groups are shaped by environmental factors, including educational, social, and legal policies. Some of Liben's other research has focused on gender differentiation, i.e., the process of assigning social significance to biological differences between the sexes. One of their studies, which involved 11- to 13-year-olds, aimed to establish the reliability of measures of this construct. The researchers explored relations between children's sex typing of others and sex typing of themselves, and found evidence supporting theoretical distinctions relating to individuals' gender attitudes toward others, the feminine self, and the masculine self.

== Books ==
- Blakemore, J. E. O., Berenbaum, S. A., & Liben, L. S. (2008). Gender development. Psychology Press.
- Lerner, R. M., Liben, L. S., & Mueller, U. (2015). Handbook of child psychology and developmental science, cognitive processes (Vol. 2). John Wiley & Sons.
- Liben, L. S. (Ed.). (2009). Current directions in developmental psychology. Pearson College Division.
- Liben, L., & Bigler, R. S. (2014). The role of gender in educational contexts and outcomes. Elsevier.
- Horn, S. S., Ruck, M., & Liben, L. (2016). Equity and justice in developmental science: Implications for young people, families, and communities. Academic Press

== Representative publications ==
- Bigler, R. S., & Liben, L. S. (2007). Developmental intergroup theory: Explaining and reducing children's social stereotyping and prejudice. Current Directions in Psychological Science, 16(3), 162–166.
- Liben, L. S., Bigler, R. S., & Krogh, H. R. (2001). Pink and blue collar jobs: Children's judgments of job status and job aspirations in relation to sex of worker. Journal of Experimental Child Psychology, 79(4), 346–363.
- Liben, L. S., Bigler, R. S., Ruble, D. N., Martin, C. L., & Powlishta, K. K. (2002). The developmental course of gender differentiation: Conceptualizing, measuring, and evaluating constructs and pathways. Monographs of the Society for Research in Child Development. 67(2), i-183.
- Liben, L. S., & Signorella, M. L. (1980). Gender-related schemata and constructive memory in children. Child Development, 51(1), 11–18.
- Quinn, P. C., & Liben, L. S. (2008). A sex difference in mental rotation in young infants. Psychological Science, 19(11), 1067–1070.
