= Toni Antonucci =

American psychologist (born 1948)

Toni C. Antonucci
- Born: September 9, 1948 (age 77); Brooklyn, New York
- Education: Wayne State University
- Scientific career
- Fields: Psychology
- Workplaces: University of Michigan
- Thesis: The Relationship between Attachment and Contingency Learning in Infancy (1973)
- Doctoral advisor: Carolyn Shantz

Toni Claudette Antonucci (born September 9, 1948) is an American psychologist known for her work on social relations and health over the life span. She is the Elizabeth R. Douvan Collegiate Professor and Senior Research Scientist at the Institute for Social Research Life Course at University of Michigan.

Antonucci has led various organizations, serving terms as President of the International Society for the Study of Behavioral Development (2018-2022), the Society for the Study of Human Development (2008-2010), the Gerontological Society of America (2002), and American Psychological Association, Division 20 Adult Development and Aging (1999). She is a Member of the American Academy of Arts and Sciences (elected 2025) and a Fellow of the American Association for the Advancement of Science (elected 2013).

== Biography ==
Antonucci was born and raised in a Brooklyn Italian-American family. Her parents valued an education and encouraged her to get one. She attended an all girls Catholic high school for two years and then transferred to Lafayette High School.

Antonucci received her B.A. from Hunter College in 1969. She subsequently attended the Wayne State University's Department of Psychology, where she received her M.A. in 1972, and her Ph.D in 1973. Her dissertation research, conducted under the supervision of Carolyn Shantz, focused on infant attachment and contingency learning.

Over her career, Autonucci has studied social relations at all stages of the life span from infancy, childhood, adolescence, adulthood, to old age. This has included multigenerational studies of the family and comparative studies of social relations across the life span in the United States, Europe and Japan. Antonucci has strongly criticized the practice of mandatory retirement found in many countries, regarding it as ageism and discriminatory.

Autonucci is the former president of Adult Development and Aging, Division 20 of the American Psychological Association (APA) and the former president of the Gerontological Society of America. She served on the Executive Board of the International Society for the Study of Behavioral Development, and as former secretary general of the International Association of Gerontology and Geriatrics. She received a Research Career Development Award and other research grants from the National Institute of Mental Health, the National Institute on Aging and private foundations, including the Fetzer Institute and the MacArthur Foundation.

Antonucci was married to fellow psychologist James S. Jackson for more than 40 years. They met as graduate students at Wayne State. They shared two daughters, Ariana and Kendra, and grandchildren.

== Accomplishment and awards ==
- 2001 Master Mentor Award from the American Psychological Association, Division 20 (Adult Development and Aging)
- 2011 Distinguished Career Contribution to Gerontology Award from the Gerontologic Society of America
- 2014 Presidential Citation, American Psychological Association
- 2017 Honorary Doctorate, University of Zurich
- 2020 Association for Psychological Science Mentor Award
- 2021 Baltes Distinguished Research Achievement Award from the American Psychological Association, Division 20

== Books ==
- Antonucci, T. C., Jackson, J., & Sterns, H. (2009). Annual Review of Gerontology and Geriatrics, Volume 29, 2009: Life-Course Perspectives on Late Life Health Inequalities. Springer Publishing Company.
- Fingerman, K. L., Berg, C., Smith, J., & Antonucci, T. C. (Eds.). (2010). Handbook of life-span development. Springer Publishing Company.
- Sprott, R. L., & Antonucci, T. C. (Eds.). (2014). Annual Review of Gerontology and Geriatrics, Volume 34, 2014: Genetics. Springer Publishing Company.

== Representative publications ==
- Antonucci, T. C. (1986). Measuring social support networks: Hierarchical mapping technique. Generations: Journal of the American Society on Aging, 10(4), 10–12. http://www.jstor.org/stable/44876253
- Antonucci, T.C., Akiyama, H. (1987). An examination of sex differences in social support among older men and women. Sex Roles, 17, 737–749 https://doi.org/10.1007/BF00287685
- Antonucci, T. C., & Akiyama, H. (1987). Social networks in adult life and a preliminary examination of the convoy model. Journal of Gerontology, 42(5), 519-527. https://doi.org/10.1093/geronj/42.5.519
- Antonucci, T., Akiyama, H., & Takahashi, K. (2004). Attachment and close relationships across the life span. Attachment & Human Development, 6(4), 353–370. https://doi.org/10.1080/1461673042000303136
- Antonucci, T. C., Ajrouch, K. J., & Birditt, K. S. (2014). The convoy model: Explaining social relations from a multidisciplinary perspective. The Gerontologist, 54(1), 82-92. https://doi.org/10.1093/geront/gnt118
- Antonucci, T. C., Ajrouch, K. J., Webster, N. J., & Zahodne, L. B. (2019). Social relations across the life span: Scientific advances, emerging issues, and future challenges. Annual Review of Developmental Psychology, 1(1), 313-336. https://doi.org/10.1146/annurev-devpsych-121318-085212
