= Ruby Takanishi =

American developmental psychologist (1946–2020)

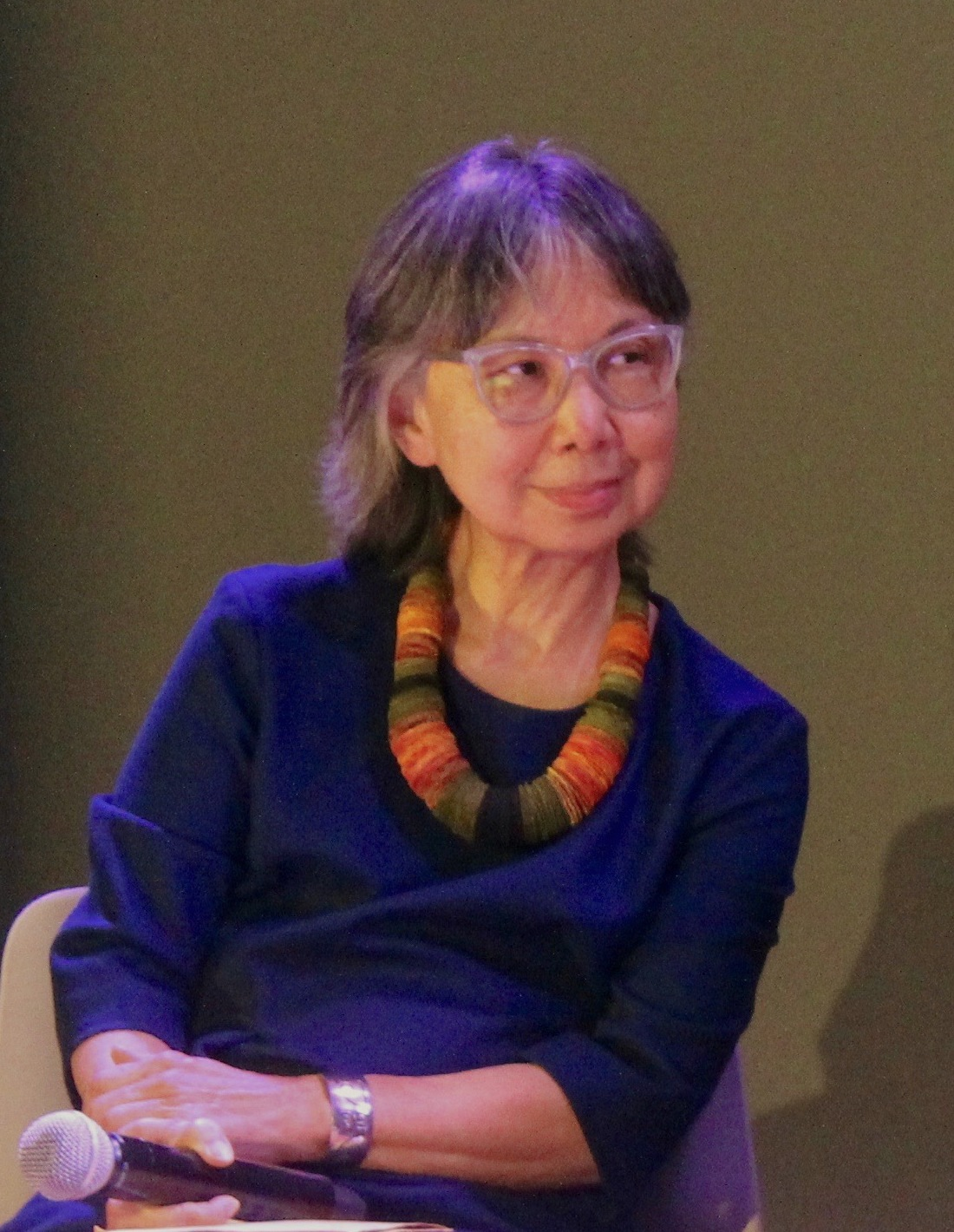
- Occupation: Developmental Psychologist
- Awards: 1997 APA Award for Distinguished Contribution to Research in Public Policy; 2014 AERA Distinguished Public Service Award

Academic background
- Education: Stanford University

Academic work
- Institutions: Foundation for Child Development; New America

Ruby Takanishi (1946 – August 8, 2020) was a developmental psychologist known for her efforts in developing early childhood education policies and advocacy work on behalf of the behavioral sciences.

Takanishi was the Former President/CEO of the Foundation for Child Development and the Founding Executive Director of Federation of Associations in Behavioral & Brain Sciences. At the Foundation for Child Development, Takanishi and her colleagues developed a national index of child well-being, which documented the quality of life of children in the United States.

Takanishi was author of the book "First Things First, Creating the New American Primary School" published in 2016, in which she discussed possible changes to the early education system, including conjoining early childhood education with primary education. She engaged in efforts to promote the PreK-Grade 3 movement in elementary education while advocating for the specific needs of immigrant children and dual language learners.

== Awards ==
Takanishi received multiple awards for her contributions to research connecting child development to public policies. In 1997, she received the American Psychological Association (APA) Award for Distinguished Contribution to Research in Public Policy, with her award citation emphasizing "her outstanding contributions to public policy in the public interest and in recognition of her efforts on behalf of children and adolescents and her work on cognitive, educational, and health aspects of their development that have spanned almost 30 years of untiring work."

Takanishi received the Society for Research in Child Development Award for Distinguished Contributions to Public Policy in 2007 and the American Educational Research Association Distinguished Public Service Award in 2014. Other awards included the 2004 Fred Rogers Leadership Award in Philanthropy for Children, Youth, and Families.

== Biography ==
Takanishi was born in Waimea, Hawaii and attended the local high school, Waimea High School. She received her B.A. in psychology at Stanford University in 1968 and her PhD in Educational Psychology and Child Development at Stanford in 1973. At Stanford, Takanishi studied child development with Eleanor Maccoby.

Takanishi obtained a tenure-track faculty position at the University of California, Los Angeles (UCLA) Graduate School of Education in 1973. After receiving tenure in 1980, she left UCLA and a career in academia to serve on the Senate Appropriations Committee as a Congressional Science Fellow representing the Society for Research in Child Development and the American Association for the Advancement of Science. As a Fellow, she worked with Senator Daniel K. Inouye on programs serving military families, focusing her efforts on childcare, mental health, and domestic violence.

Over her career, Takanishi worked as executive director of the Carnegie Council on Adolescent Development (1986-1996), and as a Senior Research fellow with the Early and Elementary Education Policy program at New America. She held teaching positions at Yale University, Teachers College, Columbia University, and Bank Street College of Education.
