= Research in Human Development =

- Discipline: Developmental psychology
- Language: English
- Edited by: Michael Cunningham

Publication details
- History: 2004–present
- Publisher: Taylor & Francis
- Frequency: Quarterly
- Impact factor: 1.222 (2020)

Standard abbreviations
- ISO 4: Res. Hum. Dev.

Indexing
- ISSN: 1542-7609 (print); 1542-7617 (web)
- LCCN: 2002215604
- OCLC no.: 987638856

Links
- Journal homepage; Online access; Online archive

Research in Human Development is a quarterly peer-reviewed interdisciplinary scientific journal that publishes research on all aspects of human development. Its scope includes the perspectives of biology, psychology, and sociology, among other disciplines. It was established in 2004 and is published by Taylor & Francis. It is the official journal of the Society for the Study of Human Development. The editor-in-chief is Michael Cunningham (Tulane University). According to the Journal Citation Reports, the journal has a 2020 impact factor of 1.222.
