= Arnold J. Sameroff =

American developmental psychologist

Arnold J. Sameroff is an American developmental psychologist. He researches and writes about developmental theory and the factors that contribute to mental health and psychopathology, especially related to risk and resilience. Together with Michael Chandler he is known for developing the transactional model of development. He is one of the founders of the field of developmental psychopathology.

== Early life and education ==
Sameroff was born in Detroit, Michigan and attended Clark University before receiving a BS in psychology from the University of Michigan in 1961, a PhD from Yale University supervised by William Kessen in 1965, and then completed a two-year NIMH post-doctoral fellowship with Hanus Papousek, a developmental pediatrician, at the Institute for the Care of Mother and Child in Prague, Czech Republic from 1965 to 1967.

== Career ==
Sameroff's first academic position was a joint appointment in Psychology, Pediatrics, and Psychiatry at the University of Rochester (1967–78). In 1978 he was appointed as Professor of Psychology and Research Director of the Institute for the Study of Developmental Disabilities at the University of Illinois at Chicago, and in 1986 he became Professor of Psychiatry and Human Behavior at Brown University. In 1992 he moved to the University of Michigan as Professor of Psychology and research professor at the Center for Human Growth & Development where he directed the Center for Development and Mental Health. He retired from Michigan in 2011 where he remains as Professor Emeritus of Psychology and Research Emeritus Professor.

Sameroff also held positions as visiting professor at Birkbeck College, University of London (1974–1975), Visiting Scientist at the Center for Interdisciplinary Research, University of Bielefeld, Germany (1977–1978), Fellow at the center for Advanced Study in the Behavioral Sciences, Stanford, California(1984–1985), Fellow at the Russell Sage Foundation, New York (2002–2003) and Visiting research professor at the Institute of Human Development and Social Change, New York University (2010–2011).

== Research contributions ==
Sameroff was an early contributor to the field of developmental psychology in the 1970s. His work on infant learning and perception bridged between the earlier emphasis on mechanistic learning theory and the newer constructivistic approaches based on the work of Jean Piaget.

In the 1970s Sameroff and his colleagues at the University of Rochester began applying principles of developmental psychology to the study of psychopathology by examining children at high-risk for mental disorders, especially the children of people with schizophrenia. These studies formed the basis for the cumulative-risk model that proposed that the number of contextual risks, regardless of the specific nature of the risks, is a useful predictor of later developmental adjustment.

Sameroff also conducted a number of longitudinal studies with infants, school-age children, adolescents, and young adults to examine the effects of family, community, school, and peer group on social-emotional and academic success using an ecological model of development. These studies further demonstrated the effects of the burden of social-ecological risk factors for children

Based on this research, Sameroff and Chandler proposed the transactional model of child development in 1975. In this model, development is viewed as the result of a set of ongoing interactions between individuals, such as a child and parent, that result in the modification of each individual's behavior. Problem behavior is seen to result from the way an individual's characteristics affect and are affected by others. including ethnic, socioeconomic, and neighborhood backgrounds within a general systems theory framework.

The model has been widely discussed and interpreted, and it was included Wallace Dixon's book Twenty Studies that Revolutionized Child Psychology.

In 2009, Sameroff wrote a book describing the model, and has expanded the model into a unified theory of development integrating a personal change model, a contextual model, a regulation model, and a representational model of development.

== Honors ==
- G.Stanley Hall Award for Distinguished Contribution to Developmental Psychology, Developmental Psychology Division of the American Psychological Association
- Distinguished Scientist Award, the Society for Research in Child Development
- President, Psychology Division of the American Psychological Association (1995–96)
- President, International Society for Infant Studies (2002–04)
- President, Society for Research in Child Development (2007–09)
- Honorary Degree, University of Montreal, 2009

== Selected publications ==
- Sameroff, A. J. (Ed.) (2009). The transactional model of development: How children and contexts shape each other. Washington, DC: American Psychological Association.
- Sameroff, A. J. (2010) A unified theory of development: A dialectic integration of nature and nurture. Child Development, 81, 6-22.
- Sameroff, A. J., Seifer, R., Barocas, R., Zax, M., & Greenspan, S. (1987). IQ scores of 4-year-old children: Social-environmental risk factors. Pediatrics, 79, 343–350.
- Sameroff, A.J. (1971). Can conditioned responses be established in the newborn infant: 1971? Developmental Psychology, 5, 1–12.
- Sameroff, A. J. & Chandler, M. J. (1975). Reproductive risk and the continuum of caretaker casualty. In F. D. Horowitz (Ed.), Review of child development research (Vol. 4). Chicago: University of Chicago Press
- Sameroff, A.J. & Zax, M. (1978). In search of schizophrenia: Young offspring of schizophrenic women. In W. C. Wynne, R. L. Cromwell, & S. Mathysse (Eds.), The nature of schizophrenia: New approaches to research and treatment (pp. 430–441). New York: Wiley.
- Sameroff, A. J., Seifer, R., & Barocas, R. (1983). Developmental impact of parental psychopathology: Diagnosis, severity or social status effects? Infant Mental Health Journal, 4, 236–249.
- Sameroff, A.J. (1972). Learning and adaptation in infancy: A comparison of models. In H. W. Reese (Ed.), Advances in Child Development and Behavior (Vol. 7, pp. 170–214). New York: Academic Press.
- ameroff, A.J., Seifer, R., & Zax, M. (1982). Early development of children at risk for emotional disorder. Monographs of the Society for Research in Child Development, 47(7, Serial No. 199).
- Sameroff, A.J., Seifer, R., Bartko, W.T. (1997). Environmental perspectives on adaptation during childhood and adolescence. In S. S. Luthar, J. A. Barack, D. Cicchetti, & J. Weisz (Eds.), Developmental psychopathology: Perspectives on risk and disorder (pp. 507–526). Cambridge, MA: Cambridge University Press
- Gutman, L.M., Sameroff, A.J., & Cole, R. (2003). Academic growth curve trajectories from first to twelfth grades: Effects of multiple social risk and preschool child factors. Developmental Psychology, 39, 777-790.
