= Cynthia García Coll =

Puerto Rican developmental psychologist

- Education: Harvard University (Ph.D.) University of Florida (M.A.) University of Puerto Rico (B.A.)
- Known for: Research in minority development
- Awards: Urie Bronfenbrenner Award for Lifetime Contribution to Developmental Psychology in the Service of Science and Society, Cultural and Contextual Contributions to Child Development Award
- Scientific career
- Fields: Developmental Psychology

Cynthia García Coll is an American developmental psychologist, and the former editor-in-chief of Child Development. She is currently an adjunct professor in the Pediatrics Department at the University of Puerto Rico, Medical Sciences Campus. She has authored more than a hundred publications, including several books. In 2020, she received the Urie Bronfenbrenner Award for Lifetime Contribution to Developmental Psychology in the Service of Science and Society.

== Career ==
García Coll is a former editor-in-chief of Child Development, and former editor of Developmental Psychology. She earned her Ph.D. from Harvard University, and until 2018, was the Associate Director of the Institutional Center for Scientific Research at Carlos Albizu University, located in San Juan, Puerto Rico. She was also a Professor in the Clinical Psychology program at Albizu. Prior to moving back to Puerto Rico, where she grew up, García Coll was a professor of education, psychology, and pediatrics at Brown University for 30 years. She is now the Charles Pitts Robinson and John Palmer Barstow Professor Emerita at Brown University, as well as an adjunct professor in the Pediatric Department at University of Puerto Rico, Medical Sciences Campus.

García Coll is a fellow of the American Psychological Association, and served as past president of the Society for the Study of Human Development. She was a member of the MacArthur Foundation Network "Successful Pathways Through Middle Childhood" from 1994–2002. In 2009, she received the Cultural and Contextual Contributions to Child Development Award from the Society for Research in Child Development. and in 2020, the Urie Bronfenbrenner Award for Lifetime Contribution to Developmental Psychology in the Service of Science and Society from the American Psychological Association.

García Coll has researched a number of topics, including the resilience of children born to teen mothers and of immigrant children. She has also explored the immigrant paradox, which shows that first-generation immigrant children and adolescents tend to be better adjusted academically and behaviorally than later assimilated generations. García Coll has found that immigrant Hispanic children living in homes where Spanish is spoken are better adjusted than similar immigrant children living in homes where Spanish is not spoken. Her work has also shown that access to social welfare and policies aimed at the inclusion of immigrants have a positive effect on immigrant children's academic success. The graduation rate of children with at least one immigrant parent was 5.3% higher in US states where immigrant families could receive benefits through the Temporary Assistance for Needy Families program, which provides Federal subsidies to low-income families.

In 1996, after previously noting that studies concerning the development of minorities had been done poorly, García Coll introduced her Integrative Model for the Study of Developmental Competencies in Minority Children. The model differed from other developmental frameworks of the time by centering experiences of social position, racism and segregation and considering their interactions. The Integrative Model has been very influential and is still cited today. Further influential work from García Coll includes her papers detailing the differences in home environments of American children of differing age, ethnicity, and poverty status and how these may relate to later behavioral development. She suggested that there is great variance in children's experiences across different ethnicities and levels of income, and loose associations between these factors and a problematic behavioral outcome. This illustrates the complexity in researching and understanding behavior development. As of early 2023, the most recent work from García Coll has explored the impact of the COVID-19 pandemic on child development.

== Personal life ==
García Coll resides in Puerto Rico, outside of the capital San Juan. She has three children, three step-grandchildren and two granddaughters.

== Selected works ==
García Coll has authored more than a hundred publications, including a number of books.

=== Articles ===
- Coll, Cynthia García; Lamberty, Gontran; Jenkins, Renee; McAdoo, Harriet Pipes; Crnic, Keith; Wasik, Barbara Hanna; García, Heidie Vázquez (1996). "An Integrative Model for the Study of Developmental Competencies in Minority Children". Child Development. 67 (5): 1891–1914. doi:10.2307/1131600. JSTOR 1131600. PMID 9022222.
- Bradley, Robert H.; Corwyn, Robert F.; McAdoo, Harriette Pipes; Garcia Coll, Cynthia (2001). "The Home Environments of Children in the United States Part I: Variations by Age, Ethnicity, and Poverty Status". Child Development. 72 (6): 1844–1867. doi:10.1111/1467-8624.t01-1-00382. PMID 11768149.
- García Coll, Cynthia; Kagan, Jerome; Reznick, J. Steven (June 1984). "Behavioral Inhibition in Young Children". Child Development. 55 (3): 1005. doi:10.2307/1130152. JSTOR 1130152.

=== Books ===
- García Coll, Cynthia T. (1 August 1989). Marie de Lourdes Mattei (ed.). The Psychosocial development of Puerto Rican women. Praeger. ISBN 978-0-275-92345-7. OCLC 869059289.
- Lamberty, Gontram; García Coll, Cynthia (21 November 2012). Puerto Rican Women and Children: Issues in Health, Growth, and Development. Springer US. ISBN 978-1-4613-6053-7. OCLC 829749477.
- Coll, Cynthia T. García; Surrey, Janet L. (17 April 1998). Kaethe Weingarten (ed.). Mothering Against the Odds: Diverse Voices of Contemporary Mothers. Guilford Publications. ISBN 978-1-57230-330-0. OCLC 38096903.
- Cooper, Catherine R.; García Coll, Cynthia T.; Bartko, W. Todd; Davis, Helen; Chatman, Celina, eds. (27 June 2005). Developmental Pathways Through Middle Childhood: Rethinking Contexts and Diversity as Resources (1st ed.). Lawrence Erlbaum Associates. ISBN 978-0-8058-5199-1. OCLC 877844534.
- García Coll, Cynthia; Marks, Amy Kerivan (3 April 2009). Immigrant Stories: Ethnicity and Academics in Middle Childhood. Oxford University Press. ISBN 978-0-19-972126-9. OCLC 939700574.
- García Coll, Cynthia T.; Marks, Amy Kerivan (2012). The Immigrant Paradox in Children and Adolescents: Is Becoming American a Developmental Risk?. American Psychological Association. ISBN 978-1-4338-1053-4. OCLC 720259800.
- García Coll, Cynthia T. (2012). The Impact of Immigration on Children's Development. Karger Medical and Scientific Publishers. ISBN 978-3-8055-9798-2. OCLC 867293007.
- Coll, Cynthia Garcia; Bearer, Elaine L.; Lerner, Richard M. (4 April 2014). Nature and Nurture: The Complex Interplay of Genetic and Environmental Influences on Human Behavior and Development. Psychology Press. ISBN 978-1-135-62896-3. OCLC 911177728.

== See also ==
- List of developmental psychologists
- List of psychologists
