= K. Alison Clarke-Stewart =

Canadian psychologist (1943–2014)

K. Alison Clarke-Stewart (born Linda Wilkin, September 23, 1943 – February 23, 2014) was a developmental psychologist and expert on children's social development. She is well known for her work on the effects of child care on children's development, and for her research on children's suggestibility. She has written over 100 articles for scholarly journals and co-authored several leading textbooks in the field.

== Early life and education ==
K. Alison Clarke-Stewart was born and raised in Summerland, British Columbia, Canada. Her childhood years were spent in Summerland and Vancouver. Her father was a high school biology teacher and her mother a homemaker.

Clarke-Stewart earned a Bachelor of Arts degree in psychology and zoology in 1965 and a Master of Arts degree in psychology in 1967, both from the University of British Columbia. She completed her PhD in developmental psychology in 1972 from Yale University, under the guidance of William Kessen.

== Career ==
Clarke-Stewart was a member of the faculty at the University of Chicago from 1975 through 1983. She later joined the faculty at the University of California, Irvine, School of Social Ecology, where she held the titles of research professor and professor emerita of psychology and social behavior. Throughout her career, she authored more than 100 peer-reviewed articles.

== Research ==
=== Child care ===
In the early 1970s, Clarke-Stewart began her research on the effects of child care on children, well before it was a central area of inquiry. At the University of Chicago she initiated a longitudinal study of the joint effects of home environments and child care on children's social, emotional and cognitive development which was reported in her 1994 volume, Children at home and in day care. From the outset, she argued that the negative effects of child care are overestimated and dependent on the quality of outside care. In 1990, the National Institute of Child Health and Human Development (NICHD) established their Early Child Care Research Network and Professor Clarke-Stewart became a founding member and a principal investigator. The network consists of ten principal investigators, their co-investigators, and representatives from NICHD and the Data Coordinating and Analysis Center. This network has published over 70 papers, chapters, monographs and edited volumes based on this longitudinal study.

=== Divorce ===
She researched issues of child custody and the effects of divorce on families. She co-authored two books on divorce with Cornelia Brentano. The first, Divorce Lessons (2005), volume is aimed at parents and practitioners, with a focus on advice to parents for dealing with the aftermath of divorce. The second, Divorce: Causes and Consequences (2006), is a comprehensive review of the effects of divorce on children, adults, and society.

=== Eyewitness testimony in children ===
Clarke-Stewart's focus in this area concerned how suggestibility may influence children's recall of prior events in cases of alleged abuse. In her work, she found that children's recall of a prior encounter with an adult could be distorted by suggestions offered by an interviewer. In related work, she identified child characteristics, such as verbal ability, self-control, and family relationships (such as close ties between child and parent) which may protect children from suggestive questioning. She has also examined jurors' knowledge about the reliability of child witnesses.

=== Parenting and parent education ===
Clarke-Stewart studied the effects of variations in parent interaction patterns on children's emotional, social and cognitive development, both concurrently and longitudinally. She also examined parental education and parental advice as vehicles for improving the quality of parenting, as well as historical shifts in child rearing ideas in the United States.

== Awards and honors ==
- First Award, Creative Talents Program, American Institutes for Research, 1972.
- Fellow, Center for Advanced Study in the Behavioral Sciences, 1982–83.
- Fellow, American Psychological Association, 1985.
- Visiting Scholar, Wolfson College, Oxford University, 1989.
- Fellow, American Psychological Society, 1994.

== Selected publications ==
=== Books ===
- Clarke-Stewart, K. A., Gruber, C. P., & Fitzgerald, L. M. (1994). Children at Home and in Day Care. Hillsdale New Jersey: Erlbaum.
- Clarke-Stewart, K. A. (1982; 2nd ed. 1993). Daycare. Cambridge, Massachusetts: Harvard University Press.
- Clarke-Stewart, K. A., & Koch, J. (1983). Children: Development through Adolescence. New York: Wiley.
- Clarke-Stewart, K. A., & Friedman, S. (1987). Child Development: Infancy through Adolescence. New York:: Wiley.
- Clarke-Stewart, K. A., Perlmutter, M., & Friedman, S. (1988). Lifelong Human Development. New York: Wiley.
- Bernstein, D. A., Penner, L. A., Clarke-Stewart, A., & Roy, E. J. (2003, 2006, 2008). Psychology. (6th, 7th, 8th eds). Boston: Houghton Mifflin.
- Clarke-Stewart, K. A., & Allhusen, V. (2005). What We Know about Childcare. Cambridge, Massachusetts: Harvard University Press.
- Clarke-Stewart, K. A.,. & Brentano, C. (2005). Divorce Lessons: Real-life Stories and What You Can Learn from Them. Charleston, South Carolina: BookSurge Publishing.
- Clarke-Stewart, K. A., & Brentano, C. (2006). Divorce: Causes and Consequences. New Haven, Connecticut: Yale University Press.
- Clarke-Stewart, A. & Parke, R. (2014) Social Development (2nd ed.) Hoboken, New Jersey: Wiley.

=== Articles ===
- Clarke-Stewart, K. A. (1978). "And daddy makes three: The father's impact on mother and young child". Child Development, 49:466–478.
- Clarke-Stewart, K. A. (1978). "Popular primers for parents". American Psychologist, 33:359–369.
- Clarke-Stewart, K. A., VanderStoep, L., & Killian, G. A. (1979). "Analysis and replication of mother-child relations at two years of age". Child Development, 50:777–793.
- Clarke-Stewart, K. A., Umeh, B. J., Snow, M. E., & Pederson, J. A. (1980). "Development and prediction of children's sociability from 1 to 2 ½ years of age". Developmental Psychology, 16:290–302.
- Clarke-Stewart, K. A. (1992). "Developmental psychology in the real world: A paradigm of parent education". Early Development and Parenting, 1:5-14.
- Clarke-Stewart, K. A., & Hayward, C. (1996). "Advantages of father custody and contact for the psychological well-being of school-age children". Journal of Applied Developmental Psychology, 17: 239–270.
- Clarke-Stewart, K. A., Vandell, D. L., McCartney, K., Owen, M. T., & Booth, C. (2000). "Effects of parental separation and divorce on very young children". Journal of Family Psychology, 14:304–326.
