= Núria Sebastián Gallés =

Spanish psychologist & scholar

- Awards: Narcis Monturiol Medal (2012); Fellow of the British Academy (2016)

Academic background
- Education: University of Barcelona (BA, PhD)
- Thesis: Análisis morfológico y estructura del lexicón (1986)
- Academic advisor: Jacques Mehler

Academic work
- Discipline: Cognitive scientist
- Sub-discipline: Language development; Bilingualism
- Institutions: Pompeu Fabra University

Núria Sebastián Gallés is a cognitive scientist known for her work on bilingual language development and the impact of bilingualism on cognition. She is Professor of Psychology at Pompeu Fabra University where she heads the Speech Acquisition and Perception (SAP) Research Group. In 2012, Sebastián Gallés received the Narcis Monturiol Medal as recognition of her scientific contributions. She was elected Fellow of the British Academy in 2016.

Sebastián Gallés served as President of the European Society of Cognitive Psychology (2011–2013) and was appointed as a member of the Scientific Council of the European Research Council in 2013. She has served as Vice President of the Scientific Council of the European Research Council. She has held positions of Associate Editor of Language Learning and Development and Editor of the Cognitive Neuroscience Series of Language Learning.

== Biography ==
Sebastián Gallés completed her PhD in Experimental Psychology at the University of Barcelona in 1986, where her work focused on morphological analysis and structure of the lexicon (dissertation title: Análisis morfológico y estructura del lexicón). She received post-doctoral training at the Max Planck Institute and at the LSCP-CNRS in Paris, where she was mentored by Jacques Mehler.

Sebastián Gallés joined the Faculty of the Psychology Department in the University of Barcelona in 1988. In 2009, she moved to the University Pompeu Fabra where she is Professor of Psychology and Director of the Center of Brain and Cognition. Her research program on early language acquisition and bilingualism has been funded by the James S. McDonnell Foundation, awarded in 2000, and through the ICREA Acadèmia Awards, given in 2008 and 2013. Sebastián Gallés was coordinator of the Consolider-Ingenio 2010 research consortium from 2007 to 2012, which used cognitive neuroscience methods to study bilingualism.

Sebastián Gallés has been a guest researcher at several research centers, including the University of Pennsylvania, the University College London and the University of Chicago. She gave the prestigious Nijmegen Lectures in 2005.

== Research ==
Sebastián Gallés is known for her research on bilingual language development. With her colleagues in the SAP Research Group, Sebastián Gallés has used electrophysiology to study brain activity associated with speech perception and language processing in participants ranging from young infants to adults. Several of their studies have focused on infants' early capabilities to track the features of the various languages to which they are exposed, with a specific emphasis on how infants raised in monolingual and bilingual families differ in their ability to discriminate speech sounds.

In collaboration with Janet Werker and others, Sebastián Gallés has explored bilingual advantages in visual language discrimination in Infancy, described as the ability to distinguish languages using articulatory mouth movements observed in silent videos. At 4 and 6 months of age, infants raised in monolingual (English) and bilingual (French-English) homes were successful in using articulatory gestures to distinguish French and English languages; however, at 8 months of age, only the bilingual infants were successful at this task. Later studies indicated that the bilingual advantage extended to infants' ability to visually discriminate unfamiliar languages to which they had no previous exposure.

== Representative publications ==
- Bosch, L., & Sebastián-Gallés, N. (2001). Evidence of early language discrimination abilities in infants from bilingual environments. Infancy, 2(1), 29–49.
- Costa, A., & Sebastián-Gallés, N. (2014). How does the bilingual experience sculpt the brain? Nature Reviews Neuroscience, 15(5), 336–345.
- Perani, D., Paulesu, E., Sebastián-Gallés, N., Dupoux, E., Dehaene, S., Bettinardi, V., ... & Mehler, J. (1998). The bilingual brain. Proficiency and age of acquisition of the second language. Brain, 121(10), 1841–1852.
- Sebastián-Gallés, N., Dupoux, E., Segui, J., & Mehler, J. (1992). Contrasting syllabic effects in Catalan and Spanish. Journal of Memory and Language, 31(1), 18–32.
- Sebastián-Gallés, N., Echeverría, S., & Bosch, L. (2005). The influence of initial exposure on lexical representation: Comparing early and simultaneous bilinguals. Journal of Memory and Language, 52(2), 240–255.
- Sebastián-Gallés, N., & Soto-Faraco, S. (1999). Online processing of native and non-native phonemic contrasts in early bilinguals. Cognition, 72(2), 111–123.
