= Melanie Killen =

American psychologist

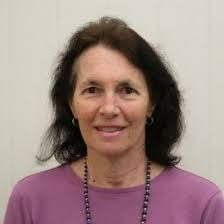
A photo of Dr. Melanie Killen

Melanie Killen, Ph. D. is an American developmental psychologist and Distinguished University Professor in the Department of Human Development and Quantitative Methodology, and Professor of Psychology (Affiliate) at the University of Maryland. She is also Honorary Professor of Psychology at the University of Kent, Canterbury, UK. She is the Director of the Social and Moral Development Lab at the University of Maryland.

== Funding ==
Killen is supported, in part, by funding from the National Institute of Child Health and Human Development (NICHD), and the National Science Foundation (NSF) for her research.

== Awards and honors ==
- Elected member of the National Academy of Education (2024)
- Recipient of the Jean Piaget Society Award for Distinguished Contribution to Development Science (2024)
- Fellow of the American Psychological Association (APA) (2014)
- Fellow of the Association for Psychological Science (APS)
- Fellow of the Society for the Psychology Study of Social Issues (SPSSI) (2013)

== Education ==
Killen obtained her Ph.D. in Developmental Psychology from the University of California, Berkeley, where she was a NIMH Predoctoral trainee. Her PhD advisor was Elliot Turiel. She received her B.A. in Psychology from Clark University, where she was awarded a New England Psychological Association undergraduate Honorary Fellow.

== Research ==
Killen, along with Adam Rutland, developed the Social Reasoning Developmental (SRD) model which draws on social domain theory and social identity theory to investigate children's and adolescents' evaluations. predictions, and reasoning about intergroup relationships. Intergroup relationships are defined as contexts in which individuals make decisions that bear on group identity, such as gender, race, ethnicity, immigrant status, wealth status, religion, and nationality, and reflect group dynamics.

Research guided by the theory has shown that children and adolescents use multiple forms of reasoning, morality, group identity, and psychological knowledge when making decisions and evaluating intergroup contexts. Morality includes fairness, equality, others' welfare, wrongfulness of discrimination and rights Group identity includes group dynamics, in-group preferences and outgroup distrust, which are often activated in contexts of threat. Further, group advantaged and disadvantaged status, and group functioning are often incorporated in children's decisions to include and exclude peers. As well, psychological knowledge including attributions of intentions and mental state knowledge are significant factors contributing to decisions about actions in intergroup contexts.

== Educational Programs ==
Killen received funding from the National Science Foundation and the National Institutes of Child Health and Human Development to conduct randomized control trial (RCT) of a program developed by her team designed to reduce prejudice and bias and promote positive intergroup friendships in childhood. The program is called Developing Inclusive Youth (DIY) and has a teaching component called Teaching Inclusive Youth (TIY). The results were promising for reducing bias in classrooms contexts and increasing the desire to play with diverse peers. The program has been implemented in schools interested in addressing prejudice and bias in childhood.

== Media and Policy Applications ==
In 2011-2012, Killen and her research team were commissioned by Anderson Cooper at CNN AC360 to conduct a study on children's racial biases which aired in April 2012, and won an Emmy Award for Outstanding News and Analysis, October 1, 2013.
