= Jeff Zacks =

American psychologist

Jeffrey Zacks
- Education: Stanford University; Yale University
- Scientific career
- Fields: Psychology
- Workplaces: Washington University in St. Louis
- Thesis: Event structure perception: Studies in perceiving, remembering, and communicating (1999)
- Doctoral advisor: Barbara Tversky

Jeffrey Zacks is an American psychologist. He is currently the chair in Psychology and the Edgar James Swift Professor in Arts and Sciences at Washington University in St. Louis. He is an Elected Fellow of the American Association for the Advancement of Science. He specializes in research on event segmentation, media processing, and cognition in natural settings. His laboratory at Washington University focuses on the development of neurological disorders through the use of various psychological testing methods.
