= Kirby Deater-Deckard =

American developmental psychologist

- Education: Pennsylvania State University; University of Virginia
- Awards: Fellow of the Association for Psychological Science (2008)
- Scientific career
- Fields: Developmental psychology
- Institutions: University of Oregon; Virginia Tech; University of Massachusetts Amherst
- Thesis: Differential Discipline and Parent Perceptions of Siblings' Characteristics: Comparing Between- and Within-Family Analyses (1994)
- Doctoral advisors: Sandra Scarr; Richard Q. Bell; Charlotte Patterson; Emily Hauenstein

Kirby D. Deater-Deckard is an American developmental psychologist who is Professor of Psychological & Brain Sciences at the University of Massachusetts Amherst, as well as director of the Healthy Development Initiative at the UMass Center in Springfield. He has been a fellow of the Association for Psychological Science since 2008. Dr. Deater-Deckard is also the co-author (along with Dr. John W. Santrock) of a number of textbooks like "Children, 15th Edition" and "Child Development: An Introduction" (now in the 16th edition).
