= Wendy Craig (psychologist) =

Canadian psychologist

Wendy Craig OC OOnt FRSC
- Born: Wendy Marion Craig
- Occupations: Psychologist; professor

Academic background
- Education: York University
- Thesis: Naturalistic Observations of Bullies and Victims in the School Yard (1993)
- Academic advisor: Debra Pepler

Academic work
- Discipline: Psychology
- Institutions: Queen's University

Wendy Marion Craig OC OOnt FRSC is a Canadian clinical-developmental psychologist known for her research and advocacy in the field of childhood bullying. She is a professor in the Department of Psychology at Queen's University at Kingston in Ontario, Canada.

== Education ==
Craig completed a B.A. degree at the University of British Columbia in 1985 and a M.A. degree from York University in 1989. In 1993, Craig earned her PhD in clinical developmental psychology from York University, under the supervision of Dr. Debra Pepler. For her doctoral dissertation, entitled Naturalistic Observations of Bullies and Victims in the School Yard, Craig recorded the interactions of elementary school students and described their bullying experiences (including where incidents occurred and how frequently adults intervened).

== Career ==
Craig joined the Queen's University faculty in 1994. She is a professor in the Department of Psychology.

Craig has published widely on issues related to children's social relationships, including such topics as bullying, cyberbullying, and children's mental health. She also regularly contributes her expertise to television, radio, and print media. In 1997, she and Pepler appeared on an episode of The Oprah Winfrey Show to discuss their work on bullying.

In 2006, Craig and Pepler co-founded Promoting Relationships and Eliminating Violence Network (PREVNet), a collaboration between academics and community organizations dedicated to the prevention of childhood bullying and the promotion of healthy relationships.

== Awards and honours ==
For her work building PREVNet, Craig was awarded the Social Science and Humanities Research Council Partnership Award in 2014.

Craig was elected a Fellow of the Royal Society of Canada in 2014. She was appointed to the Order of Ontario in 2016 and to the Order of Canada in 2018.

== Selected publications ==
- Craig, Wendy M.; Pepler, Debra J. (1998). "Observations of Bullying and Victimization in the School Yard". Canadian Journal of School Psychology. 13 (2): 41–59. doi:10.1177/082957359801300205. S2CID 143765627.
- O'Connell, Paul; Pepler, Debra; Craig, Wendy (1999). "Peer involvement in bullying: Insights and challenges for intervention". Journal of Adolescence. 22 (4): 437–452. doi:10.1006/jado.1999.0238. PMID 10469508.
- Craig, Wendy M.; Pepler, Debra; Atlas, Rona (2000). "Observations of Bullying in the Playground and in the Classroom". School Psychology International. 21: 22–36. doi:10.1177/0143034300211002. S2CID 146140435.
- Craig, Wendy M.; Henderson, Kathryn; Murphy, Jennifer G. (2000). "Prospective Teachers' Attitudes toward Bullying and Victimization". School Psychology International. 21: 5–21. doi:10.1177/0143034300211001. S2CID 144960838.
- Janssen, I.; Craig, W. M.; Boyce, W. F.; Pickett, W. (2004). "Associations Between Overweight and Obesity with Bullying Behaviors in School-Aged Children". Pediatrics. 113 (5): 1187–1194. doi:10.1542/peds.113.5.1187. PMID 15121928.
- Craig, Wendy; Harel-Fisch, Yossi; Fogel-Grinvald, Haya; Dostaler, Suzanne; Hetland, Jorn; Simons-Morton, Bruce; Molcho, Michal; De Mato, Margarida Gaspar; Overpeck, Mary; Due, Pernille; Pickett, William (2009). "A cross-national profile of bullying and victimization among adolescents in 40 countries". International Journal of Public Health. 54 (Suppl 2): 216–224. doi:10.1007/s00038-009-5413-9. PMC 2747624. PMID 19623475.
