= Edith Ackermann =

American psychologist

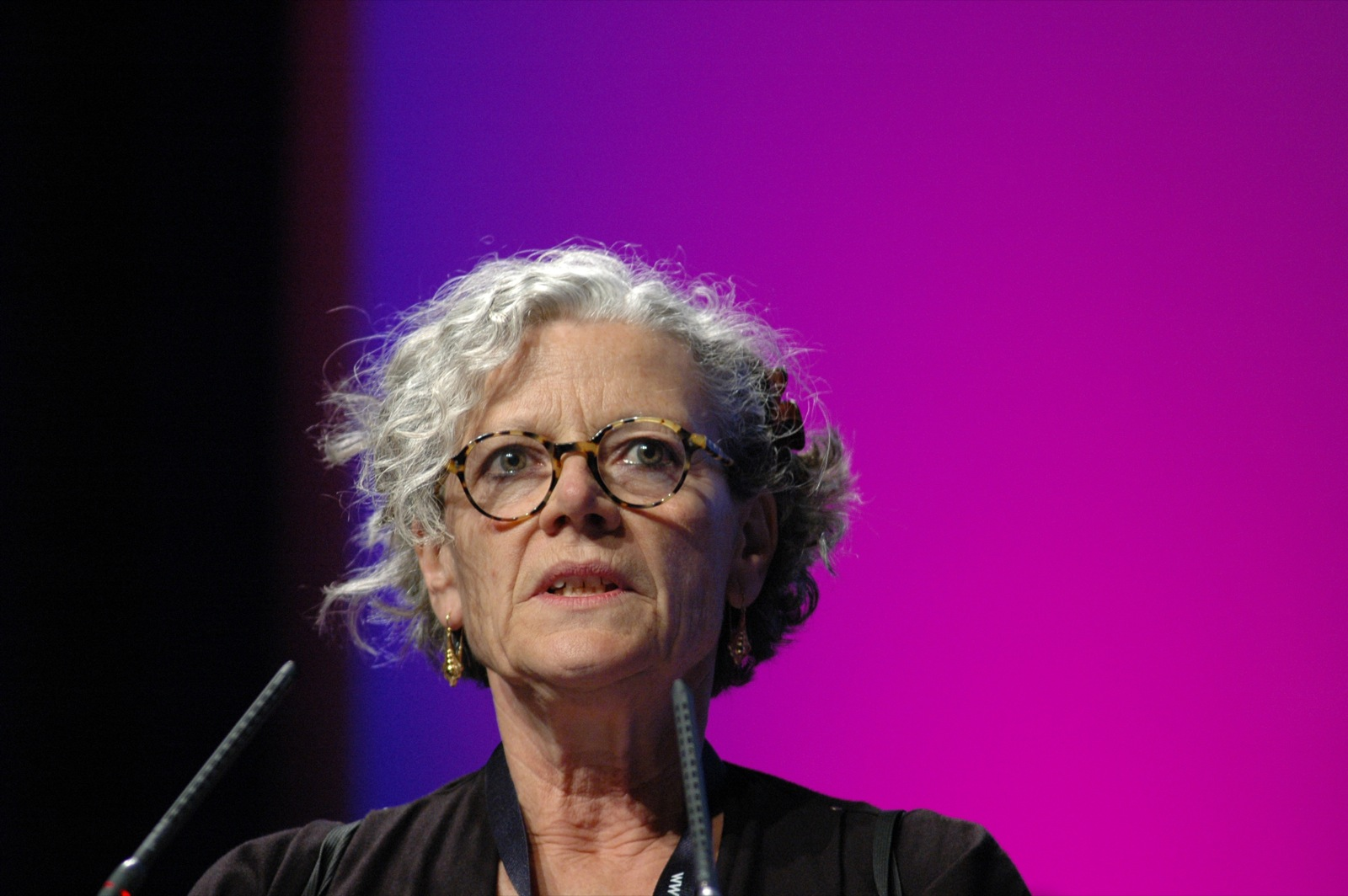
- Born: April 23, 1946; Switzerland
- Died: December 24, 2016 (aged 69–70); Cambridge, Massachusetts
- Education: University of Geneva
- Scientific career
- Fields: Developmental psychology
- Workplaces: MIT Media Lab

Edith K. Ackermann (April 23, 1946 – December 24, 2016) was a Swiss-born American psychologist who explored the interactions between developmental psychology, play, learning and design. A graduate of the University of Geneva, and a protege to Jean Piaget, she held permanent and visiting positions at several institutions in the United States and Europe, including the MIT Media Lab.

== Early life and education ==
Ackermann was born in Switzerland in 1946. When she was a small child, Ackermann moved with her family to the hills outside of Cannes. Her mother Edith and her stepfather Klaus Peter Wieland both worked as magazine correspondents; Klaus Peter's father was painter Hans Beat Wieland. She attended the University of Geneva for an undergraduate degree, a master's degree and a Ph.D. in developmental psychology.

Soon after graduating, she was a junior faculty member in psychology at the University of Geneva and a research associate of Jean Piaget at the Centre International d'Epistémologie Génétique.

== Career ==
Ackermann's career focused on developmental psychology, play and the influence of technology on childhood learning. She worked for the MIT Media Lab with constructionism expert Seymour Papert. Using Papert's Logo programming language, Ackermann and Papert did work for The Lego Group that led to the development of Lego Mindstorms. She was also a visiting scientist at the MIT School of Architecture, was Honorary Professor of Psychology the University of Aix-Marseille I, and was a visiting professor at the University of Siena in Italy. In addition, she worked closely with the Harvard Graduate School of Design. Ackermann was an Osher Fellow at the Exploratorium.

Ackermann conducted early research that attempted to reconcile Piagetian principles with situated learning. Reanalyzing Piaget's work with the water-level task in terms of how children move from concrete thinking to abstraction, Ackermann wrote that Piaget's theory deals with how children become detached from concrete objects, where other theorists focused on the children's attachment to concrete items. In other work with Marina Bers, Ackermann studied hospitalized pediatric heart patients and found that they benefited from an interactive storytelling environment.

== Later life ==
In the early 2000s Edith coauthored guides for parents to aid in the development of their children with funding from LEGO. She also mentored numerous students by reading and sharing reflections on their works with them. She also advised design and R&D firms, INVIVIA and bespoke R&D.

Late in life, Ackermann became a close companion of Swiss philosopher Ernst von Glasersfeld; the pair met many years earlier while working with Piaget. In 2008, he moved to Massachusetts, and they began meeting frequently and working on an essay that remained unfinished upon his death in 2010.

== Awards ==
In late 2016, Ackermann received a lifetime achievement award at the FabLearn Conference at the Stanford Graduate School of Education.
