= Willis Overton =

American psychologist

Willis F. Overton
- Born: Norwalk, Connecticut
- Education: Boston University; Clark University
- Awards: 1982 Lindback Award
- Scientific career
- Fields: Clinical psychology Developmental psychology
- Institutions: Temple University
- Thesis: Ontogenetic changes in specification of object usages: effect of set for concrete manipulative functions (1967)
- Website: sites.temple.edu/woverton/

Willis Franklin Overton, Jr. is an American psychologist whose research is in the fields of clinical and developmental psychology. He is the Thaddeus L. Bolton Professor of Psychology Emeritus at Temple University, where he was the chair of the psychology department from 2000 to 2006. He is a fellow of the American Psychological Association's Divisions 7 (Developmental Psychology), 12 (Clinical Psychology), and 20 (Adult Development & Aging). He was formerly the president of the Jean Piaget Society and the Society for the Study of Human Development.
