= Elliot Turiel =

Psychologist

Elliot Turiel (born 1938) is a psychologist and Distinguished Professor in the Berkeley School of Education at the University of California, Berkeley. He teaches courses on human development and its relation to education. He was born in Rhodes, Greece.

== Education ==
Turiel completed his PhD in Psychology from Yale University and was a student of Lawrence Kohlberg, who had a strong influence on his work.

== Research ==
Turiel conducts research in the development of social judgments and action, the development of moral reasoning, children’s conceptions of authority and rules in school settings, as well as culture and social development. He has also been a Guggenheim Fellow and a National Institute of Mental Health Fellow. His area of specialization includes cognitive development, Moral and ethical studies, and social and emotional development.

== Books and publications ==
Following are the books and other publications by Turiel.

- The development of social knowledge: Morality and convention (1983) - citations
- The Development of Morality, published in Handbook of Child Psychology (1998)
- The Culture of Morality: Social Development, Context, and Conflict, from Cambridge University Press (2002)
- Social interactions and the development of social concepts in preschool children published in Child Development (1978)
- Morality: Its structure, functions, and vagaries published in The Emergence of Morality in Young Children (with Melanie Killen and Charles Helwig, 1987)
- An experimental test of the sequentiality of developmental stages in the child's moral judgments published in (1966)
- Moral Reasoning About Human Welfare in Adolescents and Adults: Judging Conflicts Involving Sacrificing and Saving Lives (with Audun Dahl, Matthew Gingo, and Kevin Uttich, 2018)
