= Debra Pepler =

Canadian psychologist

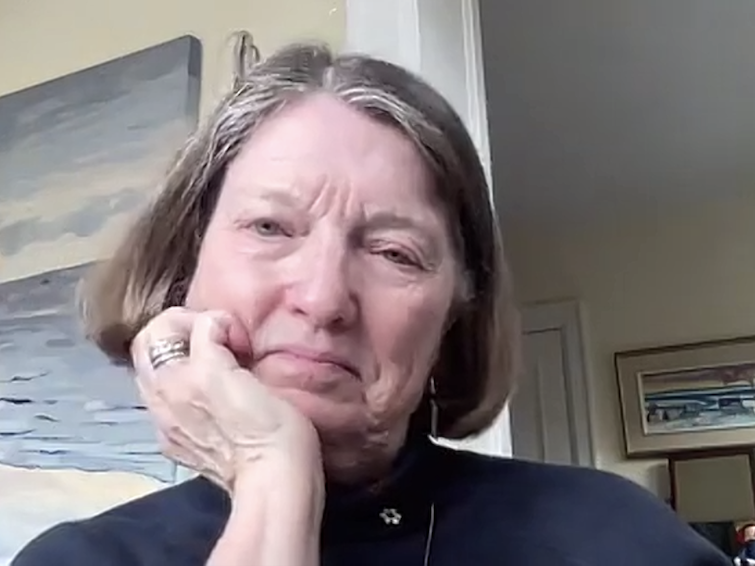
Debra Pepler at TMI's 29th Annual Conference 2025

Debra Pepler OC is a Canadian psychologist known for her research and advocacy within the field of childhood aggression and bullying about which she is often interviewed in the media. She is currently a distinguished research professor at York University in Toronto, Ontario.

== Career ==
Pepler completed a Bachelor of Arts degree at Queen's University in 1973, followed by a Master of Science degree at Dalhousie University in 1976. In 1979, she was awarded her PhD from the University of Waterloo. She has been a faculty member in the Department of Psychology at York University since 1988 and a senior associate scientist at the Hospital for Sick Children in Toronto since 2001.

Pepler is a nationally recognized expert in the field of childhood aggression, including bullying. She has co-edited 12 books and published over 200 refereed journal articles, book chapters, and white papers. In one major project, Pepler and colleagues recorded and analyzed video footage of children's interactions on the playground and in the classroom, observing their bullying experiences, targets' coping styles, and peers' responses.

In 1997, she appeared on an episode of the Oprah Winfrey Show to discuss her work on bullying.

In 2006, Pepler co-founded (with Wendy Craig, her first PhD student) Promoting Relationships and Eliminating Violence Network (PREVNet), a collaboration between researchers and community organizations dedicated to preventing childhood bullying and violence.

In 2015, Pepler was awarded the Donald O. Hebb Award for Distinguished Contributions to Psychology as a Science, by the Canadian Psychological Association. In 2019, she was named an Officer of the Order of Canada.

== Selected works ==
- Pepler, Debra J.; Craig, Wendy M. (1995). "A peek behind the fence: Naturalistic observations of aggressive children with remote audiovisual recording". Developmental Psychology. 31 (4): 548–553. doi:10.1037/0012-1649.31.4.548.
- O'Connell, Paul; Pepler, Debra; Craig, Wendy (1999). "Peer involvement in bullying: Insights and challenges for intervention". Journal of Adolescence. 22 (4): 437–452. doi:10.1006/jado.1999.0238. PMID 10469508.
- Smith, Peter K.; Pepler, Debra; Rigby, Ken (2004-10-21). Bullying in Schools: How Successful Can Interventions Be?. Cambridge University Press. ISBN 9780521528030.
- Pepler, Debra J.; Craig, Wendy M.; Connolly, Jennifer A.; Yuile, Amy; McMaster, Loren; Jiang, Depeng (2006). "A developmental perspective on bullying". Aggressive Behavior. 32 (4): 376–384. doi:10.1002/ab.20136.
- Pepler, Debra; Jiang, Depeng; Craig, Wendy; Connolly, Jennifer (2008). "Developmental Trajectories of Bullying and Associated Factors". Child Development. 79 (2): 325–338. doi:10.1111/j.1467-8624.2007.01128.x. PMID 18366426.
