= Andrea Smorti =

Italian developmental psychologist

- Born: 1949 (age 76–77); Florence, Italy
- Education: University of Florence; University of Siena
- Scientific career
- Workplaces: University of Florence
- Website: unifi.academia.edu/AndreaSmorti

Andrea Smorti (born 1949) is an Italian psychologist and professor of developmental psychology who studies cognitive and narrative processes at the University of Florence. He founded the laboratory of methods and analysis techniques of illness experiences. He is the director of the laboratory of developmental process evaluation, Laboratory in the Department of Education, Languages, Inter-culture, Literature, and psychology at the University of Florence.

== Education ==
Andrea Smorti was born in Florence in 1949, and attended the University of Florence in his hometown, where he received his Bachelor of Arts and Master in philosophy with honors from the University of Florence in 1974. He got his post-graduate degree with honors from the School of Psychology at the University of Siena. He received a Merit Certificate for excellence in sports psychology. In 1988, he received a research scholarship as visiting researcher in the faculty of psychology at the University of Geneva.

Smorti served multiple roles in the University of Florence. He became the Dean of the faculty of psychology in 2008. He also worked as an editor and as a member for different journals (1999-2014). He was the editorial board member of the journal Open Psychology.

He mostly researches in developmental psychology, educational psychology, and psychology of childhood, adolescence, and adulthood. He has acted as Erasmus professor and visiting professor in Masters and Doctorate courses in multiple universities in Europe, North America, Portugal, Switzerland, Canada, and Latin America (1997-2017).

== Research and career ==
Smorti started his career on the issue of parental influences on earliest memories. He did research on multiple aspects, including European networks on bullying and educated students and parents, narrative inquiries and developmental processes, mental representation and graphical representation in drawings, children's fear, and parental attitudes during diseases, narrative and self-construction, logical-symbolic aspects in narrative classification, academic traumatic events, autobiographical memories, and developmental outcomes.

He participated in national projects on symbolic and cognitive representation of play and classification experiences, narration of quarrels between companions: textual and contextual aspects, as a coordinator for intergenerational and intragenerational transactions in the new millennium society (Protocol 2202115382 Area 11) and in the quality of intimate relationships in transition to adulthood, RE.NA.ME (Relation- Narrative- Memory) model in a hospital field, implementation, and assessment of a narrative based medicine protocol founded on the autobiographical listening and research on ' reflexive professionals".

== Select publications ==
- Smorti, A. (2018). Raccontare per capire. Il Mulino, Bologna
- Smorti, A. (1994). Il Pensiero Narrativo. Giunti, Firenze
- Smorti, A. (1997). Il Sé come testo (Self like a text). Giunti, Firenze,
- Smorti, A., Menesini, E., & Smith, P.K (2003). Parents' definition of children's bullying in a five-country comparison. Journal of cross-cultural psychology, Vol. 34(4), 417-432
- Peterson, C., Bonechi, A., Smorti, A., & Tani F. (2010). A distant mirror: memories of parents and friends across childhood and adolescence. British journal of psychology, 101, 601 – 620;
- Smorti, A., Pananti, B., & Rizzo, A. (2010). Autobiography as a tool to improve lifestyle, wellbeing
- Smorti A. (2011). Autobiographical memory and autobiographical narrative: What is the relationship? Narrative Inquiry, 21, 303-310
- Tani, F., Smorti, A., & Peterson, C. (2015). Is friendship quality reflected in memory narratives? Journal of Social and Personal Relationships. 32(3), 281–303.
