= Carol Nagy Jacklin =

American psychologist & academic

- Born: February 23, 1939
- Died: August 8, 2011 (aged 72)
- Education: University of Connecticut Brown University
- Known for: Gender studies Psychology

Carol Nagy Jacklin (1939 - 2011) was a developmental psychologist and gender scholar. She was the first woman to be dean of the Division of Social Sciences at the University of Southern California. She was a Women's Rights activist.

== Education ==
Carol Nagy was born in Chicago, Illinois on February 23, 1939. Nagy completed high school in Oak Park. As Nagy was preparing for college at the University of Wisconsin, she met and married her husband. After transferring to the University of Connecticut. Carol Jacklin completed a BA and MA in psychology. Short on money, Carol Jacklin became a teacher at the University of Connecticut and then San Jose City College. After attending a psychology conference she decided to get a PhD in developmental psychology, after which she applied and was accepted for postgraduate studies at Brown University. where she completed her PhD at Brown University in 1972.

== Research ==
Jacklin moved to Stanford and completed postdoctoral studies alongside Eleanor Maccoby. Jacklin and Maccoby studied parent-child interactions, identifying negative portrayals of women in scientific literature. Their research was published in the critically acclaimed 1974 book "The Psychology of Sex Differences", which became front page of The New York Times Book Review. In 1975 it was a best seller in The New York Times. Here they dismissed many beliefs about gender differences; that girls are more social than boys, and have lower self-esteem and are better at rote learning. Jacklin and Maccoby argued that the evidence of their research does not support the stigmas surrounding gender differences in society.

At Stanford Jacklin was a vocal women's rights activist, who campaigned against injustices forced upon women. She was a founding member of the Clayman Institute for Gender Research alongside Myra Strober. In 1983, The New York Times described her as a "leading expert on gender differences". Jacklin and Maccoby were two of the first researchers to study the differences between boys’ and girls’ learning.

Jacklin moved her studies to the University of Southern California in 1983, where she became the first female psychology tenured professor. She was also the first woman to be chair of the psychology department in 1990, the first paid chair of the Program for the Study of Women and Men in Society, and the first woman to be appointed Dean of the Division of Social Sciences in 1992. After these profound accomplishments, Jacklin took leave to work with biologists researching endocrinology at Caltech, and used her expertise to implement policy changes for the fair treatment of female faculty members and students.

In 1995 Jacklin became Dean of the College of William and Mary. She instituted positive changes in the university's recruitment of women and minorities. With her extensive knowledge of gender differences and similarities, Jacklin served as an expert witness in sexual discrimination cases against corporations such as AT&T and General Motors. and helped women seeking admission to the Virginia Military Institute and the Citadelto be treated fairly and equally.

After her long career, Jacklin retired to San Diego, where she became a certified Master Gardener. She wrote a newspaper column "Mountain Greening" for local newspapers. Jacklin had a daughter, Beth Nagy, and son, Phillip Jacklin. In 2011 she rejected Chemotherapy for a diagnosis of terminal cancer, and died one week later.
