= Rebecca Bigler =

Developmental psychologist

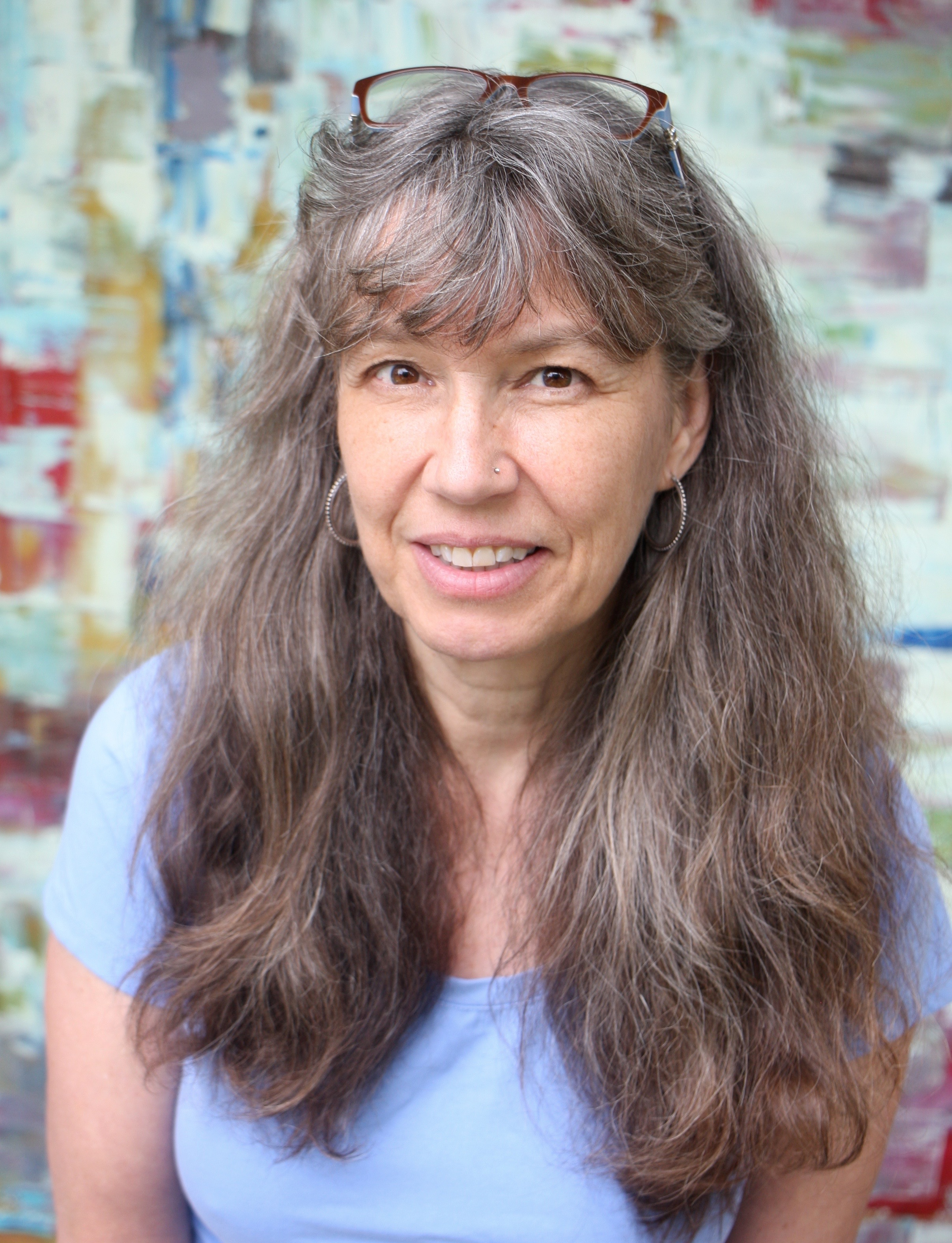
- Bigler in 2019
- Occupation: Professor of Psychology

Academic background
- Education: Oberlin College (B.A.); Pennsylvania State University (Ph.D.)

Academic work
- Institutions: University of Texas at Austin
- Doctoral students: Christia Brown

Rebecca Bigler is a developmental psychologist known for research on social stereotyping (based on gender or race), prejudice, and children's perceptions of discrimination. Bigler is Professor of Psychology at the University of Texas at Austin.

Bigler advocates for use of gender-neutral language and endorses use of ze as a personal pronoun to replace he/she and hir to replace his/her. Bigler is a recognized teacher of psychology and recipient of numerous teaching awards from the University of Texas at Austin, including the Raymond Dickson Centennial Endowed Teaching Fellowship award in 2011. Bigler is well known as an advocate against single-sex education. They argue that segregation based on sex or any other social characteristic is likely to increase prejudice based on that characteristic.

== Biography ==
Bigler received a B.A. degree at Oberlin College in 1986. They attended graduate school at Pennsylvania State University where they began conducting research on gender schemata and internalized sexualization under the supervision of Lynn Liben. Bigler obtained a master's degree in 1988 and a Ph.D. in Developmental Psychology in 1991. With Liben, Bigler conducted widely cited research on gender differentiation in development, social stereotyping and prejudice. Liben and Bigler also co-edited the 2014 volume The Role of Gender in Educational Contexts and Outcomes.

Bigler joined the faculty of the Department of Psychology at the University of Texas at Austin in 1991. Currently, Bigler is the executive director of the American Council for Coeducational Schooling.

== Research ==
Bigler's research program has focuses on the development of stereotyped attitudes associated with gender and race/ethnicity. They are known for work highlighting the impact of gender stereotypes on children's development, especially for girls. Bigler aims to discover how and when children develop stereotyped views, and what external and internal observations impact children and their thinking. Bigler and their former student Sarah McKenney express concerns about girls' limited choices in Halloween costumes, and the tendency for girls' clothing and toys to promote the value of "being hot and sexy." Their research has shown that adolescent girls who internalize beliefs about the importance of being sexually attractive to boys show increased rates of body surveillance and body shaming and perform worse in school and on standardized test scores than girls who score low on such beliefs. From a young age, girls may internalize gender stereotypes about how girls should act and behave, including how they should look and the types of clothes they should wear. Girls who internalize the beliefs that they must be attractive to men may spend more time on makeup and focus less on academics.

Other research has examined the formation of intergroup attitudes among students in school settings. Bigler speaks strongly about how models provided to children contribute to social stereotyping and prejudice among children as they grow up. To Bigler, saying "Good morning boys and girls" is similar to saying "Good morning blacks and whites" as it draws attention to social categories that result in children viewing themselves and others differently. In a widely cited study, Bigler examined gender stereotyping in relation to classroom practices. In some classes, the teacher referred to students by gender ("boys" vs. "girls") while, in others classes, the teacher referred to mixed gender groups according to t-shirt colors ("red" or blue"). Teachers were explicitly instructed not to favor or show preference to one group of children over the other. After four weeks, children in classes where they were referred to as "boys and girls" showed increased gender stereotyping, whereas no change was observed in classes that used t-shirt colors to distinguish groups. Teachers may unknowingly impose gender stereotypes upon their pupils when they refer children as boys and girls. Such language appears to create tensions in the classroom that impact how children view and treat one another.

== Selected publications ==
- Bigler, R. S. (1995). The role of classification skill in moderating environmental influences on children's gender stereotyping: A study of the functional use of gender in the classroom. Child Development, 66(4), 1072–1087.
- Bigler, R. S., Jones, L. C., & Lobliner, D. B. (1997). Social categorization and the formation of intergroup attitudes in children. Child Development, 68(3), 530–543.
- Bigler, R. S., & Liben, L. S. (2007). Developmental intergroup theory: Explaining and reducing children's social stereotyping and prejudice. Current Directions in Psychological Science, 16(3), 162–166.
- Hyde, J. S., Bigler, R. S., Joel, D., Tate, C. C., & van Anders, S. M. (2018). The future of sex and gender in psychology: Five challenges to the gender binary. American Psychologist. https://dx.doi.org/10.1037/amp0000307
- Liben, L. S., & Bigler, R. S. (2002). The developmental course of gender differentiation: Conceptualizing, measuring, and evaluating constructs and pathways. Monographs of the society for research in child development, i-183.
- Signaler, M. L., Bigler, R. S., & Liben, L. S. (1993). Developmental differences in children′ s gender schemata about others: A meta-analytic review. Developmental Review, 13(2), 147–183.
