= Juan Pascual-Leone =

Developmental psychologist

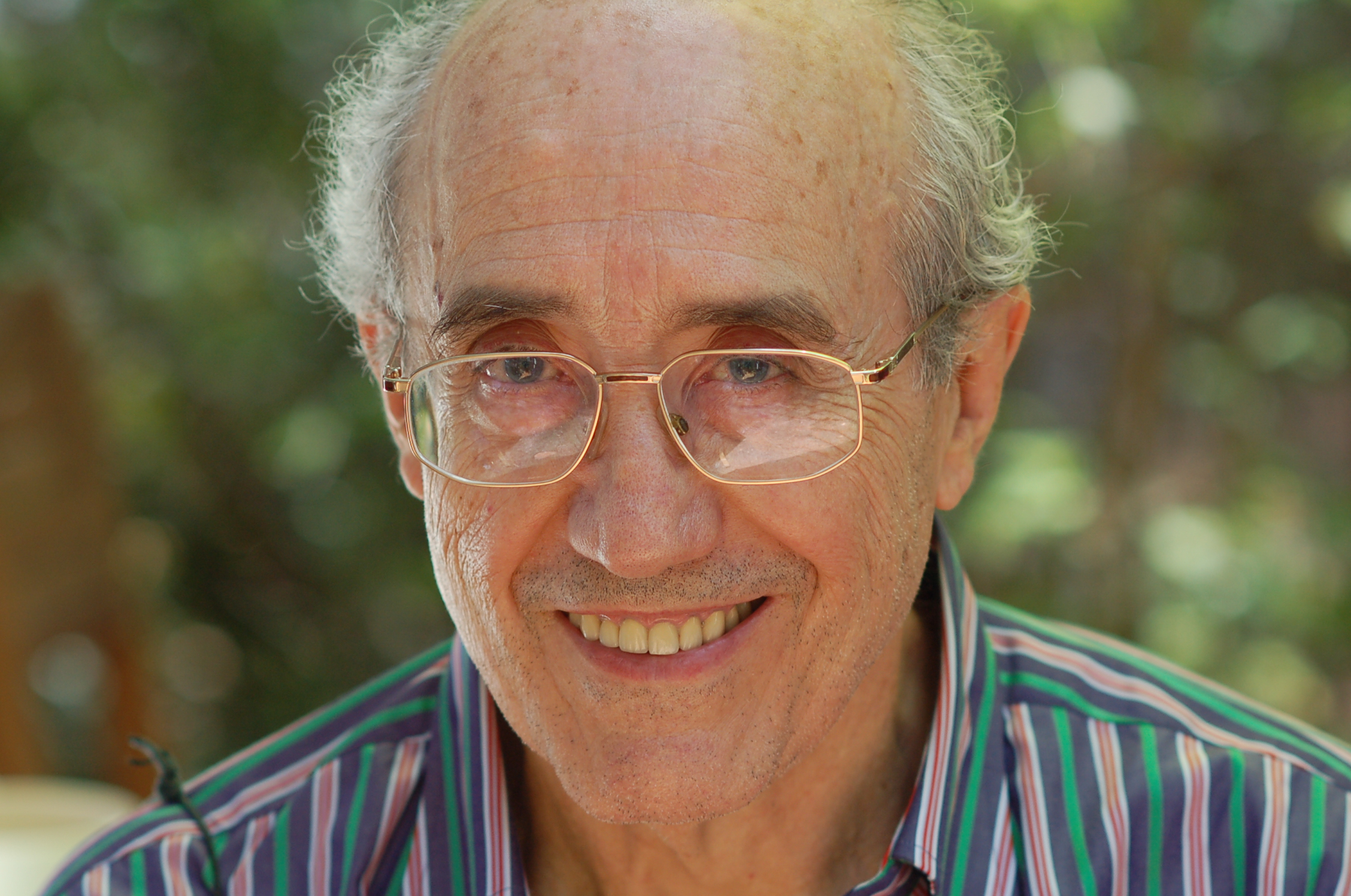
- Born: 1933 (age 92–93); Valencia, Spain
- Known for: neo-Piagetian approach to cognitive development; Theory of Constructive Operators (TCO)
- Scientific career
- Fields: Cognitive Developmental Psychology and Developmental Neuropsychology
- Workplaces: York University
- Thesis: Cognitive development and cognitive style: A general psychological integration. (1969)
- Doctoral advisor: Jean Piaget
- Other academic advisors: Herman Witkin
- Website: https://psyc.info.yorku.ca/health-profiles/index.php?dept=&mid=2764

Juan Pascual-Leone (born 1933 in Spain) is a developmental psychologist and founder of the neo-Piagetian approach to cognitive development. He introduced this term into the literature and put forward key predictions about developmental growth of mental attention and working memory.

Pascual-Leone pioneered descriptions of developmental cognitive growth from an organismic perspective, i.e. "from within" the subjects' task processing. He contrasts this "metasubjective" perspective with the external observer's perspective taken in much psychological research and theory. His modeling of processing involves mental or metasubjective task-analysis, which yields estimates of task complexity from the subject's perspective. Using this method he clarified distinctions between learning (including the learning of executive functions), maturational-developmental processes, and working memory, studying their interrelationships from within the subject's processing.

The Theory of Constructive Operators (TCO), is his general causal model of cognitive development, framed in terms of organismic operators, schemes, and principles.

== Education ==
Pascual-Leone studied medicine at the University of Valencia and specialized in psychiatry and neurology in Santander, on the north coast of Spain, and in Paris. His background as a medical doctor and neuropsychiatrist, and his experience studying psychology with Jean Piaget, contributed to a sophisticated understanding of Piaget's theory. The TCO is an expansion and reformulation that integrates the ideas of, among others, his mentors Jean Piaget and Herman Witkin.

=== Under the Supervision of Piaget ===
In 1963–69, Pascual-Leone studied psychology at the University of Geneva, Switzerland, where, in 1964, he obtained his M.A. (Licence) in Experimental Child Development, and in 1969, his Ph.D. in psychology. Here, he was under the direct supervision of Jean Piaget (1896–1980), at the peak of his fame as child psychologist and constructivist-development researcher, whom he refers to as "my intellectual father in Psychology". As one of the later graduate students of Piaget, he obtained first-hand knowledge of Piaget's theory, collaborating in Piaget's book on mental image. He was one of the first of Piaget's students to explicitly highlight shortcomings of the master's theory.

=== Under the Supervision of Witkin ===
Pascual-Leone also studied under the American psychologist Herman Witkin (1916–1979). Witkin—a student of Max Wertheimer, a founder of Gestalt Psychology—conducted research on individual differences (cognitive styles) in cognitive and perceptional psychology as well as personality development; his focus was on psycho-social processes and cognitive differentiation. Witkin was an innovator who pioneered, from an organismic perspective, theories of cognitive styles, psychological differentiation, and learning styles.

Pascual-Leone defended his doctoral thesis in psychology in Geneva, with Piaget and Witkin as supervisors. In 1964–65, Pascual-Leone did research at Witkin's laboratory at the State University of New York, Downstate Medical Center. This final doctoral research was done under Witkin's sponsorship and supervision with the help of a postdoctoral fellowship from the Foundations Fund for Research in Psychiatry. Working with Witkin influenced Pascual-Leone's later TCO theory, which was more process-analytical and developmental but in line with Witkin's theory.

== Early research into cognitive development ==
Pascual-Leone's now-classic cognitive developmental research in the 1960s led to his seminal paper in 1970, one of the 500 most cited papers in the field of psychology. In this work he proposed a mathematical model of endogenous mental-attention and explained how it develops as a function of chronological age in normal children. His findings demonstrated for the first time that, when measured behaviorally, children's mental-attentional capacity increases after the age of three, by one symbol-processing unit every other year until it reaches seven units at 15–16 years. Seven units, according to Miller and Pascual-Leone, is the maximum-capacity of mental/executive attention in adults (although adults may habitually apply about 5 units of this capacity). Pascual-Leone's mental-attention model was the first to quantify the effective complexity of processing stages in human development. Many of his ideas challenged the scientific establishment at the time. Commenting on this work, Barrouillet and Gaillard wrote: "Neo-Piagetian theories have the potential to account for most of the learning difficulties and developmental disorders by cumulating the strength of the functionalist and the structuralist approaches."

=== Quantifying levels of cognitive development ===
Pascual-Leone analyzed developmental data investigating the tasks' processing complexity. He assessed complexity by modeling the number of essential operators, relations, or schemes that children must simultaneously hold in mind to produce performance. In 1963, he inferred with his analyses that there is a maximum mental demand that each child's age group can cope with – the characteristic mental (M-) power of each developmental stage-level. Only when the growth of mental power in a child is equal to or larger than the task's mental demand, can the child reliably solve a task. Today this information is well recognized; but in the nineteen seventies and eighties the idea was controversial. Pascual-Leone was the first to claim, via his task analyses, that the true organismic stages were in fact the sub-stages of Piaget. Recently Arsalidou, Pascual-Leone, Johnson, Morris, and Taylor have produced data suggesting that these levels of functioning may be expressed in adults by incrementation of brain activity in the executive (prefrontal lobes, etc.) network.

== Later work ==
In later years, Pascual-Leone's scientific work received increased recognition. His theory has been validated in his laboratory and by independent researchers, who, often without explicit reference to Pascual-Leone, have supported his original predictions and subsequent results, either using his tasks or with methods that converge with his.

The impact of Pascual-Leone's work can be seen in three scholarly controversies: (1) the debate over Trabasso's critique of Pascual-Leone's 1970 paper; (2) the multi-author discussion of Kemps, De Rammelaere, and Desmet comparing Pascual-Leone's model of mental attention with Baddeley's model of working memory; and (3) the discussion of Demetriou, Spanoudis, and Shayer's study on speed of processing, working memory, and general intelligence. A further indicator of the interest in Pascual-Leone's work is evidenced by various published interviews.

With Janice M. Johnson, Pascual-Leone has written a book presenting his theory and data supporting it, as well as his method of mental task analysis. He has published numerous articles and chapters (some of which can be found in ResearchGate). In 2006, he received an honorary doctorate from the University of Cyprus and in 2018 was made a Fellow of the Association for Psychological Science.

=== Cognitive styles ===
Pascual-Leone was among the earlier developmental researchers to emphasize the role of cognitive styles (e.g., field-dependence-independence, adaptive flexibility) and individual differences in cognitive development; and he was the first to quantify mental-attention capacity throughout development. His research on children's and adults' mental-attentional capacity and on cognitive styles (which affect the person's propensity to experience and cope with misleading/conflicting situations versus facilitating situations), as well as his metasubjective ("from within") analysis, has opened up new perspectives for understanding cognitive processes; and has helped to clarify causal-developmental relations between affect/motivation, cognition, individual differences, and complex/conceptual processes.

Pascual-Leone's work can be classified under four diverse categories: (1) Dialectical constructivist epistemology, the theory of constructive operators, a model for quantifying mental/executive attention, and process task analysis; (2) Educational domains: math, visuospatial, logic, language, science education, giftedness; (3) Individual differences, cognitive styles, developmental neuropsychology, and brain semantics; and (4) Mental health: psychotherapy, meditation, and human change.

Regarding his innovative work on individual differences as sources of difficulty/conflict in Piagetian tasks, Case and Edelstein have written:

"The nature of this conflict, Pascual-Leone asserted, is the same as the conflict elicited by Witkin's classic embedded figures test […] As a consequence, the pathways by which a subject must arrive at the solution to the two sorts of different tasks (field misleading and field facilitating) is different. For this reason Pascual-Leone predicted that field-dependent subjects would show a different developmental profile from field-independent subjects in any battery in which both types of developmental task are administered […] Pascual-Leone was able to predict the pattern of individual differences across a remarkably broad variety of Piagetian and psychometric tasks […] In the general theoretical system that he evolved, what was seen as universal about development was its inexorable move towards greater complexity, as a result of biennial increases in mental power (M power). What was seen as individual about development were the particular situations to which different children were sensitive, and the particular styles or strategies that they evolved for dealing with these situations. Field independence was just one of the styles Pascual-Leone studied."

== The Theory of Constructive Operators (TCO) ==
Pascual-Leone proposed the Theory of Constructive Operators (TCO) – an organismic cognitive-developmental theory that is neuropsychologically interpretable in terms of brain processes. He was the first to quantify cognitive-processing limitations in novel problem-solving situations and at different stages of development, and was the first to use a formal, explicit method of process-task analysis to estimate the mental-attention demands of tasks.

This theory explains human psychological functioning as the product of the dynamic combination of schemes (the brain's "software" – information/action bearing processes, embodied by cell assemblies or networks) and "hidden hardware" operators of the brain. Hidden operators acting on schemes generate thoughts, actions, and learning. They are brain-resource mechanisms that regulate functioning of (and can change) schemes. Piaget left these resources unexplained and often referred to them as principles like "regulations", "accommodation", and "equilibration". Operators intervene in all neuropsychological processes that are emergent and not automatized or overlearned. They include M-operator (mental-attention capacity, which explains the innate-developmental basis of working memory); I-operator (inhibition mechanism causing attentional interruption); L-operator (i.e., logical- structural learning capability); C-learning (content-learning capability); F-operator (i.e., the neo-Gestaltist "field effects", or "minimum principle", or "S-R compatibility"); etc. Table 1 shows different operators of the TCO and some of their key brain regions.

Pascual-Leone's model of mental attention includes activation and inhibition processes. The activation component (M-capacity) boosts information schemes necessary for task performance. M-operator capacity is measured in terms of the maximum number of mental schemes (not strongly activated by the input, learning, or by strong affects) that can be boosted into working memory (i.e., mental focus or attentional centration) at any one time. The method of M-measurement presents task items that vary systematically in demand for mental attention. In this way an individual's M-capacity can be measured, in terms of the amount of attentional demand they can handle. By refining the method and accumulating research evidence, Pascual-Leone reached interval scales of measurement of this mental-attentional load. Pascual-Leone also highlighted brain regions that sub-serve cognitive processes linked to his theoretical constructs, offering a tentative chronological map of their evolution.

M-capacity is the key maturational causal factor of working memory. Working memory refers to all the schemes in a person's repertoire that are sufficiently activated (irrespective of the cause) to co-determine the ongoing process of representation or performance. There are other causes of scheme activation (including affects/emotions, overlearning/automatization, field factors); for this reason the size of working memory is often larger than the size of M-centration.

=== Table 1. Some of TCO's hidden operators listed in a plausible order of evolutionary emergence ===
Operator	Description	Main Brain Region
A	Set of affective processes that intervene in motivation and attentive arousal.	Brain stem, hypothalamus, extended amygdala, limbic system
C	Both the process of content learning and the schemes derived from associative content learning.	Thalamus; Broadmann primary & secondary areas
F(SOP)	The field operator, which acts as a binding mechanism in the brain and brings closure to mental representations in a neoGestaltist manner. It often functions intertwined with the principle of Schemes' Overdetermination of Performance (SOP)	All areas
LC	The process of automatized logical-structural learning derived from C-learning through over-practice and automatization.	Right hemisphere (RH)
T	Temporarily and effortlessly collates sequences of figurative schemes, thus facilitating the coordination that constitutes distal objects.	Hippocampal complex. Occipito-temporal cortex
S	Effortlessly coordinates relations of coexistence among activated schemes, during operative activity (praxis). Thereby it facilitates emergence of spatial schemes or schemas.	Hippocampal complex. Occipito-parietal cortex
LA, LB	Logical-structural learning primed by strong affects, or by preferences of the personal-social being – including his/her emotions.	Limbic system, orbito & medial prefrontal, inferotemporal, medial parietal cortex
I	The attentional interrupt, which corresponds to the power of central active inhibition of unwanted schemes activated in the situation.	Prefrontal, RH-medial & dorsolateral cortex. Basal ganglia.Thalamus
M	Mental attentional capacity of the individual.	Prefrontal, lateral & dorsolateral cortex. Basal ganglia. Thalamus.
LM	Logical-structural learning caused by the effortful use of mental attentional capacity	Left hemisphere tertiary, polymodal areas
E	Executive schemes in the person's repertoire, for the task at hand.	Prefrontal, lateral, dorsolateral, etc. frontopolar areas

== Current work ==
Pascual-Leone is now professor emeritus and senior scholar at York University, Toronto, where he continues to have an active laboratory. He has completed with Dr. Janice Johnson a longitudinal study on development of mental attentional capacity. With Dr. Marie Arsalidou he continues research on mental-attention measurement that is applicable across content domains (Color-Matching Task, Letter-Matching Task, Number Matching Task, etc.). These tasks are being compared with established mental-capacity tasks (such as Figural Intersections Task (FIT)) and are related to language (e.g., bilingualism) and other domains. They are also investigating brain correlates of the tasks in children and adults by using functional magnetic resonance imaging (fMRI). In a different direction, Pascual-Leone's laboratory is studying how to energize a person's functional mental attention (not his/her maturational capacity or reserve) by using meditation methods. His lab has previously shown that regular practice of Tai Chi increases the functional level of mental attention. A recently completed book gives an overview of the TCO and its applications.
