= Christia Brown =

American psychologist and author

- Education: Belmont University (B.S.); University of Texas at Austin (M.A., Ph.D.)
- Scientific career
- Fields: Developmental and social psychology, gender studies, social inequality
- Workplaces: University of California, Los Angeles; University of Kentucky College of Arts and Sciences
- Thesis: Children’s Perceptions of Discrimination: Antecedents and Consequences (2003)
- Doctoral advisor: Rebecca Bigler

Christia Spears Brown is an American psychologist and author. She is a professor of psychology and Dean of the College of Arts, Humanities, and Social Sciences at University of Maryland Baltimore County. Brown is the author of several books. Her research interests include gender stereotypes, children and adolescents perception of gender and ethnic discrimination, gender and ethnic identity development, and social inequality.

== Education ==
Brown earned a B.S., magna cum laude, in psychology at Belmont University in 1996. She earned an M.A. (2000) and Ph.D. (2003) in developmental psychology with a minor in statistics from University of Texas at Austin. Her dissertation was titled Children’s Perceptions of Discrimination: Antecedents and Consequences. Brown's doctoral advisor was Rebecca Bigler.

== Career ==
In 2003, Brown was an instructor in the department of psychology at Southwestern University. From 2003 to 2007, she was an assistant professor in the department of psychology at University of California, Los Angeles. Brown joined University of Kentucky College of Arts and Sciences (UK) in 2007 as an assistant professor. She became an associate professor in 2011 and is currently a professor of developmental psychology and Associate Dean of Diversity, Equity, and Inclusion. In 2016, she became the founding director of the UK Center for Equality and Social Justice.

From 2017 to 2019, Brown was chair of the Society for Research in Child Development Equity and Justice Committee.

=== Research ===
Brown researches gender stereotypes, children and adolescents perception of gender and ethnic discrimination, gender and ethnic identity development, and social inequality. Her studies have included examining the perceptions of discrimination by authority figures such as coaches and teachers and sexual harassment of girls. Brown investigates discrimination of immigrant children and parents in studies funded by the Foundation for Child Development and the UK Center for Poverty Research. She is conducting a multi-site study under Rebecca Bigler that exams children's understanding of the relationships between race, poverty, politics, and gender.

== Selected works ==
=== Books ===
- Brown, Christia Spears (2021). Unraveling Bias: How Prejudice Has Shaped Children for a Generation and Why It is Time to Break the Cycle. BenBella. ISBN 9781953295552.
- Brown, Christia Spears (2014). Parenting Beyond Pink & Blue: How to Raise Your Kids Free of Gender Stereotypes. Potter/Ten Speed/Harmony/Rodale. ISBN 9781607745037.
- Rutland, Adam; Nesdale, Drew; Brown, Christia Spears (2017). The Wiley Handbook of Group Processes in Children and Adolescents. John Wiley & Sons. ISBN 9781118773130.
- Brown, Christia Spears (2017). Discrimination in Childhood and Adolescence: A Developmental Intergroup Approach. Psychology Press. ISBN 9781351803489.
