= Helen L. Koch =

American psychologist

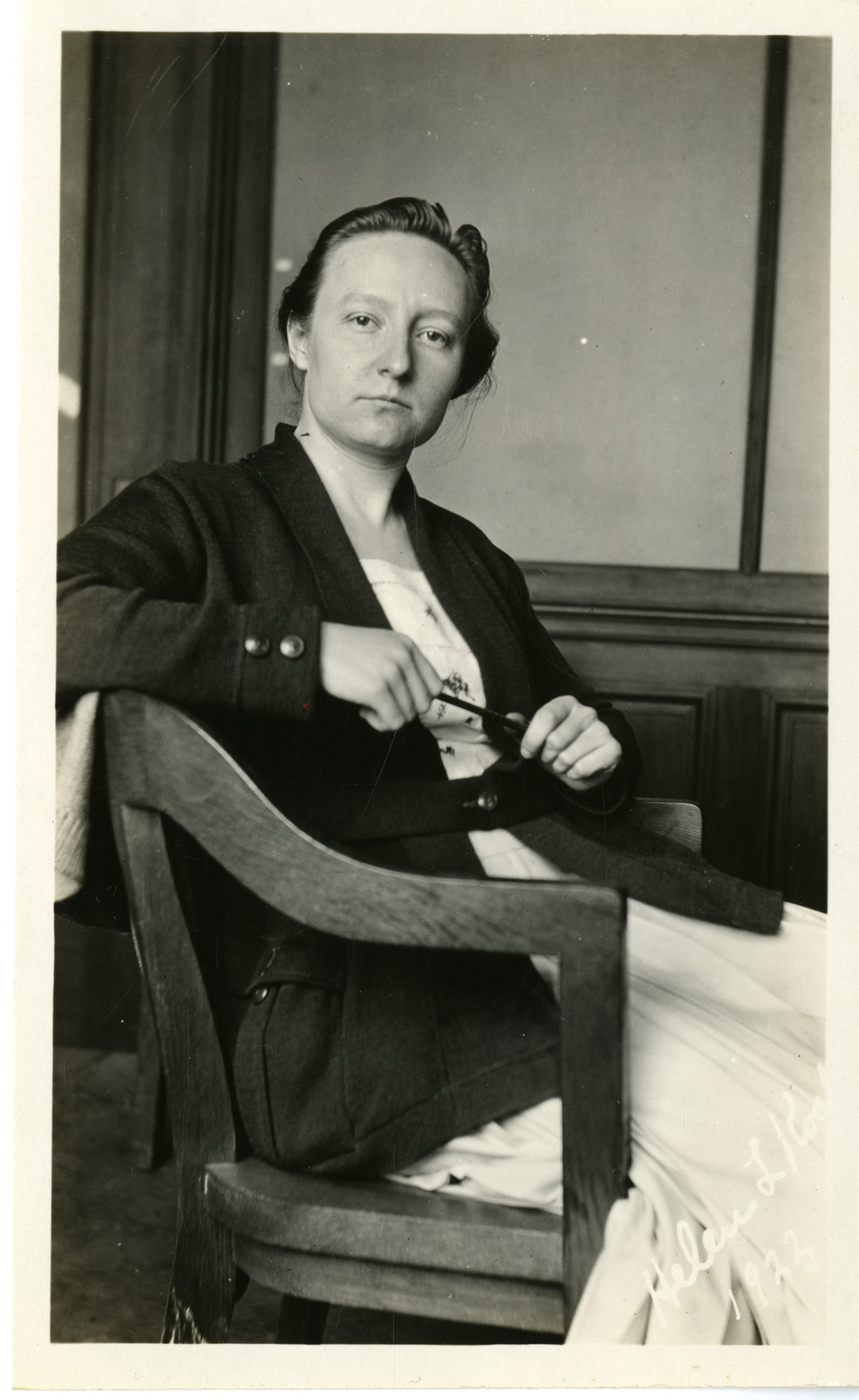
- Koch in 1922
- Born: August 26, 1895; Blue Island, Illinois
- Died: July 14, 1977 (aged 81); Chicago, Illinois
- Known for: Studies of twin development
- Scientific career
- Fields: Developmental psychology
- Institutions: University of Texas; University of Chicago

Helen Lois Koch (August 26, 1895 – July 14, 1977) was an American developmental psychologist and a faculty member at the University of Texas at Austin and the University of Chicago. Koch developed nursery school teacher training programs during World War II and she researched the differences between sets of fraternal twins, identical twins and non-twin siblings.

A graduate of the University of Chicago, Koch was credited with research work that improved the accuracy of investigations into sibling order. She was the co-winner of the first G. Stanley Hall Award for Distinguished Contribution to Developmental Psychology in 1967 (later named Division 7). She helped to found Delta Kappa Gamma, a professional society for women educators.

== Early life ==
Born in Blue Island, Illinois, Koch had an interest in the piano from the age of eight, and she continued to play through her college years. She attended the University of Chicago, where she pursued psychology studies with a minor in German. She earned an undergraduate degree (1918) and a Ph.D. (1921) at the university.

== Teaching career ==
In 1922, Koch went to the University of Texas to teach psychology. There she became associated with A. Caswell Ellis, who headed the university's program in the philosophy of education. In 1928, she was named a full professor at Texas. The next year, Ellis took a position at Western Reserve University as director of its adult education department. Koch considered following Ellis, but she accepted a post as an associate professor at the University of Chicago because she had family in the area.

When Koch joined the University of Chicago faculty, courses in child care, preschool education and developmental psychology were taught in the home economics department, and Koch taught the child development courses. She also had responsibility over nursery school education, and she became the director of the University Cooperative Nursery School (later known as the University of Chicago Nursery School). During World War II, Koch developed nursery school teacher training programs to meet the demands of war nurseries. By the late 1940s, Koch was released from her nursery school obligations so that she could focus on research.

Psychologist Judith Torney-Purta, a graduate student at the University of Chicago in the 1960s, recalled Koch's unique teaching style, saying, "I learned about Piagetian theory from Helen Koch, who stood ramrod straight and lectured without notes for 50 minutes."

== Research work ==
In the mid-1950s, Koch examined the effects of sibling order, and she defined several variables that had to be held constant in order to minimize error in this type of research. Child development literature would later note that Koch's work "refined research in the area of sibship variables by a precision of at least one significant figure." She also focused on the differences between twins and non-twins, and between identical and fraternal twins. In a large study of five- and six-year-old children, she found that identical twins were similar to fraternal twins and matched pairs of non-twin siblings in almost all of the measured variables.

In 1966, Koch authored a book based on her work, Twins and Twin Relations. Geneticist Steven G. Vandenberg said that the book was "an unexpected boost for heredity", because previous researchers had been working under the untested assumption that fraternal and identical twins were interchangeable for the purposes of twin developmental studies. However, Vanderburg criticized Koch's work because she did not use blood typing to definitively determine whether her subjects were fraternal or identical twins.

Koch later said that the nature versus nurture debates raised questions that were not usually feasible to answer. For example, even in the case of identical twins who were thought to share the same environment from fetal life, one twin may have had an unrecognized developmental advantage because of the position of the fetuses. In other cases, she said that some fraternal twins seem much more physically and emotionally similar than some identical twins.

== Awards and service ==
In 1967, Koch was the co-winner (with Harold M. Skeels) of the first G. Stanley Hall Award for Distinguished Contribution to Developmental Psychology, presented by Division 7 of the American Psychological Association.

Koch was one of the founders of the Delta Kappa Gamma sorority for women educators when she taught at Texas. After moving to the University of Chicago, she helped to start a chapter there.

== Later life ==
In a 1971 interview, a retired Koch said that the situation for women in academia had improved since her days as a student and early-career academic. "I was in school during suffrage time. I even did a little parading and I don't think much of parades," she said. "I don't believe in name-calling and rock-throwing but sometimes it takes vigorous action of organized women to get something accomplished... it takes a long time to realize how persistent you must be to get what you're after."

Koch died in Chicago in 1977.
