= Society for the Study of Human Development =

American learned society

The Society for the Study of Human Development (SSHD) is a professional society formed by a group of scholars from multiple disciplines (e.g., medicine, biology, psychology, sociology, economics, and history). The central focus of SSHD is to provide an organization that moves beyond age-segmented scholarly organizations to take an integrative, interdisciplinary approach to ages/stages across the life span, generational and ecological contexts of human development, and research and applications to human development policies and programs. It was founded in 1998 when a group of scholars met at the Radcliffe Institute for Advanced Study. Its first meeting was held in November 1999. The current president of the society is Carolyn Aldwin (Oregon State University), and the president-elect is Lynn S. Liben (The Pennsylvania State University). The society's official journal is Research in Human Development.

== Past presidents ==
Former presidents of the SSHD include:

- David Henry Feldman (Tufts University)
- Kristine Ajrouch (Eastern Michigan University)
- Willis Overton (Temple University)
- Cynthia García Coll (Brown University/University of Puerto Rico)
- Lawrence Schiamberg (Michigan State University)
- Toni Antonucci (University of Michigan)
- Susan Whitbourne (University of Massachusetts)
- Jacquelyn James (Boston College)
- Richard M. Lerner (Tufts University)
