= William Kessen =

American psychologist, educator, and historian

- Born: January 18, 1925
- Died: February 13, 1999 (aged 74)

William Kessen (January 18, 1925 – February 13, 1999) was an American psychologist, educator, and historian of science. He was Eugene Higgins Professor of Psychology and Professor of Pediatrics at Yale University.
