= Eleanor Maccoby =

American psychologist

Eleanor Emmons Maccoby
- Born: Eleanor Emmons; May 15, 1917; Tacoma, Washington, U.S.
- Died: December 11, 2018 (aged 101); Palo Alto, California, U.S.
- Education: PhD, University of Michigan, (1950) MA, University of Michigan, (1949) BA, University of Washington, (1939)
- Organization(s): Stanford University, (1958–2018) Harvard University, (1950–1957)

Eleanor Emmons Maccoby (May 15, 1917 – December 11, 2018) was an American psychologist who was most recognized for her research and scholarly contributions to the fields of gender studies and developmental psychology. Throughout her career she studied sex differences, gender development, parent-child relations, child development, and social development from the child perspective.

Maccoby earned her M.A and Ph.D. from the University of Michigan where she worked under B. F. Skinner. She also did her dissertation research in Skinner's Harvard laboratory. Maccoby continued her psychology career at Stanford University, where she served as a professor, member and chair of the department of psychology and conducted various research. This resulted in multiple publications with her most recognized publication being her book, The Development of Sex Differences (1966). Maccoby has received numerous awards for her work; however, in 2000 Maccoby was named the first-ever recipient of an award named in her honor, The Maccoby Award. The American Psychological Association listed Maccoby as 70 out of 100 for the most eminent psychologists of the 20th century.

== Biography ==
Eleanor Emmons was born on May 15, 1917. She was the second oldest of four daughters born to Eugene and Viva Emmons. Maccoby's mother was a singer/musician and her father owned a small business in Tacoma, Washington.

Her family's beliefs and way of life were unusual for that time period. They were vegetarians, interested in eastern thought and religious doctrines which included reincarnation, astrology, and occult phenomena.

In 1934 she moved to Portland, Oregon, where she attended Reed College for two years. She then moved to Seattle, Washington and attended the University of Washington, where she met her husband, Nathan Maccoby. They courted for one year then married in 1938. Nathan was a psychology graduate student. In 1940, Eleanor moved with her husband to Washington, D.C., where he had a job at the US Civil Service Commission. They remained in Washington, D.C. till 1947 when they moved to Michigan.

Eleanor Maccoby earned her bachelor's degree in 1939 from the University of Washington. She earned her master's degree in 1949 and her doctorate degree in 1950 from the University of Michigan.

Eleanor and Nathan adopted three children. Their first child, Janice Maccoby, was adopted in 1952. Four years later they adopted their second child, Sarah Maccoby, and soon after their third child, Mark Maccoby. Eleanor Macoby assumed most of the unpaid work of the family, working in her paid employment part-time, postponing publishing anything for five to six years during this time so she could spend more time with her children.

In 1958, Eleanor and Nathan were offered jobs at Stanford University. Nathan worked in the Communications Department and Eleanor worked in the Psychology Department teaching child psychology.

Maccoby considered herself a feminist, and at Stanford she met Carol Nagy Jacklin, who also was involved in the feminist movement for front issues that were rising due to the Vietnam War. Maccoby and Jacklin started to work on studies involving inequality between men and women. This led to research involving differences and similarities in boys and girls, which soon led into what Maccoby became renowned for.

In 1992, Eleanor's husband, Nathan, died of a heart attack at the age of 80. They were married for 54 years and had five grandchildren.

At age 99, Maccoby wrote a book-length account of her life. She turned 100 in May 2017 and died at the age of 101 on December 11, 2018.

== Educational and vocational history ==
After completing her secondary education, Maccoby attended Reed College for two years, where she was exposed to behaviorist psychology. Maccoby then transferred to the University of Washington where she received her B.A. (1939).

While attending the University of Washington she majored in psychology and studied with Edwin Guthrie. While studying with Guthrie, Maccoby was intrigued by his contiguity-based stimulus-response learning theory. She earned her M.A. from the University of Michigan in 1949. The end of the World War II led to vast advancements in medical research as well as a new understanding of the importance of mental health and developmental psychology. Eleanor E. Maccoby started her career in child development after World War II ended by working in Boston before completing her PhD at the University of Michigan.

Maccoby was given the opportunity to work with B.F. Skinner. Maccoby had completed all the requirements for her PhD except the dissertation. B.F. Skinner offered to let Maccoby use his automated data recording equipment in his laboratory at Harvard University. She then completed her dissertation research on an operant conditioning study involving pigeons. Within the following year, Maccoby was able to earn her PhD from the University of Michigan (1950).

Completing her dissertation at Harvard University opened many career and research opportunities for Maccoby. Maccoby served as a professor and researcher at Harvard University from 1950 to 1957. Maccoby's most known research while at Harvard University was a research study that resulted in the book, Patterns of Child-Rearing (Sears, Maccoby, & Levin, 1957). A coworker, Robert Sears was in the process of planning a study of socialization practices and their relation to personality development in young children and offered Maccoby to assist with the study.

Maccoby took on the role of managing the portion of the study that involved interviewing the mothers concerning their child-rearing practices; many believe this is where she realized her interest in sex differences, parental responsibilities, and child development. At Harvard, she taught child psychology and published her research in areas such as social behavior in infants and child-rearing. She conducted other research during her time at Harvard University, which include: a set of studies on selective attention to viewer-relevant content in films, a study of the impact of television on children's use of time, a study of the community control of juvenile delinquency, and a study of first time voters and the family dynamics that led young people adopting or not adopting their parents' voting preferences. Maccoby also coedited the third edition of Readings in Social Psychology during her time at Harvard University.

After graduating from the University of Michigan, Maccoby had taken on a position at Harvard University in Massachusetts. Although unknown to most people, both Eleanor and her husband, Nathan were offered positions in the psychology department at Stanford University. In order to obey by the anti-nepotism rules that had come into consideration, Nathan had taken a job in the Communications Department at Stanford while Eleanor took the position within the Psychology Department. While Eleanor was at Stanford, she was asked if she would be able to fill a teaching position in child psychology. Eleanor Maccoby was excited about her offer and had the chance to be able to split her time between teaching and balancing the three new children that she and her husband had adopted.

In 1958, Maccoby and her husband were offered faculty positions at Stanford University. Her research has taken multiple different approaches throughout her career at Stanford University. In 1974, Maccoby and her colleague Jacklin published their research on sex differences in Maccoby's most well known book, The Psychology of Sex Differences. In 1980, Maccoby began a large-scale longitudinal study evaluating parent-child relationships before, during, and after parental divorce; since 1980, Maccoby has published her book, The Two Sexes, in 1998 and has continued working towards increasing the knowledge and understanding of child development and sex differences. Maccoby is credited to having well over one hundred publications, making her one of the most influential child development/social psychologists.

Maccoby is best known for her research in developmental psychology, her research on gender and sex roles, studies on selective attention, investigations into the impact of divorce on children and was the first woman to chair the Stanford Psychology Department. Eleanor had begun to feel as if her gender was impacting her ability to excel at Harvard which had then turned her to taking the position at Stanford University. Maccoby had always identified as a feminist, but the feminist issues were not always an issue. Until a group of student protesters had publicly announced the salaries of faculty members, which showed Maccoby to be one of the lowest paid faculty on campus. Some of her growth occurred through her participation in sexual harassment issues that were taking place on campus. More of the development had occurred through working side by side with Carol Jacklin who was her post-doctoral student.

Together, they worked on a parent-child interaction project. This project quickly became a topic for debate due to the psychological literature that was being used on the differences between women and men. Both Maccoby and Jacklin had decided to do a systematic review of the literature on gender differences. In asking around, they found that most of these studies had found no gender differences, but the researchers had been unable to publish these findings. Because of the findings, both Maccoby and Jacklin made the executive decision to include as many unpublished studies they could find in an attempt to agree with the publication bias. The message that Maccoby and Jacklin had been trying to convey became well known and as feminist scholars during the time were extremely concerned with the evidence of the similarities men and women have. The finished book known as, The Psychology of Sex Differences is now considered to be a classic piece and had been cited more than five thousand times.

Other work Maccoby completed at Stanford University consisted of organizing a yearlong faculty seminar on sex differences and edited the book that emerged from this seminar (The Development of Sex Differences, Maccoby, 1966). Maccoby also was involved in a Social Science Research Council that focused on socialization.

During the 1990s, Eleanor Maccoby had begun to center her focus and research on the impact that divorce has on children. The research on divorce on children had been a longitudinal investigation with looking into the effect that divorce had on families. This then prompted Maccoby to write two more books on the topic. The books include, Dividing the Child with the co-author Robert Mnookin and Adolescents After Divorce with co-authors Christy Buchanan and Sanford Dornbusch. One of her earliest publications was Patterns of Child Rearing published in 1957, which examined the parent-child relationship.

== Honors ==
Maccoby received several awards for her contributions to developmental psychology. She was elected president of the Western Psychological Association, president of Division 7 (Developmental Psychology) of the American Psychological Association from 1971 to 1972, and president of the Society for Research in Child Development from 1981 to 1983. From 1973 to 1976, she served as chair of the Psychology Department at Stanford, the first woman to do so.

She received the G. Stanley Hall Award for Distinguished Contributions to Developmental Psychology in 1982 from Division 7 of the APA and the American Psychological Foundation Lifetime Achievement Award in 1996. Division 7 of the APA, presents an award in her name known as the Maccoby Award.

On December 11, 2018 at the age of 101, Maccoby died of pneumonia.

Award	Year	Status
Barbara Kimball Browning Professorship at Stanford University	1979	Won
Stanford University Walter J. Gores Award for Excellence in Teaching	1981	Won
G. Stanley Hall Award of APA's Division of Developmental Psychology	1982	Won
American Educational Research Association Award for Distinguished Contributions in Educational Research	1984	Won
Society for Research in Child Development Award for Distinguished Scientific Contributions in Educational Research	1987	Won
APA Distinguished Scientific Contributions Award	1988	Won
National Academy of Sciences	1993	Won
Lifetime Achievement Award from the American Psychology Foundation	1996	Won
APA's Eleanor Maccoby Book Award in Developmental Psychology	2000	Won
