= Janet Werker =

Janet F. Werker
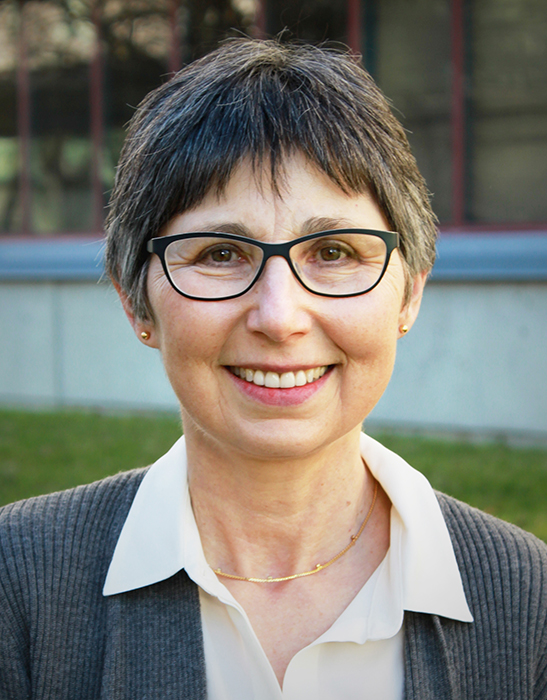
- Werker at the University of British Columbia (2015)

Janet F. Werker, OC FRSC is a researcher in the field of developmental psychology. She researches the foundations of monolingual and bilingual infant language acquisition in infants at the University of British Columbia's Infant Studies Centre. Her research has pioneered what are now accepted baselines in the field, showing that language learning begins in early infancy (even before birth) and is shaped by experience across the first year of life.

Werker concluded her undergraduate degree in psychology at Harvard University. She then went to graduate school and received her PhD in psychology at the University of British Columbia in 1982. She is a Canada Research Chair and Killam Professor at the University of British Columbia and is the recipient of the 2015 SSHRC Gold Medal. On 29 December 2017, Werker was named an Officer of the Order of Canada "for her internationally renowned contributions to our understanding of speech perception and language acquisition in infants."

In 2019, she was named one of four recipients of a William James Fellow Award from the Association for Psychological Science. In 2020, Werker was elected a member of the National Academy of Sciences.

== Research ==
Werker uses both behavioural and neuroimaging (particularly NIRS and ERP) methodology to identify maturational milestones that make it possible for children to begin the process of language acquisition. She has investigated how maternal depression and treatment for it can affect the timing of language development in children. Directions in future research include identifying whether cultural cues, such as ethnicity, influence bilingual children's ability to keep their two languages distinct, and how watching talking faces, in addition to hearing speech, influences acquisition. Her research on critical periods (CP's), which are developmental windows when a child's brain is more sensitive to environmental input, is one of her most significant achievements. She has also looked into how various antidepressants affect perceptual learning during pregnancy, particularly through gene expression.

== Biography ==
Werker completed her BA in psychology and social relations at Harvard University in 1974. She then went to the University of British Columbia for graduate work under Richard Tees where she received her PhD in 1982. In 1986, she returned to UBC as a faculty member after working as a psychology professor at Dalhousie University in Halifax, Nova Scotia. She attributes her interest in language acquisition to living in Vancouver, where most children grow up in bilingual households.

Werker has been named a Fellow of the Royal Society of Canada, and a Fellow of the American Association for the Advancement of Science, as well as of the American Academy of Arts and Sciences and Association for Psychological Science.

She is the founder and former co-director of the UBC Language Sciences and a member of the Early Development Research Group. This group includes six research centers who research on infant and child development in language and learning.

== Awards and honors ==
In 2024, Werker received the Benjamin Franklin Medal in Computer and Cognitive Science, an award among the world's oldest comprehensive science prizes. She received this because she was able to map how children pick up language sounds and how their developing brains undergo significant changes and adaptations.

In 2020, Janet Werker became a member of the National Academy of Sciences, which is deemed to be among the greatest honors a scientist may be awarded.

Also received by Werker was the William James Fellow Award, which she received in 2019 from the Association for Psychological Sciences.

During 2018, she earned the Killam Prize in the Social Sciences that was given to her by the Canada Council for the Arts.

An Officer of the Order of Canada was assigned to Werker in 2017, which honors exceptional accomplishment, community involvement, and national service.

She was the first professor at UBC to be granted the Social Sciences and Humanities Research Council's (SSHRC) Gold Medal Impact Award in 2015. This award is their highest one, given to those whose enduring leadership, commitment, and creative thinking have motivated both students and coworkers.

The University of British Columbia honored Werker with multiple awards. The most recent being the University Killam Professorship in 2016. In 2007, she received the Jacob Biely Research Prize, the Killam Research Prize in 1991, and in 1990 the Alumni Prize for Research in the Social Sciences.

== Selected publications ==
- D. Choi, L. Batterink, A. Black, K. Paller and J.F. Werker, "Prelingual infants discover statistical word patterns at similar rates as adults: Evidence from neural entrainment," Psych. Sci., vol. 31, no. 9, pp. 1161–73, 2020.
- A.G. Bruderer, D.K. Danielson, P. Kandhadai and J.F. Werker, "Sensorimotor influences on speech perception in infancy," PNAS, vol.112, no. 44, pp. 13531-6, 2015.
- J.F. Werker and T.K. Hensch, "Critical Periods in Speech Perception: New Directions," Annu. Rev. Psych., vol. 66, pp. 173–196, 2015.
- P. Kandhadai, D.K. Danielson and J.F. Werker, "Culture as a binder for bilingual acquisition," Trends Neurosci. Educ., vol. 3, pp. 24–7, 2014.
- W.M. Weikum et al., "Prenatal exposure to antidepressants and depressed maternal mood alter trajectory of infant speech perception," PNAS, vol. 109, no. 2, pp. 17221–7, 2013.
