= List of members of the National Academy of Sciences (psychological and cognitive sciences) =

This list is a subsection of the List of members of the National Academy of Sciences, which includes more than 7,000 members and international members of the United States National Academy of Sciences, both living and deceased, each affiliated with one of 31 disciplinary sections. Members are listed under their primary section, and each person's name, primary institution, and election year are given. For deceased members, the year of death is noted.

== Psychological and cognitive sciences ==
Name	Institution	Year
Edward Adelson	Massachusetts Institute of Technology	2006
Mathew Alpern (died 1996)	University of Michigan	1991
Abram Amsel (died 2006)	University of Texas at Austin	1992
John R. Anderson	Carnegie Mellon University	1999
Richard N. Aslin	Yale School of Medicine	2013
Richard C. Atkinson	University of California, San Diego	1974
Renee Baillargeon	University of Illinois Urbana-Champaign	2015
Mahzarin Banaji	Harvard University	2018
Martin S. Banks	University of California, Berkeley	2019
Linda Bartoshuk	The George Washington University	2003
Frank A. Beach (died 1988)	University of California, Berkeley	1949
Marlene Behrmann	University of Pittsburgh School of Medicine	2015
Kent C. Berridge	University of Michigan	2024
Robert A. Bjork	University of California, Los Angeles	2022
Randolph Blake	Vanderbilt University	2012
Gordon Bower (died 2020)	Stanford University	1973
Robert Boynton (died 2006)	University of California, San Diego	1981
David H. Brainard	University of Pennsylvania	2023
Joan Bresnan	Stanford University	2023
Donald E. Broadbent (died 1993)	University of Oxford	1971
Roger Brown (died 1997)	Harvard University	1972
Susan Carey	Harvard University	2002
Marisa Carrasco	New York University	2021
BJ Casey	Barnard College	2025
Noam Chomsky	University of Arizona	1972
Robert Cialdini	Arizona State University	2019
Clyde Coombs (died 1988)	University of Michigan	1982
Lee J. Cronbach (died 2001)	Stanford University	1974
Eveline Crone	Erasmus University Rotterdam	2024
Anne Cutler (died 2022)	University of Western Sydney	2008
Russell L. De Valois (died 2003)	University of California, Berkeley	1976
Stanislas Dehaene	INSERM	2010
Ghislaine Dehaene-Lambertz	Centre National de la Recherche Scientifique	2022
Gary Dell	University of Illinois Urbana-Champaign	2015
Irving T. Diamond (died 2004)	Duke University Medical Center	1982
Barbara Dosher	University of California, Irvine	2011
Carol Dweck	Stanford University	2012
Alice Eagly	Northwestern University	2022
Jennifer Eberhardt	Stanford University	2016
Phoebe C. Ellsworth	University of Michigan	2025
Randall Engle	Georgia Institute of Technology	2020
William Estes (died 2011)	Indiana University	1963
Leon Festinger (died 1989)	The New School for Social Research	1972
Susan Fiske	Princeton University	2013
John Flavell (died 2025)	Stanford University	1994
Paul Fraisse (died 1996)	Université de Paris	1982
Marianne Frankenhaeuser (died 2005)	Stockholm University	1989
Uta Frith	University College London	2012
Robert Galambos (died 2010)	University of California, San Diego	1960
C. Randy Gallistel	Rutgers, The State University of New Jersey, New Brunswick	2002
John Garcia (died 2012)	University of California, Los Angeles	1983
Wendell R. Garner (died 2008)	Yale University	1965
Michael Gazzaniga	University of California, Santa Barbara	2011
Wilson S. Geisler	The University of Texas at Austin	2008
Michele J. Gelfand	Stanford University	2021
Rochel Gelman	Rutgers, The State University of New Jersey, New Brunswick	2006
Susan Gelman	University of Michigan	2012
Dedre Gentner	Northwestern University	2021
Eleanor J. Gibson (died 2002)	Cornell University	1971
Lila Gleitman (died 2021)	University of Pennsylvania	2000
Susan Goldin-Meadow	The University of Chicago	2020
Alison Gopnik	University of California, Berkeley	2025
Frances K. Graham (died 2013)	University of Delaware	1988
Norma Graham	Columbia University	1998
David M. Green (died 2022)	University of Florida	1978
Joy Paul Guilford (died 1987)	University of California, Berkeley	1954
Megan Gunnar	University of Minnesota	2022
Peter Hagoort	Max Planck Institute for Psycholinguistics	2018
Morris Halle (died 2018)	Massachusetts Institute of Technology	1988
Donald O. Hebb (died 1985)	Dalhousie University	1979
David Heeger	New York University	2013
Richard Held (died 2016)	Massachusetts Institute of Technology	1973
Ernest Hilgard (died 2001)	Stanford University	1948
Robert Hinde (died 2016)	University of Cambridge	1978
Geoffrey E. Hinton	University of Toronto	2023
Ira Hirsh (died 2010)	Washington University in St. Louis	1979
Julian Hochberg (died 2022)	Columbia University	1980
Carl Hovland (died 1961)	Yale University	1960
Leo Hurvich (died 2009)	University of Pennsylvania	1975
Dorothea Jameson (died 1998)	University of Pennsylvania	1975
Marcia Johnson	Yale University	2014
Philip Johnson-Laird	Princeton University	2007
James M. Jones	University of Delaware	2023
Béla Julesz (died 2003)	Rutgers University	1987
Daniel Kahneman (died 2024)	Princeton University	2001
Nancy Kanwisher	Massachusetts Institute of Technology	2005
Harold Kelley (died 2003)	University of California, Los Angeles	1978
Roberta Klatzky	Carnegie Mellon University	2022
Heinrich Klüver (died 1979)	University of Chicago	1957
Wolfgang Köhler (died 1967)	Swarthmore College	1947
Patricia Kuhl	University of Washington	2010
William Labov (died 2024)	University of Pennsylvania	1993
Barbara Landau	Johns Hopkins University	2018
Daniel S. Lehrman (died 1972)	Rutgers University	1970
Willem Levelt	Max Planck Institute for Psycholinguistics	2000
Alvin Liberman (died 2000)	Haskins Laboratories	1976
John C. Liebeskind (died 1997)	University of California, Los Angeles	1995
Donald B. Lindsley (died 2003)	University of California, Los Angeles	1952
Gardner Lindzey (died 2008)	Center for Advanced Study in the Behavioral Sciences	1989
Elizabeth Loftus	University of California, Irvine	2004
Gordon Logan	Vanderbilt University	2019
R. Duncan Luce (died 2012)	University of California, Irvine	1972
Eleanor Maccoby (died 2018)	Stanford University	1993
Brenda Major	University of California, Santa Barbara	2024
Ellen Markman	Stanford University	2011
Hazel Markus	Stanford University	2016
Peter Marler (died 2014)	University of California, Davis	1971
James McClelland	Stanford University	2001
Vonnie McLoyd	University of Michigan	2024
Douglas Medin	Northwestern University	2005
Paul E. Meehl (died 2003)	University of Minnesota	1987
David E. Meyer	University of Michigan	2009
George A. Miller (died 2012)	Princeton University	1962
Neal E. Miller (died 2002)	Yale University	1958
Walter Mischel (died 2018)	Columbia University	2004
Morris Moscovitch	University of Toronto	2025
Jacob Nachmias (died 2019)	University of Pennsylvania	1984
Lynn Nadel	University of Arizona	2021
Ulric Neisser (died 2012)	Cornell University	1989
Helen Neville (died 2018)	University of Oregon	2014
Nora Newcombe	Temple University	2024
Allen Newell (died 1992)	Carnegie Mellon University	1972
Elissa Newport	Georgetown University	2004
Richard Nisbett	University of Michigan	2002
Anna Christina Nobre	Yale University	2020
James Olds (died 1976)	California Institute of Technology	1967
Charles E. Osgood (died 1991)	University of Illinois Urbana-Champaign	1972
Barbara Partee	University of Massachusetts at Amherst	1989
James W. Pennebaker	The University of Texas at Austin	2025
Isabelle Peretz	University of Montreal	2022
Richard E. Petty	The Ohio State University	2025
Carl Pfaffmann (died 1994)	Rockefeller University	1959
Janet Pierrehumbert	University of Oxford	2019
Steven Pinker	Harvard University	2016
Michael Posner	University of Oregon	1981
Leo Postman (died 2004)	University of California, Berkeley	1974
Dale Purves	Duke-NUS Graduate Medical School	1989
Floyd Ratliff (died 1999)	The Rockefeller University	1966
Robert Rescorla (died 2020)	University of Pennsylvania	1985
Jennifer Richeson	Yale University	2015
Curt Richter (died 1988)	Johns Hopkins School of Medicine	1948
Austin H. Riesen (died 1996)	University of California, Riverside	1995
John R. Rickford	Stanford University	2021
Luigi Rizzi	Collège de France	2021
Henry Roediger	Washington University in St. Louis	2017
Mark Rosenzweig (died 2009)	University of California, Berkeley	1979
Lee Ross (died 2021)	Stanford University	2010
David Rumelhart (died 2011)	Stanford University	1991
Stanley Schachter (died 1997)	Columbia University	1983
Daniel Schacter	Harvard University	2013
Robert Sellers	University of Michigan	2023
Roger Shepard (died 2022)	Stanford University	1977
Richard Shiffrin	Indiana University at Bloomington	1995
Herbert A. Simon (died 2001)	Carnegie Mellon University	1967
B. F. Skinner (died 1990)	Harvard University	1950
Paul Slovic	Oregon Research Institute	2016
Edward E. Smith (died 2012)	Columbia University	1996
Linda B. Smith	Indiana University at Bloomington	2019
Eugene N. Sokolov (died 2008)	Moscow State University	1965
Richard Solomon (died 1995)	Harvard University	1968
Elizabeth Spelke	Harvard University	1999
George Sperling	University of California, Irvine	1985
Roger Wolcott Sperry (died 1994)	California Institute of Technology	1960
Claude Steele	Stanford University	2003
Eliot Stellar (died 1993)	University of Pennsylvania	1968
Saul Sternberg	University of Pennsylvania	1982
Patrick Suppes (died 2014)	Stanford University	1978
John Swets (died 2016)	BBN Technologies	1990
Shelley Taylor	University of California, Los Angeles	2009
Philip Teitelbaum	University of Florida	1974
Michael Tomasello	Duke University	2017
Anne Treisman (died 2018)	Princeton University	1994
Endel Tulving (died 2023)	University of Toronto	1988
Amos Tversky (died 1996)	Stanford University	1985
Benton J. Underwood (died 1994)	Northwestern University	1970
Allan R. Wagner (died 2018)	Yale University	1992
Hans Wallach (died 1998)	Swarthmore College	1986
Brian Wandell	Stanford University	2003
Elke Weber	Princeton University	2020
Henry Wellman	University of Michigan	2024
Janet Werker	University of British Columbia	2020
E. Glen Wever (died 1991)	Princeton University	1940
David R. Williams	University of Rochester	2014
Timothy Wilson	University of Virginia	2020
Jozef Zwislocki (died 2018)	Syracuse University	1990
