= Donders =

Donders is a Dutch surname meaning "thunder's", perhaps originally referring to a person's temper or voice, or to an artillery man. Donders may refer to:

- Peter Donders (1807–1887), Dutch beatified Roman Catholic Missionary
- Franciscus Donders (1818–1889), Dutch ophthalmologist
  - Donders' law, describing the three-dimensional orientation of the eye and its axes of rotation
  - Donders Centre for Cognition and F.C. Donders Centre for Cognitive Neuroimaging, research institutes
- Rianne Donders-de Leest (born 1960), Dutch CDA politician
- Mireille Donders (born 1974), Swiss sprinter

== See also ==
- Donner, German surname with the same meaning
