= Jan-Benedict Steenkamp =

American economist

- Born: Joannes Evangelista Benedictus Maria Steenkamp; June 12, 1959 (age 67); Amsterdam
- Occupations: professor Author; Consultant
- Title: Knox Massey Distinguished Professor of Marketing
- Awards: Elsevier Science-SMA Distinguished Marketing Scholar Award (2004); Dr Hendrik Muller Prize (2005); EMAC Distinguished Marketing Scholar Award (2013); Gilbert A. Churchill Award (2015); AMA Global Marketing Lifetime Award (2018)

Academic background
- Education: Wageningen University
- Thesis: 'Product Quality' (1989)
- Doctoral advisor: Thieu Meulenberg

Academic work
- Discipline: Marketing
- Institutions: University of North Carolina at Chapel Hill; Tilburg University; Catholic University of Leuven; Wageningen University
- Doctoral students: Michel Wedel
- Website: http://www.brandbreakout.com/

Joannes Evangelista Benedictus Maria "Jan-Benedict" Steenkamp (born June 12, 1959) is a Dutch-American marketing professor and author. He is the Knox Massey Distinguished Professor of Marketing at Kenan-Flagler Business School, University of North Carolina at Chapel Hill. He is also the co-founder and executive director of AiMark, a global center studying key marketing strategy issues. Steenkamp is the author of Time to Lead, Retail Disruptors, Global Brand Strategy, Brand Breakout and Private Label Strategy. He is one of the most cited scholars in business and marketing.

== Early life ==
Steenkamp was born in Amsterdam, as the third child of Constance Marie Therèse (née Nolet), and Petrus Antonius Josephus Maria (Piet) Steenkamp (March 8, 1925 – January 8, 2016). In 1966, the family moved to Eindhoven where his father became full professor and dean at the Eindhoven University of Technology. His father founded the Christian Democratic Appeal (CDA) which was the senior party in the Dutch government for most of the period 1977–2010 and was the president of the Dutch Senate from 1983 to 1991.

== Education and career ==
Steenkamp received his PhD (marketing), Master of Science (business administration) and Bachelor of Science (economics) degrees (all summa cum laude) from Wageningen University in the Netherlands. In 2010, he was awarded a Doctor Honoris Causa by Aarhus University for his contributions to marketing science.

From 1966 to 1977, Steenkamp attended elementary and secondary school in Eindhoven. From 1977 to 1983, he studied economics (Bachelor's) and business administration (Master's) at Wageningen University, the Netherlands. He wrote two master theses, one on the political risks multinational corporations face when investing in foreign countries, and a second one on the construction of orthogonal designs for conjoint measurement experiments. In 1983, he was appointed lecturer of marketing at Wageningen University, and in 1985, assistant professor. He obtained his PhD degree in 1989. In the 1980s, Dutch universities did not have a formal dissertation trajectory – one was expected to do it on the job, after obtaining a master's degree. His dissertation, Product Quality, was commercially published by Van Gorcum. His dissertation research drew international attention, especially the finding of an almost negligible correlation between a product's price and its real quality.

He worked at Wageningen University from 1989 to 1992. Between 1992 and 2000, he was associate professor and from 1996 onwards full professor at the Catholic University of Leuven, Belgium. At the same time, he was GfK Professor of International Marketing Research at Wageningen University. Between 2000 and 2006, he was CentER Research Professor of Marketing and GfK Professor of International Marketing Research, Tilburg University, Netherlands. In 2006, he joined UNC Kenan-Flagler Business School as C. Knox Massey Distinguished Professor of Marketing and chairman of the Marketing Area.

Steenkamp is the co-founder and executive director of AiMark, a global center studying key marketing strategy issues, which works closely with two of the world's largest market research agencies, Kantar and GfK. He is a Fellow at the Institute for Sustainable Innovation and Growth (iSIG), Fudan University, Shanghai.

He has consulted with organisations such as Procter & Gamble, Kraft, General Mills, Zurich Insurance Group, KPMG, Unilever, Johnson & Johnson, Sara Lee, Reckitt Benckiser, Bristol-Myers Squibb, Bunge Limited, The Brattle Group, GfK, TNS, IRI, Nutreco, Netherlands Department of Agriculture, King & Spalding, Shook, Hardy & Bacon and Sidley Austin.

Steenkamp's work has been featured in The Wall Street Journal, Financial Times, The Economist, The New York Times, Los Angeles Times, The Times of India, Hindustan Times, China Daily, Ad Age, Business Today and Bloomberg Businessweek.

== Research and publications ==
Steenkamp is a leading scholar and widely cited expert on Global Marketing, Branding, Marketing Strategy and Emerging Markets.

He has published his research in the Journal of Marketing, Journal of Marketing Research, Marketing Science, Journal of Consumer Research, Psychometrika, Management Science, Academy of Management Journal, Strategic Management Journal and Harvard Business Review.

Steenkamp's research deals with the various elements of marketing strategy (product, price, promotion, advertising, distribution, segmentation) and marketing research methodology. Collectively, his body of research involves integrating theory drawn from marketing and other social science domains (management, economics, psychology, political science) with cutting edge, rigorous methodology, using large empirical data sets, to address managerially relevant research issues.

== Awards and honors ==
In 2005, Steenkamp was awarded the Dr Hendrik Muller Prize for "exceptional achievements in the area of the behavioral and social sciences" by the Royal Netherlands Academy of Arts and Sciences. This was the first time the prize awarded to a researcher in any area of business administration. He also served on the 2018 Spinoza Prize Committee.

The IJRM-EMAC Steenkamp Award given annually to research papers published in International Journal of Research in Marketing that have made a long-term impact on the field of marketing is named in his honor. In 2018, he was awarded the AMA Global Marketing Lifetime award for significant contributions to Global Marketing.

In 2008, Steenkamp was ranked the most influential scholar in marketing in the period 1997–2006.

The Elsevier Society for Marketing Advances named him the 2004 Elsevier Distinguished Marketing Scholar. In 2013 he was given the EMAC Distinguished Marketing Scholar Award in recognition of his impactful research contributions and outstanding contributions to the European Marketing Academy.

In 2015, the American Marketing Association awarded him the Gilbert A. Churchill Award for Lifetime Contributions to Marketing Research. This award recognized Steenkamp as a leading expert on structural equation modeling and cited his contributions on measurement invariance for setting new standards for international marketing research.

Steenkamp has won several awards for his research publications. He won the 2002 John D.C. Little award and the 2003 Frank Bass award from INFORMS for his research work. He was given the Willim F. O'Dell Award for the 1999 article in the Journal of Marketing Research that has made the "most significant long-term contribution to marketing theory, methodology, and/or practice" for the paper International Market Segmentation Based on Consumer-Product Relations.

== Books ==
- Jan-Benedict Steenkamp (2020). Time to Lead. Fast Company Press. ISBN 978-1-7343248-2-2.
- Jan-Benedict Steenkamp; Laurens Sloot (2018). Retail Disruptors: The Spectacular Rise and Impact of the Hard Discounters. Kogan Page. ISBN 978-0-7494-8347-0.
- Jan-Benedict Steenkamp (2017). Global Brand Strategy: World-wise Marketing in the Age of Branding. Palgrave Macmillan. ISBN 978-1-349-94994-6.
- Nirmalya Kumar; Jan-Benedict Steenkamp (2013). Brand Breakout: How Emerging Market Brands Will Go Global. Palgrave Macmillan. ISBN 978-1-137-46759-1.
- Nirmalya Kumar; Jan-Benedict Steenkamp (2007). Private Label Strategy: How to Meet the Store Brand Challenge. Harvard Business School Press. ISBN 978-1-4221-0167-4.
- Berend Wierenga; Aad van Tilburg; Klaus Grunert; Jan-Benedict E.M. Steenkamp; Michel Wedel, eds. (1997). Agricultural Marketing and Consumer Behaviour in a Changing World. Kluwer Academic Publishers. p. 315. ISBN 978-1-4615-6273-3.
- Jan-Benedict Steenkamp (1989). Product Quality: An Investigation Into the Concept and how it is Perceived by Consumers. Van Gorcum. p. 273. ISBN 978-90-232-2415-0.

== Selected publications ==
- Angela Xia Liu; Jan-Benedict E.M. Steenkamp; Jurui Zhang (2018). "Agglomeration as Driver of the Volume of Electronic Word of Mouth in Restaurant Industry". Journal of Marketing Research. 55 (4): 507–523. doi:10.1509/jmr.16.0182. S2CID 169805618.
- Jan-Benedict E.M. Steenkamp (2018). "The Future of the Marketing Department at Business Schools". Journal of the Academy of Marketing Science. 46 (2): 169–172. doi:10.1007/s11747-017-0562-5.
- Jan-Benedict E.M. Steenkamp; Alberto Maydeu-Olivares (2015). "Stability and Change in Consumer Traits: Evidence from a 12-Year Longitudinal Study, 2002-2013". Journal of Marketing Research. 52 (3): 287–308. doi:10.1509/jmr.13.0592. JSTOR 1251945. S2CID 143896742.
- Jan-Benedict E.M. Steenkamp; Inge Geyskens (2014). "Manufacturer and retailer strategies to impact store brand share: Global integration, local adaptation, and worldwide learning". Marketing Science. 33 (1): 6–26. doi:10.1287/mksc.2013.0801.
- Harald van Heerde; Maarten Gijsenberg; Marnik G. Dekimpe; Jan-Benedict E.M. Steenkamp (2013). "Price and Advertising Effectiveness over the Business Cycle" (PDF). Journal of Marketing Research. 50 (2): 177–193. doi:10.1509/jmr.10.0414. hdl:11370/7ab91945-ca76-447a-aa5c-b582dd0407da. S2CID 154198524.
- Lien Lamey; Barbara Deleersnyder; Jan-Benedict E.M. Steenkamp; Marnik G. Dekimpe (2012). "The Effect of Business Cycle Fluctuations on Private-Label Share: What Has Marketing Conduct Got to Do with It?". Journal of Marketing. 76 (1): 1–19. doi:10.1509/jm.09.0320. S2CID 68653352.
- Jan-Benedict E.M. Steenkamp; Eric Fang (2011). "The Impact of Economic Contractions on the Effectiveness of R&D and Advertising: Evidence from U.S. Companies Spanning Three Decades". Marketing Science. 30 (4): 628–645. doi:10.1287/mksc.1110.0641.
- Jan-Benedict E.M. Steenkamp; Harald van Heerde; Inge Geyskens (2010). "What Makes Consumers Willing to Pay a Price Premium for National Brands over Private Labels?". Journal of Marketing Research. 47 (6): 1011–1024. doi:10.1509/jmkr.47.6.1011. S2CID 166356503.
- Jan-Benedict E.M. Steenkamp; Martijn G. de Jong (2010). "A Global Investigation into the Constellation of Consumer Attitudes Toward Global and Local Products". Journal of Marketing. 74 (6): 18–40. doi:10.1509/jmkg.74.6.18. S2CID 167882216.
- Martijn G. de Jong; Jan-Benedict E. M. Steenkamp; Bernard P. Veldkamp (2009). "A Model for the Construction of Country-Specific Yet Internationally Comparable Short-Form Marketing Scales" (PDF). Marketing Science. 28 (4): 674–689. doi:10.1287/mksc.1080.0439. Archived from the original (PDF) on March 16, 2024.
- Kusum L. Ailawadi; Koen Pauwels; Jan-Benedict E.M. Steenkamp (2008). "Private-Label Use and Store Loyalty". Journal of Marketing. 72 (6): 19–30. doi:10.1509/jmkg.72.6.19. hdl:10679/57.
- Katrijn Gielens; Linda Van de Gucht; Jan-Benedict E.M. Steenkamp; Marnik Dekimpe (2008). "Dancing with the Giant: The Effect of Wal-Mart's Entry in the U.K. on the Performance of European Retailers". Journal of Marketing Research. 45 (5): 519–534. doi:10.1509/jmkr.45.5.519. JSTOR 20618840. S2CID 131949521.
- Inge Geyskens; Jan-Benedict E. M. Steenkamp; Nirmalya Kumar (2006). "Make, Buy, or Ally: A Transaction Cost Theory Meta-analysis". Academy of Management Journal. 49 (3): 519–543. doi:10.5465/AMJ.2006.21794670. JSTOR 1251945. S2CID 166806134.
- Jan-Benedict E. M. Steenkamp; Vincent R. Nijs; Dominique M. Hanssens; Marnik G. Dekimpe (2005). "Competitive Reactions to Advertising and Promotion Attacks". Marketing Science. 24 (1): 35–54. doi:10.1287/mksc.1040.0069.
- Hans Baumgartner; Jan-Benedict E.M. Steenkamp (2001). "Response Styles in Marketing Research: A Cross-National Investigation". Journal of Marketing Research. 38 (2): 143–156. doi:10.1509/jmkr.38.2.143.18840. JSTOR 1558620. S2CID 11304067.
- Jan-Benedict E. M. Steenkamp; Frenkel ter Hofstede; Michel Wedel (1999). "A Cross-National Investigation into the Individual and National Cultural Antecedents of Consumer Innovativeness". Journal of Marketing. 63 (2): 55–69. doi:10.2307/1251945. JSTOR 1251945.
- Jan-Benedict E.M. Steenkamp; Hans Baumgartner (1998). "Assessing Measurement Invariance in Cross-national Consumer Research". Journal of Consumer Research. 25 (1): 78–107. doi:10.1086/209528. JSTOR 10.1086/209528.

== See also ==
- Global Marketing
- Marketing Strategy
- Marketing Mix
- Consumer Innovativeness
- Private Label
- Diaspora Marketing
- Measurement invariance
- Common-method variance
