= India's Global Powerhouses =

Book on Indian economic giants

India's Global Powerhouses - How They Are Taking on the World
- Author: Nirmalya Kumar
- Language: English
- Subject: economics
- Publisher: Harvard Business Press
- Publication date: 2009
- ISBN: 978-1-4221-4762-7

India's Global Powerhouses - How They Are Taking on the World is a 2009 book by Nirmalya Kumar. The book discusses the success of some of the largest commercial companies in India.

== Content ==
India's Global Powerhouses informs readers about the 2009 contemporary phenomenon of Indian private firms becoming multinational and discusses common attributes of smaller multinational India-based companies.

== Companies profiled ==
The book profiles some Indian companies, including the following:

- ArcelorMittal
- Infosys
- Bharat Forge
- Essel Propack
- Hindalco
- Mahindra & Mahindra
- Hidesign
- Marico
- Godrej
- VIP Industries
- United Breweries Group
- Suzlon
- Tata Group
