= Harold Snieder =

Dutch genetic epidemiologist

- Born: May 30, 1965 (age 61)
- Education: Vrije Universiteit Amsterdam
- Awards: (with Edwin van den Oord) David Fulker Award for the best publication in Behavior Genetics (2002)
- Scientific career
- Fields: Genetic epidemiology
- Workplaces: University Medical Center Groningen
- Thesis: Genetic epidemiology of risk factors of cardiovascular disease. A study of middle-aged twins (1996)
- Doctoral advisors: Lorenz van Doornen; Dorret Boomsma
- Other academic advisors: Tim Spector

Harold Snieder (born May 30, 1965) is a Dutch genetic epidemiologist and professor in the Department of Epidemiology of University Medical Center Groningen, where he also leads the Unit of Genetic Epidemiology and Bioinformatics.
