= Frühling Rijsdijk =

Dutch behavior geneticist

- Born: Frühling Vesta Rijsdijk
- Other name: F.V. Rijsdijk
- Education: Vrije Universiteit Amsterdam
- Known for: Structural equation modeling
- Scientific career
- Fields: Behavior genetics; Statistical genetics
- Workplaces: Institute of Psychiatry, Psychology and Neuroscience
- Thesis: The genetics of neural speed, a genetic study on nerve conduction velocity, reaction times and psychometric abilities (1997)
- Doctoral advisors: Jacob Orlebeke; Dorret Boomsma

Frühling Vesta Rijsdijk is a Dutch behavior geneticist who is a professor in Statistical and Behavioral Genetics at the Anton de Kom University in Paramaribo, Suriname. She focuses on many aspects of genetics and behaviors of twins.

== Education ==
She started working on her degree in 1985, studying behavior genetics from the Vrije Universiteit Amsterdam. Finishing her education in 1997, when she got her PhD. She received an HEA Senior Fellowship from King's in January 2019.

=== Career ===
After getting her PhD, she took a job as a Post-Doc in the Department of Psychiatry of the Universiteit Groningen, in the Netherlands from 1997 to 1999. During that time she developed structural equation modeling for use in behavioral genetic studies of twins. From 1999 to 2023 she worked as a Lecturer and Professor at the Institute of Psychiatry, Psychology and Neuroscience, a school of King's College London. As she was there, in 2021, she took another job but still maintained her occupation as a professor at the Anton de Kom University up until the present.

=== Publications ===
She has published and contributed over 200 articles. Her more recent studies focus on genetic and environmental influences on twins. In the past 5 years she’s published around 33 separate articles.
