= Wolfgang Klein (linguist) =

German linguist (born 1946)

Wolfgang Klein (born February 3, 1946) is a German linguist and a founding director of the Max Planck Institute for Psycholinguistics. He's known for his contributions in language acquisition, text analysis and studies on the semantics of time and space.

== Education and career ==
Klein was born in Spiesen of Saarland. He attended elementary school there from 1952 to 1956 and the secondary school in Sulzbach from 1956 to 1965. Klein then studied German, Romance languages and philosophy at the Saarland University, where he received his doctorate in 1970. He then continued research at the Saarland University before moving to Heidelberg. After his habilitation in 1972 at the University of Heidelberg, he became an academic advisor and then a full professor at the same place from 1972 to 1976. From 1976 to 1980, Klein was a professor at the University of Frankfurt am Main. During this time, Klein also worked with Willem Levelt starting from 1977. In 1980, Willem Levelt and Klein co-founded the Max Planck Institute for Psycholinguistics in Nijmegen and Klein became the director of the language acquisition department. He retired from the institute in 2015.

Klein also headed the Language Archive, which was established in 2010 at the Max Planck Institute for Psycholinguistics and documents endangered languages with funding from the Volkswagen Foundation. Klein writes regularly in the Zeitschrift für Literaturwissenschaft und Linguistik (Journal for Literary Studies and Linguistics), which he co-founded in 1970.

== Honors and awards ==
In 1994, Klein became a member of the Berlin-Brandenburg Academy of Sciences and Humanities, where he heads the Digital Dictionary of the German Language. In 1996, Klein received the Gottfried Wilhelm Leibniz Prize from the German Research Foundation. In 2009, he became a member of the German Academy for Language and Poetry, where he was Vice President from 2014 till 2020. In 2018, Klein was awarded the Wilhelm von Humboldt prize for linguistics.

== Bibliography ==
- Klein, Wolfgang; Zimmermann, Harald, eds. (1971-12-31). Index zu Georg Trakl: Dichtungen. DE GRUYTER. doi:10.1515/9783110930382. ISBN 978-3-484-38007-3.
- Klein, Wolfgang (1973). Functional generative grammar in Prague. Kronberg/Taunus: Scriptor-Verlag. ISBN 9783589000869.
- Klein, Wolfgang (1974). Variation in der Sprache: ein Verfahren zu ihrer Beschreibung. Skripten Linguistik und Kommunikationswissenschaft. Kronberg (Ts.): Scriptor-Verlag. ISBN 978-3-589-00093-7.
- Klein, Wolfgang; Dittmar, Norbert (1979). Developing Grammars: The acquisition of German syntax by foreign workers. Springer Berlin Heidelberg. doi:10.1007/978-3-642-67385-6. ISBN 978-3-642-67387-0.
- Klein, Wolfgang; Levelt, Willem, eds. (1981). Crossing the Boundaries in Linguistics. Springer Netherlands. doi:10.1007/978-94-009-8453-0. ISBN 978-94-009-8455-4.
- Weissenborn, Jürgen; Klein, Wolfgang, eds. (1 January 1982). Here and There: Cross-linguistic Studies on Deixis and Demonstration. Pragmatics & Beyond. John Benjamins Publishing Company. doi:10.1075/pb.iii.2-3. ISBN 978-90-272-2519-1.
- Klein, Wolfgang (23 January 1986). Second Language Acquisition (1 ed.). Cambridge University Press. doi:10.1017/CBO9780511815058. ISBN 978-0-521-26879-0.
- Klein, Wolfgang (1992). Zweitspracherwerb: eine Einführung (3. Aufl., unveränd. Nachdr. der 2. Aufl ed.). Frankfurt am Main: Hain. ISBN 9783445030580.
- Klein, Wolfgang; Perdue, Clive (13 August 1992). Utterance Structure: Developing grammars again. John Benjamins Publishing Company. doi:10.1075/sibil.5. ISBN 978-90-272-4106-1.
- Dietrich, Rainer; Klein, Wolfgang; Noyau, Colette (24 August 1995). The Acquisition of Temporality in a Second Language. John Benjamins Publishing Company. doi:10.1075/sibil.7. ISBN 978-90-272-4109-2.
- Becker, Angelika; Klein, Wolfgang; Parádi, Zsuzsa; Witzmann, Franziska (2008). Recht verstehen: wie Laien, Juristen und Versicherungsagenten die "Riester-Rente" interpretieren. Interdisziplinäre Arbeitsgruppen Forschungsberichte. Berlin: Akad.-Verl. ISBN 978-3-05-004484-2.
- Klein, Wolfgang; Li, Ping (2009). The expression of time. Berlin: M. de Gruyter. ISBN 9783110195828.
- Klein, Wolfgang (13 September 2013). Time in Language (1 ed.). Routledge. doi:10.4324/9781315003801. ISBN 978-1-315-00380-1.
- Klein, Wolfgang (2015). Von den Werken der Sprache (in German). J.B. Metzler. doi:10.1007/978-3-476-05420-3. ISBN 978-3-476-02603-3.
- Klein, Wolfgang (19 March 2018). Looking at Language. De Gruyter. doi:10.1515/9783110549119. ISBN 978-3-11-054911-9.
