= Caroline F. Rowland =

Psychologist

- Education: University of Nottingham (UK)
- Scientific career
- Fields: Psychologist
- Workplaces: Max Planck Institute for Psycholinguistics; Radboud University
- Thesis: The acquisition of wh-questions in early English multi-word speech (2000)
- Doctoral advisor: Julian Pine

Caroline F. Rowland (born 1971) is a British psychologist and linguist known for her work on child first language development, grammar acquisition, and the role of environment in child's language growth. Since 2016, she has been the Director of the Language Development Department at the Max Planck Institute for Psycholinguistics in Nijmegen. She holds the position of Professor of First Language Acquisition by Special Appointment at Donders Centre for Cognition at Radboud University Nijmegen. She has also been an Honorary Research Associate in Psychological Sciences at University of Liverpool since 2018.

== Biography ==
Rowland received her B.A. degree in Psychology from the University of Manchester (UK) in 1993, under the supervision of Elena Lieven. She obtained her Ph.D. in Psychology at the University of Nottingham (UK) in 2000. Her dissertation, The acquisition of wh-questions in early English multi-word speech, was supervised by Julian Pine. This study analyzed the data from twelve 2 to 3 years old children collected over a year and provided detailed evidence for children's early wh-question development from a constructivist perspective.

Prior to joining the Language Development Department at Max Planck Institute for Psycholinguistics, Rowland held a position as a professor of developmental psychology in the Department of Psychological Sciences at University of Liverpool from 2001 to 2016. From 2014 to 2019, she was a co-director of the International Center for Language and Communicative Development (LuCid), which is a research collaboration established jointly by University of Manchester, University of Liverpool, and University of Lancaster and funded by the Economic and Social Research Council (ESRC). Since 2019, Rowland has been an international co-investigator for a number of LuCiD projects.

Rowland is also a series editor of the Trends in Language Acquisition (TiLAR) book series and an associate editor of the Journal of Child Language.

In 2026 Rowland was elected member of the Academia Europaea.

== Research ==
Rowland's research focuses on children's vocabulary and grammar acquisition, how the development of brain supports language learning, and how different environments and cultures affect language development. She takes a multi-method approach, including experimental studies, naturalistic data analysis and computer modeling to assess how different models of the child's learning mechanism predict language acquisition.

Rowland and her colleagues have explored numerous factors associated with child's language growth, including caregiver speech, eye gaze, input diversity, and frequency. In her co-authored article, Diversity not quantity in caregiver speech: Using computational modeling to isolate the effects of the quantity and the diversity of the input on vocabulary growth, Rowland and her colleague used a computational model to control the quantity and quality of the linguistic input and found that while the input quantity may be important early in learning, lexical diversity is ultimately more crucial thereafter.

From 2014 to 2019, Rowland led the Language 0-5 project, which is the central component of the LuCid Phase 1 research that conducted a longitudinal study on language development in 80 English-speaking children from 6 months and 5 years in the UK. By analyzing the large-scaled data, Rowland and her colleagues proposed that there are a number of factors that predict the speed of children's lexicon learning, including gender, statistical learning ability, speed of language processing, verbal working memory, and executive function ability. Since 2019, Rowland has been working on the LuCid research projects: "Building individualised models of language development", and "Language 0-7: The transition to literacy". Built on data collected from the Language 0-5 project, these projects expand the research by following the 0-5 children during their transition from pre-school to the first year of formal schooling and examining how children's pre-school language environment and cognitive skills affect their literacy development

Rowland is the author of the textbook Understanding Child Language Acquisition, which is an introduction to the influential theories and studies conducted in the field of child language acquisition. She co-edited Current perspectives on child language acquisition: How children use their environment to learn (with Anna L. Theakston, Ben Ambridge, and Katherine E. Twomey).

== Books ==
- Rowland, C. (2013). Understanding child language acquisition. Routledge.
- Rowland, C. F., Theakston, A. L., Ambridge, B., & Twomey, K. E. (Eds.) (2020). Current perspectives on child language acquisition: How children use their environment to learn. John Benjamins Publishing Company.

== Representative articles ==
- Rowland, C. F. (2007). Explaining errors in children's questions. Cognition, 104(1), 106-134.
- Rowland, C. F., Chang, F., Ambridge, B., Pine, J. M., & Lieven, E. V. (2012). The development of abstract syntax: Evidence from structural priming and the lexical boost. Cognition, 125(1), 49-63.
- Rowland, C. F., & Pine, J. M. (2000). Subject–auxiliary inversion errors and wh-question acquisition:'What children do know?' Journal of Child Language, 27(1), 157-181.
- Rowland, C. F., Pine, J. M., Lieven, E. V., & Theakston, A. L. (2003). Determinants of acquisition order in wh-questions: Re-evaluating the role of caregiver speech. Journal of Child Language, 30(3), 609-635.
