= Visual marketing =

Visual marketing is the discipline of studying the relationship between an object, the context it is placed in and its relevant image. Representing a disciplinary link between economy, visual perception laws and cognitive psychology, the subject mainly applies to businesses such as fashion and design.

As a key component of modern marketing, visual marketing focuses on studying and analyzing how images can be used to make objects the center of visual communication. The intent is that the product and its visual communication therefore become strategically linked and inseparable and their fusion is what reaches out to people, engages them and defines their choices (a marketing mechanism known as persuasion). Not to be confused with visual merchandising, that is one of its facets and more about retail spaces; here, Marketing gets customers in the door. Once inside, merchandising takes over—affecting the placement of products, signage, display materials, ambiance and employee staffing.

Utilizing images and visuals makes a marketing plan better. Images make concepts and intangible ideas more concrete, influencing the perception of the audience. This helps the audience envision a brand and its message in their mind's eye and make it more memorable during the time of purchase.

Visual marketing can be a part of every aspect of the communication mix. Marketing influences consumers' buying behaviour and visual marketing enhances this through factors such as recall, memory, and identity.

Growing trends in the usage of picture based websites and social networking platforms like Pinterest, Instagram, Tumblr, and Timeline feature of Facebook justifies the fact that people want to believe what they see, and therefore, need for Visual Marketing.

Visual marketing includes all visual cues like logo, signage, sales tools, vehicles, packaging, labeling, uniforms, right to your Advertisements, Brochures, Informational DVDs, Websites, everything that meets the Public Eye and can create a direct visual reference for a brand, product or service.

== History ==
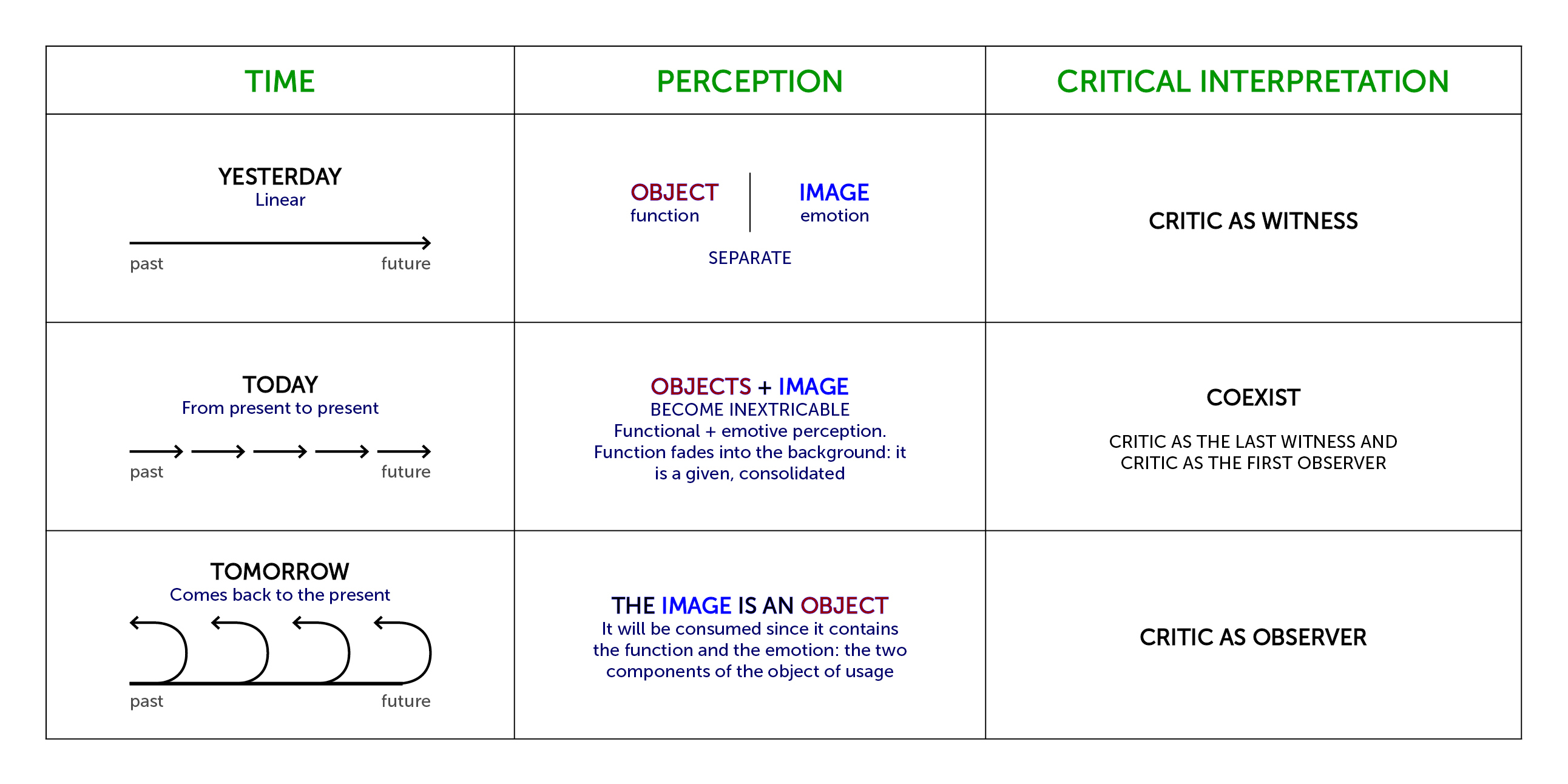
Table showing the evolution of Visual Marketing in terms of Time-Perception-Critical interpretation – Paolo Schianchi

The roots of this way of interpreting objects lie in Susan Sontag's essay Notes on "Camp", written back in the 1960s; the author points out that objects are not interesting in themselves but rather in the way they are represented, being the result of a series of considerations that touch upon the object's history, its symbolism, its manifestation and realization in the eyes of the beholder. As it developed, visual marketing highlighted the masking of an object, which instead of just being a product, turns into the star of its own 'production", so it changes from itself into something else, at the precise moment it enters the market. According to Paolo Schianchi, architect and designer, an Italian visual marketing academic:

“(...) Objects are: real, as what we see; visible - what they are made from; perfect - their classic identity; communication - their bond with taste; form and function - container and content; emotion - the story they can evoke; critical operation - the language that consecrates and exposes it; industrial operation - making them active and productive; image - the what and the how; anonymous - merely because it exits (...)“

All of these components – that belong to and define an objects from the viewpoint of the market and of the consumer – are the research and planning nuances that encompass the scope of visual marketing.

So, this branch "(...) acts on several levels of the design of an object: the idea (objects have to meet certain functions and be neutral, round, sharp-edged, eccentric shapes etc.); the communication (for a certain period in one geographic zone, then turned into a luxury item, at another time disguised as eco-friendly etc.) and in the end, the exhibition – in a trade fair, in a showroom and at other events (the object is approachable but its context drops it into atmospheres as an unusual industrial find, an emotional dispenser of functions, unapproachable art and design object, etc.). (...)".

In the words of Umberto Galimberti, Italian philosopher and psychoanalyst "(...) Even when there is no lack of money, the desire – now defined by fashion – does not refer so much to objects as to the myths surrounding them, and often the only thing being consumed is the myth itself…… (...)".

This concept is taken up again by Gillo Dorfles in his book "Il feticcio quotidiano" (The daily fetish): "(...) This is why I believe I can say that it is now possible to talk about a new ergonomic standard, not connected to the height of a desk or to the pneumatic quality of padding but to the creation of that “mythical image” that a design object must present if it is really right for the purpose it was designed for (...)"..

The mythology that covers objects to the point of becoming one with them, is decoded, in this branch through the study of various visual and verbal languages belonging to the groups of interest.

So visual marketing draws the attention away from traditional targets to focus on “...interest groups that are no longer broken down by age, gender, education or any other personal records and social contexts but by type of involvement, whether it be sports (golf or football fans), personal (wine connoisseurs or collectors), cultural (art and classical music lovers), etc. All these groups contain visual, verbal, sound, gesture, olfactory and formal codes that they refer to and use to communicate... ” So, the expressive group behaviours lie behind the new sub-alphabets whose decoding can be used to create direct marketing methods with the group itself.

One of the people inspiring this almost anthropological approach is Marc Augé, who in his book “Le temps en ruines” (Time in ruins) notes that: “the world where image is omnipresent requires the reality to be reflected in its image...”. Paolo Schianchi's research underscored how the act of putting together the image of the reality generated by each interest group is composed of language sets made of words, sounds, images, smells and shapes that give rise to various sub-alphabets when combined differently. If correctly decoded, these expressive elements become the means to get in touch with a group and direct a message inside it This aspect of visual marketing helps to create targeted marketing campaigns that go straight to the users’ emotions and representations of reality, using their own expressive language

The roots of this principle lie in Vilém Flusser's “Into the universe of technical images” (originally published as Ins Universum der technischen Bilder), where he claims: “ ... all ethics, all ontology, all epistemology will be excluded from the pictures, and it will become meaningless to ask whether something good or bad, real or artificial, true or false, or even what it means. The only remaining question is what I can experience...”. This is how the author introduced the concept of the expressive emotion at the origin of visual and verbal sub-alphabets, which belong to each individual at the moment they become part of an interest group. Visual marketing has taken these concepts onboard and to communicate a product to a group it decodes their emotional and individual languages, because we now know that everyone lives“... a double life, where each person is the representation of themselves, becoming inseparable from the physical person, as objects are from their image...”

Visual Marketing consultants plan around this, moving from the design of the object to its visual display, and in so doing creating the mythology around it. Theories on visual marketing have been developed by author and professor in Consumer Science, Michel Wedel.

=== Infographics ===
Infographics are one of the most popular visual content formats. Infographics are typically used communicate information in a visually appealing and easy-to-understand manner, and are one of the most shared pieces of visual content online.

=== Memes and Branded Quotes ===
Another common visual content type is the meme and/or branded quote. Currently this visual format is the most shareable content type over social media platforms.

=== Video ===
Videos are a popular visual marketing format on the web today. There are numerous types of videos used in visual marketing including: how-to videos, animated explainer videos, demonstrations or customer testimonials.

=== Images ===
Marketer Jeff Bullas cites that articles with images get 94% more views than those without. When you put some quality images within any content, people are more inclined to finish reading what you’ve written.

=== Presentations ===
Presentations can be used to organize visual media into one slideshow or discussion.

== Bibliography ==
- Susan Sontag, Notes on "Camp", Partisan Review 1964
- Michel Wedel-Rik Peters, Visual marketing, Psychology Press, September 2007 ISBN 978-0-8058-6292-8
- P. Schianchi, Verso il bagno Camp, Il Sole 24 Ore Business Media, 2008
- Umberto Galimberti, I miti del nostro tempo, Feltrinelli 2009
- Paolo Schianchi, Visual marketing. L'immagine fotografica, in CE International n. 226, Il Sole 24 Ore Business Media 2009
- R. Pieters, M. Wedel, Goal Control of Visual Attention to Advertising: The Yarbus Implication, in Journal of Consumer Research no. 34, August 2007, pages 224-233
- R. Van der Lans, R. Pieters, M. Wedel, Competitive Brand Salience, Marketing Science, 27(5), 2008
- M. Wedel R. Pieters, Eye Tracking for Visual Marketing, Now publishers Inc, 2008
- P. Schianchi, Nuvole di estetica e prodotto, ISRE Edizioni Salesiane, year XVII, no. 1, 2010
- P. Schianchi, Visual Marketing, in B & A No. 247, Il Sole 24 Ore, 2011
- D.Langton and A. Campbell, Visual Marketing. 99 proven ways for small business to market with images and design, WILEY * John Wiley & Sons inc., Hoboken, New Jersey, 2011
- P. Schianchi, L'immagine è un oggetto. Fondamenti di visual marketing con storytelling, libreriauniversitaria.it edizioni, Padova 2013. ISBN 978-88-6292-413-9
