= Dr Hendrik Muller Prize =

Dutch social sciences award

The Dr Hendrik Muller Prize for Behavioural and Social Sciences is awarded every other year by the Royal Netherlands Academy of Arts and Sciences to a researcher or group of researchers who has made a significant or valuable contribution to the behavioural and social sciences. The award is named after Hendrik Pieter Nicolaas Muller (1859–1941), a Dutch businessman and diplomat.

== Winners ==
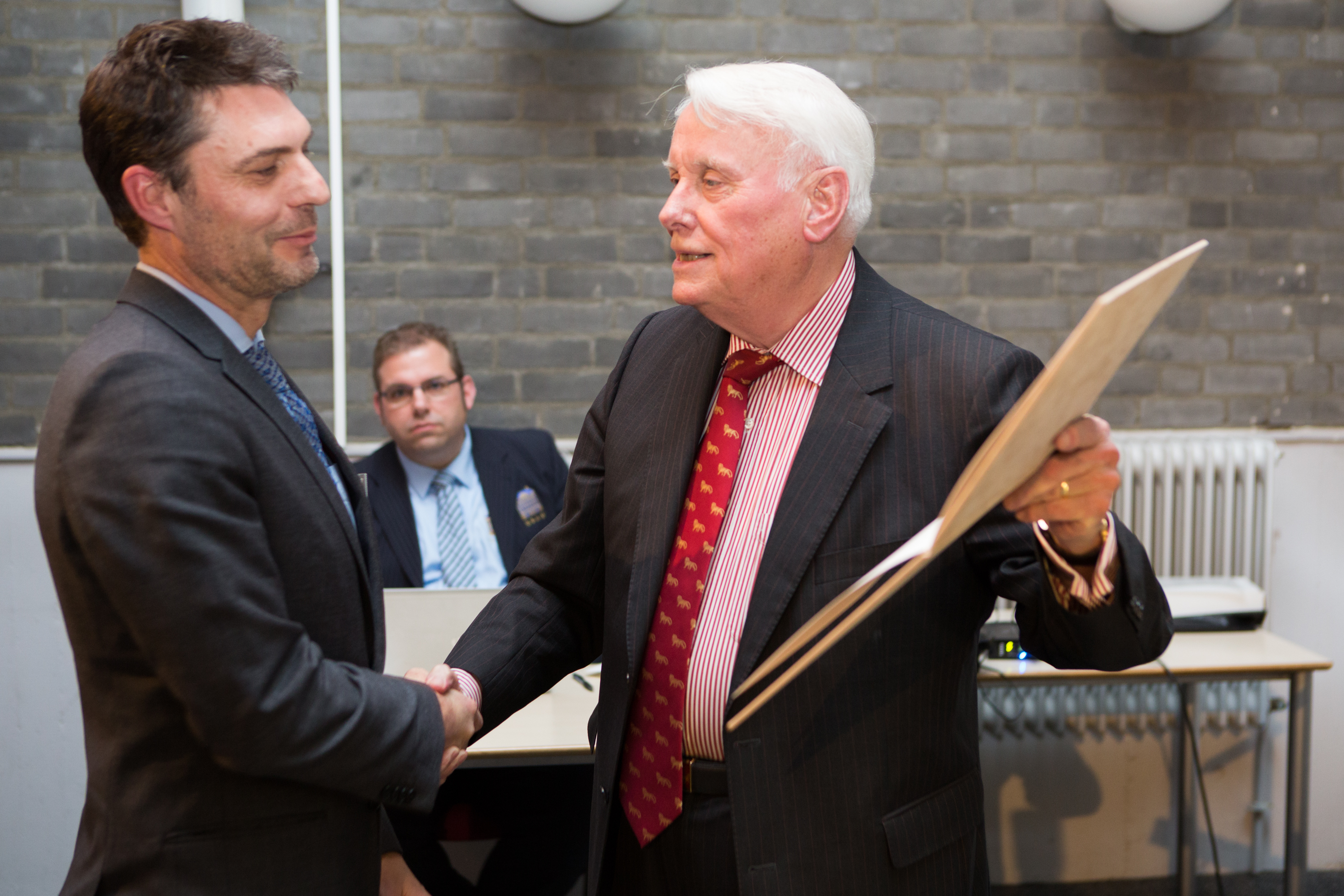
2015 ceremony

- Arend Lijphart (1991)
- Willem Levelt (1993)
- Willem Buiter (1995)
- Wout Ultee (1997)
- Piet Rietveld (1999)
- Peter van der Veer (2001)
- Peter Hagoort (2003)
- Jan-Benedict Steenkamp (2005)
- Michel Wedel (2005)
- Marc Groenhuijsen (2007)
- Dorret Boomsma (2009)
- Patti Valkenburg (2011)
- Marinus van IJzendoorn (2013)
- Carsten de Dreu (2015)
- Eveline Crone (2017)
- Raf de Bont (2019)
- Nadine Akkerman (2021)
- Loes Keijsers (2023)

== See also ==
- List of social sciences awards
