= Carsten de Dreu =

Dutch psychologist

Carsten Karel Willem de Dreu (born 6 July 1966, Borger) is a Professor at the University of Groningen. He previously taught social psychology at Leiden University and Behavioral Economics at the University of Amsterdam. He is member of the Royal Netherlands Academy of Arts and Sciences and research affiliate at the German Primate Center in Gottingen.

De Dreu received his PhD in social and organizational psychology from the University of Groningen (1993) and was president of the European Association of Social Psychology (2008 – 2011) and the International Association for Conflict Management (2000 – 2002). In 2016 he was named Distinguished Research Fellow at the University of Oxford.

== Research ==
De Dreu works at the intersection of social psychology, (neuro)biology, and behavioral economics. He studies the mechanisms and functions of creativity, and cooperation and conflict within and between groups, including negotiation and conflict resolution, and group decision making. His research uses a mixture of laboratory experiments, organizational field studies, and meta-analyses. With Laurie Weingart and Evert van de Vliert, he conducted pioneering work on the influence of different types of conflict—whether task or relationship focused—on team performance, innovation, and job satisfaction. Furthermore, he uncovered a key role for social preferences in predicting successful negotiation and dispute resolution. With Matthijs Baas and Bernard Nijstad he developed the Dual Pathway to Creativity Model, which predicts creative cognition and performance as the result of loose, flexible thinking on the one hand, and persistent, effortful processing on the other. His most recent work focuses on attack-defense dynamics during intergroup conflict and the neurohormonal bases of self-sacrifice. Using behavioral game theory and neuroscience methods, he showed how the hypothalamic neuropeptide oxytocin modulates self-sacrifice and defensive aggression in human decision-making during intergroup conflict.

== Awards and honors ==
- Outstanding Dissertation Award, International Association for Conflict Management (1994)
- Jos Jaspers Early Career Award, European Association of Social Psychology (1996)
- Most influential Article Award (with Laurie Weingart), Academy of Management (2009)
- Fellow, Society for Industrial and Organizational Psychology, 2009
- Fellow, Association for Psychological Science, 2010
- William A Owens Scholarly Achievement Award (with Michele J. Gelfand), Society for Industrial and Organizational Psychology (2014)
- Member, Royal Netherlands Academy of Arts and Sciences, 2012
- Kurt Lewin Medal, European Association of Social Psychology (2014)
- Dr Hendrik Muller Prize, Royal Netherlands Academy of Arts and Sciences 2015
- Ed and Carole Diener Award for Social Psychology (2017); Society for Personality and Social Psychology
- European Research Council Advanced Grant (2018)
- Spinoza Award (2018). Netherlands Science Foundation (NWO) (https://www.nwo.nl/en/nwo-spinoza-prize-2018).
- Humboldt Forschungspreis 2024. Alexander von Humboldt Stiftung

== Key publications ==
- De Dreu, C.K.W., Weingart, L.R., & Kwon, S. (2000). "Influence of social motives on integrative negotiation: A meta-analytical review and test of two theories." Journal of Personality and Social Psychology, 78, 889–905.
- De Dreu, C.K.W., & Weingart, L.R. (2003). "Task Versus Relationship Conflict, Team Performance and Team Member Satisfaction: A Meta-analysis." Journal of Applied Psychology, 88, 741–749.
- De Dreu, C.K.W. (2006). "When too much and too little hurts: Evidence for a curvilinear relationship between task conflict and innovation in teams." Journal of Management, 32, 83 – 107.
- De Dreu, C.K.W., Nijstad, B.A., & Van Knippenberg, D. (2008). "Motivated information processing in group judgment and decision making." Personality and Social Psychology Review, 12, 22 – 49.
- De Dreu, C.K.W., Greer, L.L., Handgraaf. M.J.J., Shalvi, S., Van Kleef, G.A., Baas, M., Ten Velden, F.S., Van Dijk, E., & Feith, S.W.W. (2010). "The neuropeptide oxytocin regulates parochial altruism in intergroup conflict among humans." Science, 328, 1408 - 1411.
