= Private Label Strategy =

2007 business book

Private Label Strategy: How to Meet the Store Brand Challenge
- Author: Nirmalya Kumar and Jan-Benedict Steenkamp
- Language: English
- Subject: Economics
- Publisher: Harvard Business School Press
- Publication date: 2007
- ISBN: 978-1422101674
- OCLC: 935513164

Private Label Strategy: How to Meet the Store Brand Challenge is a 2007 business book by Nirmalya Kumar and Jan Benedict Steenkamp. This book describes the strategies for private labels that major retailers are using, and analyses how major national brands can mount a response.

== Publication ==
The book was published in 2007. Sales of the book, priced at $35, reached 12,000 units in a span of 10 months. A Chinese translation of the book was published in 2007. By the end of 2007, the book also was being translated into Portuguese, Russian, and Spanish.

== Reception ==
In a positive review, Financial Times reviewer Stefan Stern wrote that Private Label Strategy "does usefully succeed in marking out the territory in which own-label goods and premium brands are doing battle". He praised the book for providing "a thorough analysis of the strategic and tactical options that are open to all the players in this market". Writing in the Indian Journal of Marketing, Ruchita Pangriya lauded the book for being "well structured for reading", saying it "gives a great understanding regarding the growth and development phases of private labels and how these brands are posing a challenge to the manufacturer brands". D. Bruce Merrifleid of Supply House Times called the book "well-researched, well-written and comprehensive".
