= Peter Hagoort =

Dutch neuroscientist (born 1954)

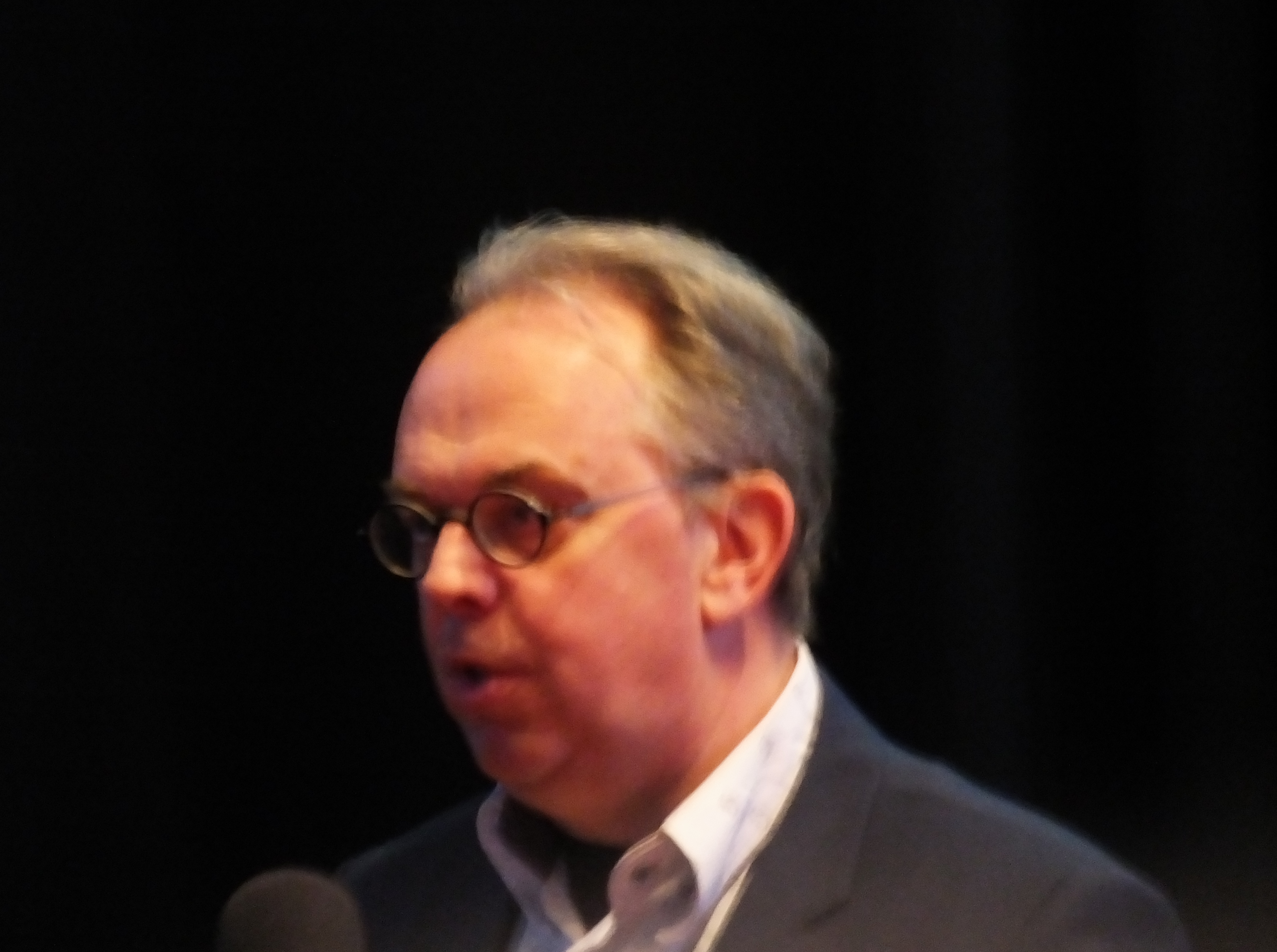
- Born: January 19, 1954 (age 72); Oudewater, the Netherlands
- Education: Utrecht University; Radboud University Nijmegen
- Scientific career
- Institutions: Radboud University Nijmegen; Max Planck Institute for Psycholinguistics
- Doctoral advisor: Willem Levelt
- Website: www.mpi.nl/people/hagoort-peter

Peter Hagoort (born January 19, 1954) is a Dutch neuroscientist who studies the neurobiology of language.

== Education and career ==
Hagoort was born in Oudewater and studied psychology and biology at Utrecht University and experimental psychology at Radboud University Nijmegen, where he received his doctorate in 1990 under the supervision of Willem Levelt. He then worked as a project manager at the Max Planck Institute for Psycholinguistics in Nijmegen. He has been a professor at the Institute for Cognition and Informatics of the Radboud University Nijmegen since 1999. He is a founding director of the Donders Centre for Cognitive Neuroimaging in Nijmegen and also a director at the Max Planck Institute for Psycholinguistics in Nijmegen since 2006.

His group uses imaging techniques such as PET, MEG and functional MRI to study language processing in the brain. For example, he examined how patients with language disorders (such as patients with aphasia, dyslexia, autism) compensate for them in other ways. He studied the processes involved in speaking and found that subjects know the grammatical form of a word around 40 milliseconds earlier than the first syllable and that another 120 milliseconds pass before the complete pronunciation is ready. His research is also concerned with the interaction of linguistic functions with others (such as gestures) and has also examined other cognitive abilities and the social implications of cognitive neuroscience.

== Honors and awards ==
In 2005, Hagoort received the Spinoza Prize and in 2008 the Heymans Prize. He was elected a member of the Royal Netherlands Academy of Sciences (KNAW) in 2004. In 2003 he received the KNAW Hendrik Muller Prize and became a KNAW Academy Professor in 2012. In 2004, Hagoort became a Knight of the Order of the Netherlands Lion. He holds an honorary doctorate from the University of Glasgow and is a member of the Academia Europaea since 2012. In 2018, Hagoort was elected an international member of the National Academy of Sciences.
