= Brand Breakout =

Brand Breakout: How Emerging Market Brands Will Go Global
- Author: Nirmalya Kumar and Jan-Benedict Steenkamp
- Language: English
- Subject: branding
- Genre: business
- Publisher: Palgrave Macmillan
- Publication date: 2013
- ISBN: 978-1137467591

Brand Breakout: How Emerging Market Brands Will Go Global is a book by Nirmalya Kumar and Jan-Benedict Steenkamp. This book looks at what emerging market brands need to do to succeed in global markets. It has been rated as one of the best business books of 2013.

== See also ==
- Diaspora Marketing
