= Gary Dell =

American cognitive scientist

Gary S Dell
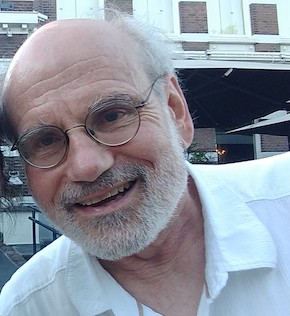
- Born: 1950 (age 75–76)
- Education: University of Toronto; Swarthmore College
- Scientific career
- Workplaces: University of Illinois at Urbana–Champaign University of Rochester Dartmouth College
- Thesis: Phonological and lexical encoding in speech production: An analysis of naturally occurring and experimentally elicited speech errors (1980)
- Website: https://psychology.illinois.edu/directory/profile/gdell

Gary S. Dell (born 1950) is an American psycholinguist. He is Professor Emeritus of Psychology and Center for Advanced Study Professor at the University of Illinois at Urbana-Champaign.

== Early life and education ==
Dell is from Delaware. He graduated from Alexis I. duPont High School in 1968; his senior yearbook noted "What little he says is well worth listening to." Following undergraduate studies at Swarthmore College he received his doctoral degree from the University of Toronto. His thesis, supervised by Peter Reich, used spontaneous and experimentally-induced speech errors to investigate the cognitive processes underlying language production, focusing on the retrieval and planning of words and sounds.

== Career ==
After a post-doctoral fellowship at Dartmouth College, Dell joined the University of Rochester as an assistant professor in 1982 and was promoted to associate professor in 1986. In 1989, he moved to the University of Illinois at Urbana-Champaign, where he is affiliated with the Departments of Psychology, Linguistics, the Beckman Institute for Advanced Science and Technology, and the Center for Advanced Study.

== Research ==
Dell studies the mental processes used to produce and understand language. He studies these processes in experiments where participants produce speech errors under controlled laboratory conditions, expanding on the traditional approach of studying naturally occurring errors by researchers such as Sigmund Freud and Victoria Fromkin. His research provided some of the first evidence against the claim that producing speech relies on discretely separated, independent processing modules. This motivated Dell to develop theoretical proposals and neural network models that explicitly incorporated interaction between different mental processes. These models have successfully predicted both qualitative and quantitative aspects of speech error patterns, including speech errors occurring after brain damage resulting in aphasia. His work has served as a cornerstone of key theoretical debates in the field, particularly in contrast to more recent modular proposals by researchers such as Willem Levelt.

== Honors and awards ==
In 1987, Dell received the American Psychological Association Early Career Award. He is a Fellow of the Association for Psychological Science, Cognitive Science Society, American Association for the Advancement of Science, and Society of Experimental Psychologists. In 2015, he was elected to the American Academy of Arts and Sciences and the National Academy of Sciences.
