= Paolo Schianchi =

Italian architect and designer

Paolo Schianchi (born 22 January 1966), is an Italian architect and designer.

He has taught at the Politecnico di Milano, and is a leading representatives and theorist of Visual marketing a branch of study that connects image and product.

== Career ==
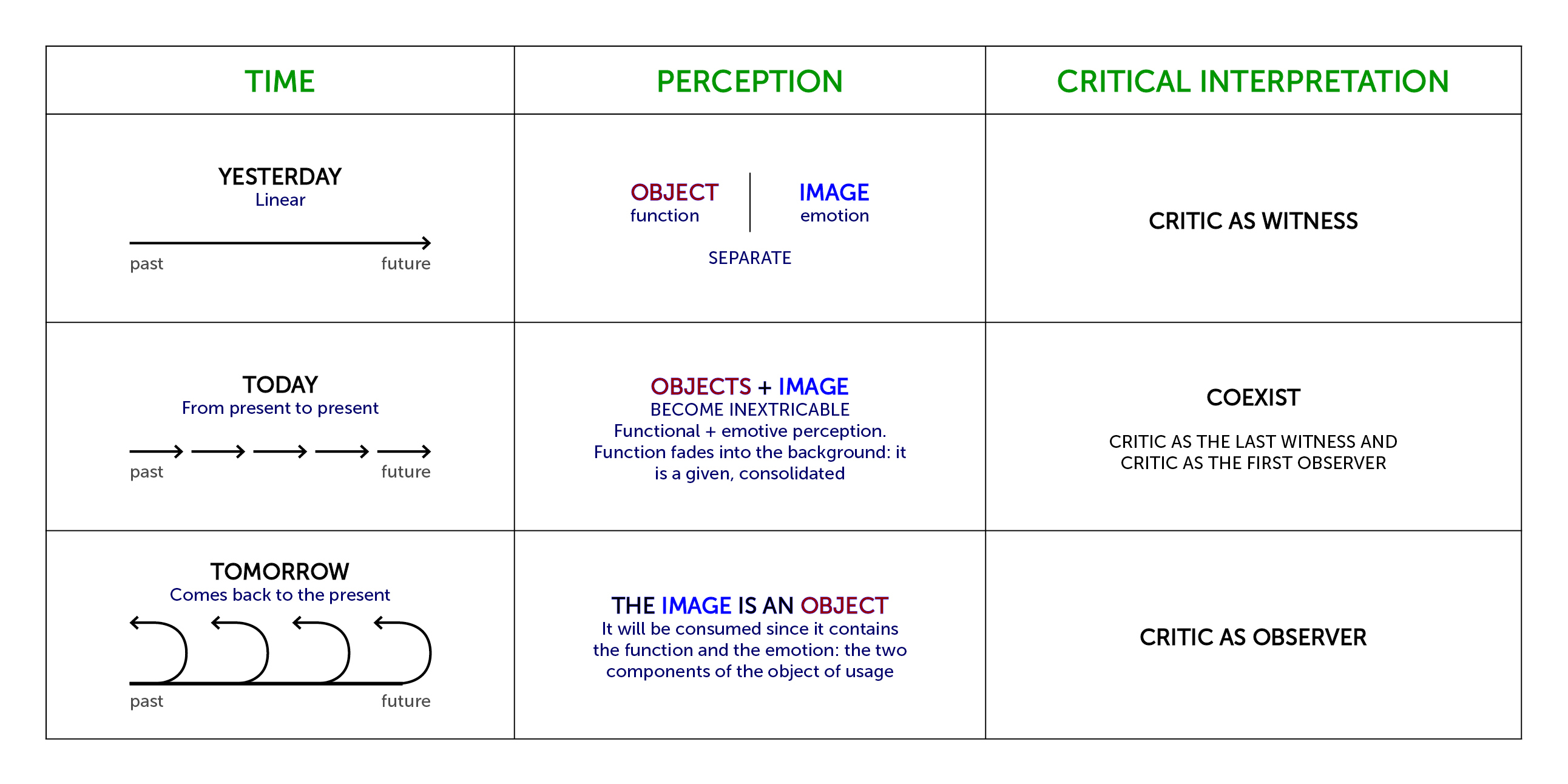
Table showing the evolution of Visual Marketing in terms of Time-Perception-Critical interpretation – Paolo Schianchi

Born in Parma, Schianchi has a degree in architecture and studied aesthetics; he became interested in visual marketing in the late Nineties, then in the following decade he explored it more deeply and began to divulge it: the focal point of his theory is the fact that an object and its image cannot be separated. During his ongoing involvement in many exhibitions (with Ente PadovaFiere, to mention one), Schianchi's focus had always been on how objects tend to take on the identity of their visual display, also as proof of their indissoluble ties.

In the exhibition, "La filosofia dell'acqua. Il design italiano incontra l'artigiano giapponese" (The Philosophy of Water. Italian Design meets Japanese Handcraft), held in Milan and Padua from April to October 2011, Paolo Schianchi visually demonstrated that "an object is no longer the technical response to a necessary function, but the sum of the image, function and emotions with which it is branded (...)". The exhibition was organised with the collaboration of the Japanese Consulate in Milan, the Italian Consulate in Osaka, the Centre of Japanese Culture in Milan and the Chamber of commerce of Kyoto.

He has edited the annual publications for the Gruppo 24 ORE - Gruppo 24 Ore Business Media group, focusing on research into new developments of the object in relation to its visual image.
Schianchi is a designer, art director, and works with Italian and international companies (Runtal Zehnder, Magma, Disegno Ceramica, Il Marmo); he was also editor for a number of magazines (Archaedilia by Faenza Editrice, Ce International Superfici In&Out for Il Sole 24 Ore Business Media). Since 2010 he is director of an international Website focussing on architecture and design, Floornature. Apart from teaching at the Milan Polytechnic he is also professor for the Masters course of Integrated Communication and Design at the IUSVE (Department of Salesian Pontifical University of Venice) in Mestre and regularly lectures with other universities and private institutions.

== Publications ==
- Il Bi-Design, Faenza Editrice, 2004
- Nuovamente anonimi, Gruppo 24 ORE|Il Sole 24 Ore Business Media, 2007
- Verso il bagno Camp, Il Sole 24 Ore Business Media, 2008
- Diseno y bano: un binomio entre imagen y objeto, in Diseno y Arquitectura, Faenza Ed. Iberica, 2008
- Il sogno e la realtà spunti per una nuova definizione di design, Il Sole 24 Ore Business Media, 2009
- Nuvole di estetica e prodotto, ISRE Edizioni Salesiane, 2010
- Visual marketing. in B & A n. 247, Il Sole 24 Ore, 2011
- L'immagine è un oggetto, libreriauniversitaria.it edizioni, Padua 2013, ISBN 978-88-6292-413-9
- Architecture on the web. A critical approach to communication, libreriauniversitaria.it edizioni, Padua 2014, ISBN 88-6292-544-1
- Webcreativity: Creatività e Visual Marketing post-web, Dario Flaccovio Editore, Palermo 2016, ISBN 978-88-5790-546-4
- Paolo Schianchi non-esiste, Dario Flaccovio Editore, Palermo 2017, ISBN 978-88-5790-756-7
- Visual Journalist. L'immagine è la notizia, FrancoAngeli, Milano 2018. ISBN 978-88-9176-993-0

== Bibliography ==
- path, A journal on research, conservation and related issues in architecture and the architectural heritage, ed. Museum Alvar Aalto, Jyväskylä, n. 2, page 9 1997
- MODO, Disegni di pietra edited by P. Olivari, n. 188, year XXI, April, S.76-77 ed. MODO, Milan 1998
- MODO, Progettare la materia, edited by P. Olivari, n. 192, year XXI, Oktober, S.74-75 ed. MODO, Milan, 1998
- La Repubblica, Ecco la casa New Age dove la porta è vietata. Gli Oggetti, edited by Linda De Sanctis, n. 38, year XXIV, 14 February, S. 27, 1999
- L’altro design, edited by P. Olivari - Exhibition catalogue, at Fachhochschule Hochschule für Stuttgart technik, Stuttgart 21 October - 10 November, Spatia Edizioni Milan
- Abitare, Nuovi Bagni, n. 401, Dezember, S. 185, ed. Abitare Segesta, Milan, 2000
- DOBRE Wnetrze, "Wulkan w tazience", n. 2 (38), Februar, S. 10–11, Ed. DPA Printing Company, Krakau 2001
- Corriere della Sera, Avanza il telelavoro, le case diventano uffici, edited by Daniela Camboni, 1 June, S. 21.
- L’Espresso, E il lavorar m’è dolce in questa casa, edited by Sabina Minardi, anno XLVII, 21 June, page 76, publishing group L’Espresso
- Francisco Asenio Carver, Mòveis de Casa, Ed. Atrium Grup, Mexiko-New York-Barcelona, page 470–471.
- AYD, Arte y disegño, Agua y jabòn, April 2002, S. 46–53, Edizioni Elistil, Montevideo
- M. Fucci, Herausgeber von: Corian. La creatività comincia in Casa, Corian catalogue, Edition Du Pont de Nemours International, Brussels 2003, pages 18–19.
- Ottagono, Luci e rubinetti a Padova, Nr. 166, Jahrgang XXXVIII, Dezember 2003, S. 30, ed. Compositori, Bologna.
- L’Espresso, Design. Vizi molto privati, Jahrgang L, 29. January, page 139, publishing group L’Espresso
- Domus, Tratto, n. 910, January 2008, page 180, Editoriale Domus Milan.
- Interni, Disegno Ceramica. Pensieri D'acqua, n. 592, June, page 60, Mondadori Editore, Milan
- Area, Tratto in ceramica, n. 106, October, Federico Motta Editore, Milan
- Area, D. Cattaneo, Pensieri d'acqua, n. 110, June 2010, Federico Motta Editore, Milan
