= Antje Meyer =

German experimental psychologist

- Born: 15 December 1957 (age 68); Hemer, West Germany

Academic background
- Education: Catholic University of Nijmegen (now Radboud University)
- Thesis: Phonological encoding in language production: A priming study (1988)

Academic work
- Discipline: Psychologist
- Sub-discipline: Language production
- Institutions: Max Planck Institute for Psycholinguistics; Radboud University

Antje Susanne Meyer (born 15 December 1957, Hemer, West Germany) is a German-Dutch experimental psychologist, known for her work in language production. She is currently one of the scientific directors of the Max Planck Institute for Psycholinguistics in Nijmegen, the Netherlands, and also a professor of individual differences in language processing at Radboud University.

Meyer was elected member of the Royal Netherlands Academy of Arts and Sciences (KNAW) in 2018. In 2018 she also became a member of the German Academy of Sciences Leopoldina.

== Notable publications ==
- Meijer, Antje S. (2006). Automaticity and Control in Language Processing. Advances in Behavioural Brain Science. Psychology Press. ISBN 1841696501.
