= Max Planck Institute for Psycholinguistics =

Dutch institute in Nijmegen

Coordinates: 51°49′04.53″N 5°51′25.65″E

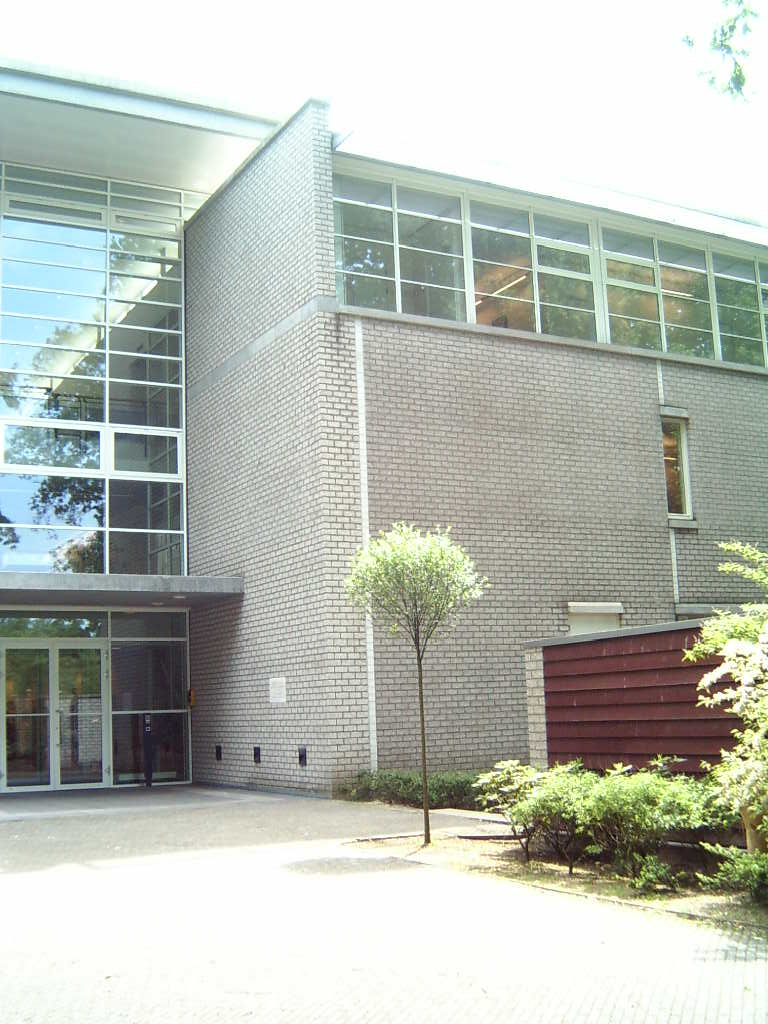
- Institute headquarters at Nijmegen, the Netherlands
- Formation: 1980; 46 years ago
- Type: Scientific Institute
- Purpose: Research in psycholinguistics
- Headquarters: Nijmegen, Gelderland, the Netherlands
- Parent organization: Max Planck Society
- Website: (in English) (in German) (in Dutch)

The Max Planck Institute for Psycholinguistics (German: Max-Planck-Institut für Psycholinguistik; Dutch: Max Planck Instituut voor Psycholinguïstiek) is a research institute located on the campus of Radboud University Nijmegen in Nijmegen, Gelderland, the Netherlands. The institute was founded in 1980 by Dutch psycholinguist Pim Levelt and is dedicated exclusively to psycholinguistics. It is one of the few institutes of the Max Planck Society situated outside Germany. According to the ranking of Web of World Research Centers, the institute ranks second amongst all Max Planck Institutes (MPI) in terms of visibility and eighth in terms of size.

== Research ==
The institute specializes in language comprehension, language production, language acquisition, language and genetics, and the relation between language and cognition. Its mission is to undertake basic research into the psychological, social, and biological foundations of language. The goal is to understand how human minds and brains process language, how language interacts with other aspects of mind, and how to learn languages of quite different types. The MPI for Psycholinguistics is a globally recognized center of linguistics and presents with its international archive of endangered languages a significant contribution to the preservation of the common heritage of mankind. Offering about 50 projects on the Internet, the archive has been sponsored since 2000 by the Volkswagen Foundation.

== Current departments ==
The MPI for Psycholinguistics has four primary organizational units besides research groups: Language and Genetics, Language Development, Neurobiology of Language, and Psychology of Language.

=== Language and Genetics ===
Established in October 2010, the language and genetics department is headed by Simon E. Fisher. The department takes advantage of the latest innovations in molecular methods to discover how the human genome helps to build a language-ready brain. It aims to uncover the DNA variations, which ultimately affect different facets of human communicative abilities, not only in children with language-related disorders but also in the general population. Its work attempts to bridge the gaps between genes, brains, speech, and language, by integrating molecular findings with data from other levels of analysis, including cell biology, experimental psychology, and neuroimaging. In addition, it hopes to trace the evolutionary history and worldwide diversity of key genes, which may shed new light on language origins.

=== Language Development ===
The original Language Acquisition Department (1980-2015) investigated processes of language acquisition and use. The department combined attention to both first and second languages, researching production as well as comprehension of speakers of different ages and cultures, and the developmental relationship between language and cognition. The focus was on morpho-syntax, semantics, and discourse structure. Headed by Wolfgang Klein, Language Acquisition previously launched three institute projects: Information Structure in Language Acquisition, Categories in Language and Cognition, and Multimodal Interaction. Clive Perdue was the scientific coordinator of the program Second Language Acquisition by Adult Immigrants, whose results, published in the early 1990s, proposed that second language acquisition proceeds along three stages: pre-basic variety (or nominal utterance organisation), basic variety (or infinite utterance organisation), and post-basic variety (or finite utterance organisation).

The Language Acquisition Department returned in 2016 as the Language Development Department, headed by Caroline F. Rowland.

=== Neurobiology of Language ===
The Neurobiology of Language Department, headed by Peter Hagoort, focuses on the study of language production, language comprehension, and language acquisition from a cognitive neuroscience perspective. This includes using neuroimaging, behavioral, and virtual reality techniques to investigate the language system and its neural underpinnings. Research facilities at the MPI include a high-density electroencephalography (EEG) lab, a virtual reality laboratory, and several behavioral laboratories. Having a part of the department stationed at the Donders Institute for Brain, Cognition and Behaviour, Centre for Cognitive Neuroimaging, it has access to a whole-head 275-channel MEG system, MRI scanners at 1.5, 3 and 7 tesla, a TMS lab, and several additional EEG laboratories.

=== Psychology of Language ===
The Psychology of Language Department, headed by Antje S. Meyer, identifies characteristics of the cognitive system that determine behavior in a broad range of linguistic tasks and the relationships between language production, comprehension, and learning via speaking, listening, and cognition. The department also studies variability in adult language production and comprehension. Using various approaches, the Psychology of Language utilizes a combination of experimental and correlational work and inclusion of diverse samples of participants. With such methods, it has close links to the Language and Genetics and Neurobiology of Language departments.

== Former Departments ==
=== Language and Cognition ===
The Language and Cognition Department (1994-2017), headed by Stephen C. Levinson, investigated the relationship between language, culture, and general cognition, making use of the natural laboratory of language variation. In this way, the research aimed to bring the perspective of language diversity to a range of central problems in the language sciences. Languages were described (sometimes for the first time) based on field data. These field experiments helped to extend the corpora (a.k.a. digital archive) of natural language research. The department used a diversity of methods that spanned many area, including linguistic description, ethnography, child development perspectives, psycholinguistic experimentation, conversation analysis, corpus statistics, brain imaging, phylogenetics, and linguistic data mining. The department's overarching research focus was on typology within interactional linguistics.

=== Language Comprehension ===
The Language Comprehension Department (1993-2013), headed by Anne Cutler, undertook empirical investigation and computational modeling of the understanding of spoken language. Until 2009, the work within the department was largely divided between two research projects: decoding continuous speech and phonological learning for speech perception; thereafter, most work was in the project called Mechanisms and Representations in Comprehending Speech. This project focused on core theoretical issues in speech comprehension such as on how episodic memories (e.g., hearing someone speak in an unfamiliar dialect) influence the speech perception system, or how prior knowledge about one's language (phonotactic probabilities, lexical knowledge, frequent versus infrequent word combinations) is used during perception.

== Independent Research Groups ==
=== Communication before Language ===
This MPI research group, headed by Daniel Haun, investigates the social and cognitive foundations of human communication in infancy, specifically focusing on infants' developing social cognition and social motivation in relation to their emerging prelinguistic communication within social and cultural contexts. Their work is motivated by the idea that there is a psychological basis of human communication that develops ontogenetically prior to language and can be first expressed in gestures.

=== Evolutionary Processes in Language and Culture ===
Started in 2009, the research group investigates language diversity and change as part of an integrated cultural evolutionary system. Headed by Michael Dunn, the group takes a modern evolutionary perspective, using computational tools from genetics and biology, and integrating probabilistic, quantified approaches to phylogenetics with rigorous tests of different models of the interaction between elements of language, contact and geography, and cultural variation.

=== Syntax, Typology and Information Structure ===
The research group, headed by Robert D. Van Valin, Jr., tries to determine the role of information structure in explaining cross-linguistic differences in grammatical systems out of the idea that the interaction of pragmatics and grammar happens on several levels and differs from language to language. Another major task of the group is to investigate and re-evaluate the status of the information structure primitives (topic, focus, contrast, etc.) as cross-linguistically valid categories. To achieve this, the members of the group combine extensive corpus analysis of the data in their respective languages with production experiments; all findings are further cross-checked through standard information structure tests (question-answer pairs, aboutness tests, association with focus-sensitive items).
