= Nirmalya Kumar =

Indian academic

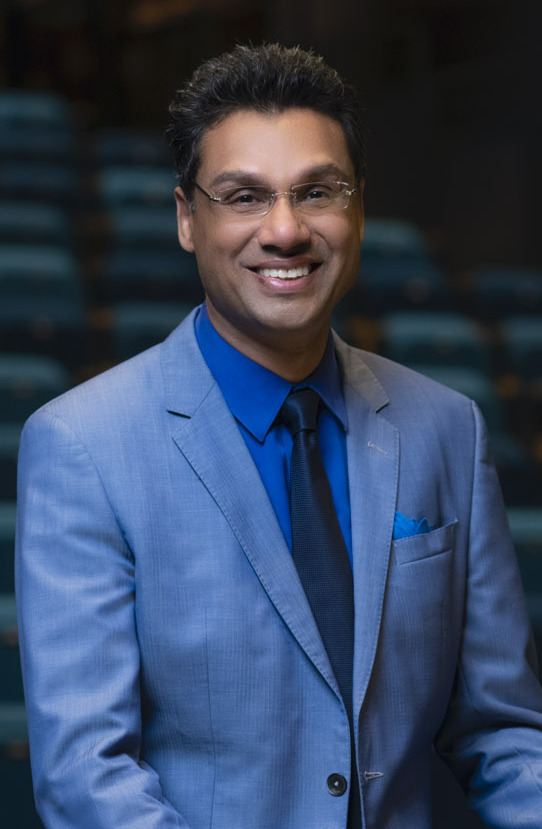
- Education: MCom, MBA, PhD
- Alma mater: Calcutta University, Shivaji University, University of Illinois at Chicago, Kellogg School of Management in Northwestern University
- Occupation: Professor
- Organization: Singapore Management University

Nirmalya Kumar is an Indian academic and professor. He is currently a professor of marketing at Singapore Management University's Lee Kong Chian School of Business, and previously served on the bards of ACC Limited, Ambuja Cements, Bata India, Tata Chemicals, UltraTech Cement, and Zensar Technologies.

== Biography ==
=== Career ===
From 1991 to 1994, Kumar was assistant professor of marketing at The Pennsylvania State University. From 1995 to 2003, he was professor of marketing at International Institute for Management Development. From 2003 to 2013, he was professor of marketing at London Business School. From 2013 to 2016, he was a member-group executive council and head of strategy at the Tata Group. Since 2017, Kumar has been a Lee Kong Chian professor of marketing at Singapore Management University and a Distinguished Fellow at INSEAD Emerging Markets Institute.

=== Art collection ===
Kumar owns the largest collection of Jamini Roy Paintings outside of India. He is considered a "specialist" on the Bengal School of Art rebel artists. In 2013, he was recognized for his efforts on behalf of South Asian art with an Honorary Fellowship by SOAS University of London.

== Publications ==
- Nirmalya Kumar (2004). Marketing as Strategy: Understanding the CEO's Agenda for Driving Growth and Innovation. Harvard Business School Press. ISBN 9781591392101.
- Nirmalya Kumar (2005). Global Marketing. BusinessWorld.
- Nirmalya Kumar; Jan-Benedict Steenkamp (2007). Private Label Strategy: How to Meet the Store Brand Challenge. Harvard Business School Press.
- Nirmalya Kumar; James C. Anderson; James A. Narus (2007). Value Merchants: Demonstrating and Documenting Superior Value in Business Markets. Harvard Business School Press.
- Nirmalya Kumar (2009). India's Global Powerhouses: How They Are Taking on the World. Harvard Business School Press.
- Nirmalya Kumar and Phanish Puranam (2012). India Inside: The emerging innovation challenge to the West. Harvard Business Review Press.
- Nirmalya Kumar and Jan-Benedict Steenkamp (2013). Brand Breakout: How emerging market brands will go global. Palgrave.
- Nirmalya Kumar (2018). Thinking Smart: How to master work, life and everything in-between. Harper Collins India.
- Caterina Corni and Nirmalya Kumar (2019). Hemen Mazumdar: The Last Romantic. Singapore Management University.
- Nirmalya Kumar (2024). Clash: Amazon vs Walmart. Penguin Random House India.
