= Michel Wedel =

Dutch karateka

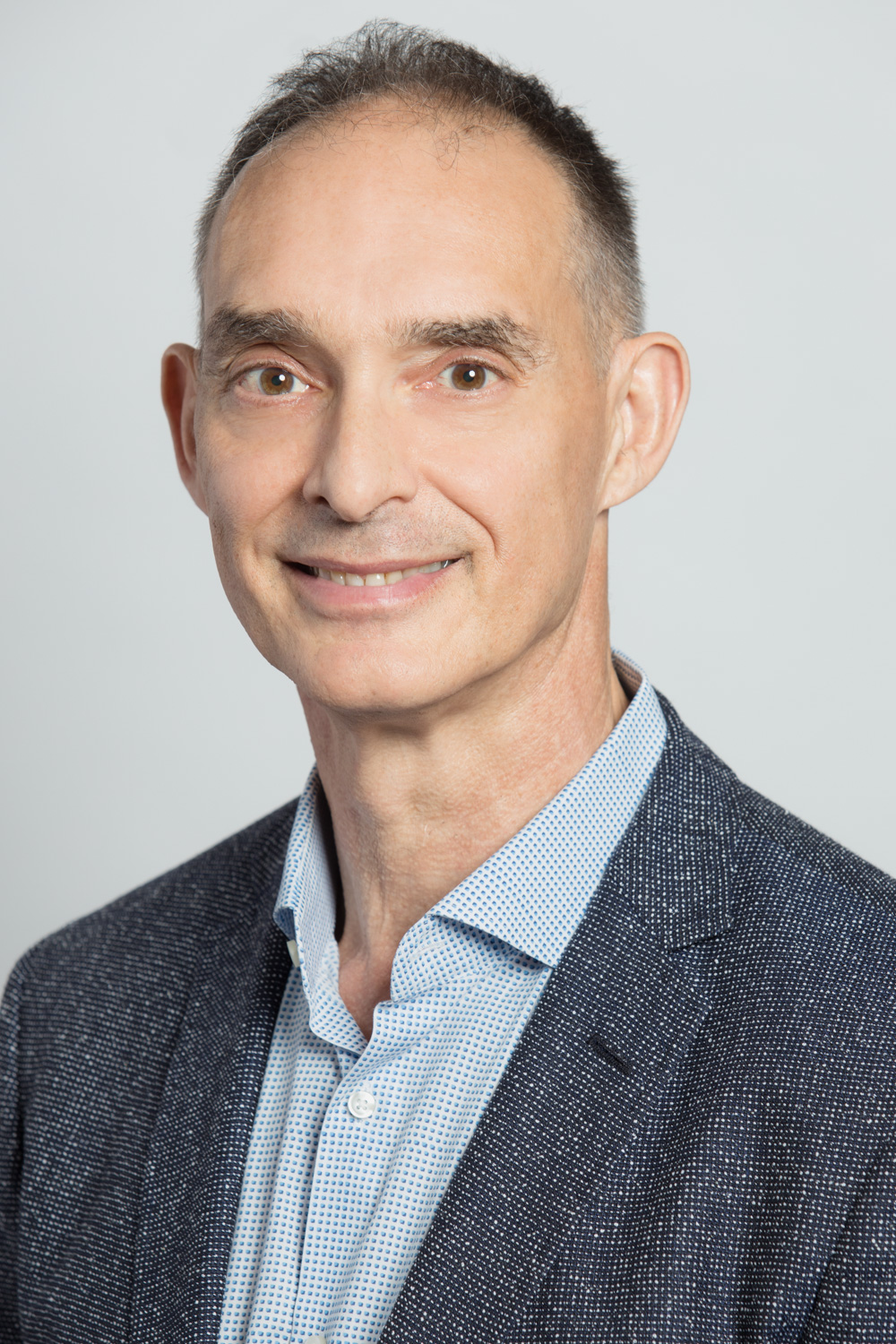
- Wedel in 2019
- Born: The Hague, Netherlands
- Occupation: Professor
- Known for: Market Segmentation, Eye Tracking
- Title: Pepsico Chaired Professor of Consumer Science
- Awards: -Hendrik Muller award Royal Netherlands Academy for the Sciences (2005); -Gilbert A. Churchill Marketing Research Award American Marketing Association (2008); -Charles C. Parlin Marketing Research Award American Marketing Association (2016); -Irwin-McGraw-Hill Distinguished Marketing Educator, American Marketing Association (2019); -Buck Weaver excellence in Marketing Science award INFORMS/ISMS (2019); -Ubbo Emmius Medal for Scientific Accomplishments, University of Groningen (2019); -Robert J Lavidge Global Marketing Research Award, American Marketing Association (2019); -Paul Converse Award, American Marketing Association (2020)

Academic background
- Education: Leiden University, Wageningen University
- Thesis: Clusterwise Regression and Market Segmentation (1990)

Academic work
- Discipline: Statistics, Marketing
- Institutions: Netherlands Organization for Applied Scientific Research (TNO); University of Groningen; University of Michigan; University of Maryland Robert H. Smith School of Business
- Website: scholar.rhsmith.umd.edu/wedel

Michel Wedel is the PepsiCo Chaired Professor of Consumer Science in the Robert H. Smith School of Business, and a Distinguished University Professor, at the University of Maryland, College Park. He works on the development of statistical and econometric methods to analyze and predict consumer behavior, in addition to market segmentation and eye tracking research.

== Education ==
Wedel holds an MS.C. in biomathematics from the University of Leiden. He has a Ph.D. in marketing from Wageningen University.

== Research ==
Wedel develops statistical and econometric methods for research in marketing, and applies these methods to support firms' decision-making. He has worked in the areas of market segmentation, advertising and promotions, visual marketing, multidimensional scaling, conjoint analysis, and big data analytics.

== Academic career ==
In 2003 Wedel was appointed as the Dwight F. Benton Professor of Marketing at the Ross School of Business at the University of Michigan, Ann Arbor, USA. In 2006 he moved to the Robert H. Smith School of Business at the University of Maryland, where he became the PepsiCo Chaired Professor of Consumer Science. Wedel has had visiting positions at the University of Michigan, the University of Groningen, Hong Kong University of Science and Technology, the University of New South Wales, and held the Henri Theil Visiting Chair in Marketing and Econometrics, at the Econometric Institute of Erasmus University in the Netherlands.

== Awards and honors ==
Wedel received the Dr. Hendrik Muller Prize from the Royal Dutch Academy of the Sciences for contributions to the social sciences, the Charles C. Parlin award for contributions to marketing research, the Gilbert A. Churchill Award for lifetime contributions to the study of marketing research, the Robert J Lavidge Global Marketing Research Award, the Irwin-McGraw-Hill Distinguished Marketing Educator Award, and the Paul D. Converse award for outstanding contributions to the science of marketing, all from the American Marketing Association.He received the Buck Weaver Award for excellence in rigor and relevance in marketing science from INFORMS. He is a fellow of the American Marketing Association, the American Statistical Association and the Institute for Operations Research and Management Science, Society for Marketing Science. The University of Groningen awarded him the 2019 Ubbo Emmius Medal, the University of Maryland has recognized him with the Distinguished Scholar Teacher Award and named him a Distinguished University Professor. the number one economist in the Netherlands, and number one Netherlands marketing scholar based on number of publications.

== Kyokushin karate career ==
Wedel holds a 5th dan in Kyokushin Karate and was a heavy-weight full contact karate competitor. He won the Dutch (open) full contact Karate championships nine times between 1978 and 1987. His only loss was to Gerard Gordeau (Netherlands) in the final in 1980. Wedel won the International Ibusz Oyama cup in Budapest (Hungary) in 1982 after beating Michael Thompson (England), won the open European Karate Championships in Alkmaar (Netherlands) in 1983 after beating Flemming Jinzen (Denmark). In 1985 he became second after losing to Andy Hug (Switzerland) in the Ibusz Oyama cup. He reclaimed that cup in 1986 after beating Gabor Peko (Hungary). He became the European heavyweight champion in Katowice (Poland) in 1987, after beating Michael Thompson (England) in the final. In 1986, together with Peter Smit, he participated in the 18th All Japan Tournament in Tokyo, where he was disqualified after beating Shinichi Sotodate (Japan). He participated in the 2nd (1979), 3rd (1983) and 4th (1987) World Open Karate Championships in Japan. In 1979 he was disqualified against Gary Klugiewicz (US). He lost to Akira Masuda (Japan) in 1983 and he lost to Ademir da Costa (Brazil) in 1987; finishing both times among the first 16 competitors. Out of his last 25 fights, Wedel lost one, was disqualified in one, won one by decision and won 22 by knock-out.

Wedel became the coach of the Dutch National Karate team (1988–1991). He wrote the book: "Kyokushin Karate: Training and Fighting" with Koen Scharrenberg, and made Kyokushin training instruction videos with Andy Hug. In 1994, he joined the democratic ShinKyokushin organization under leadership of Kenji Midori.
