= Hidesign =

Indian leather goods manufacturer

- Type: Private
- Industry: Retail
- Founded: 1979
- Headquarters: Puducherry, India
- Key people: Dilip Kapur, president
- Products: Leather Goods
- Website: hidesign.com

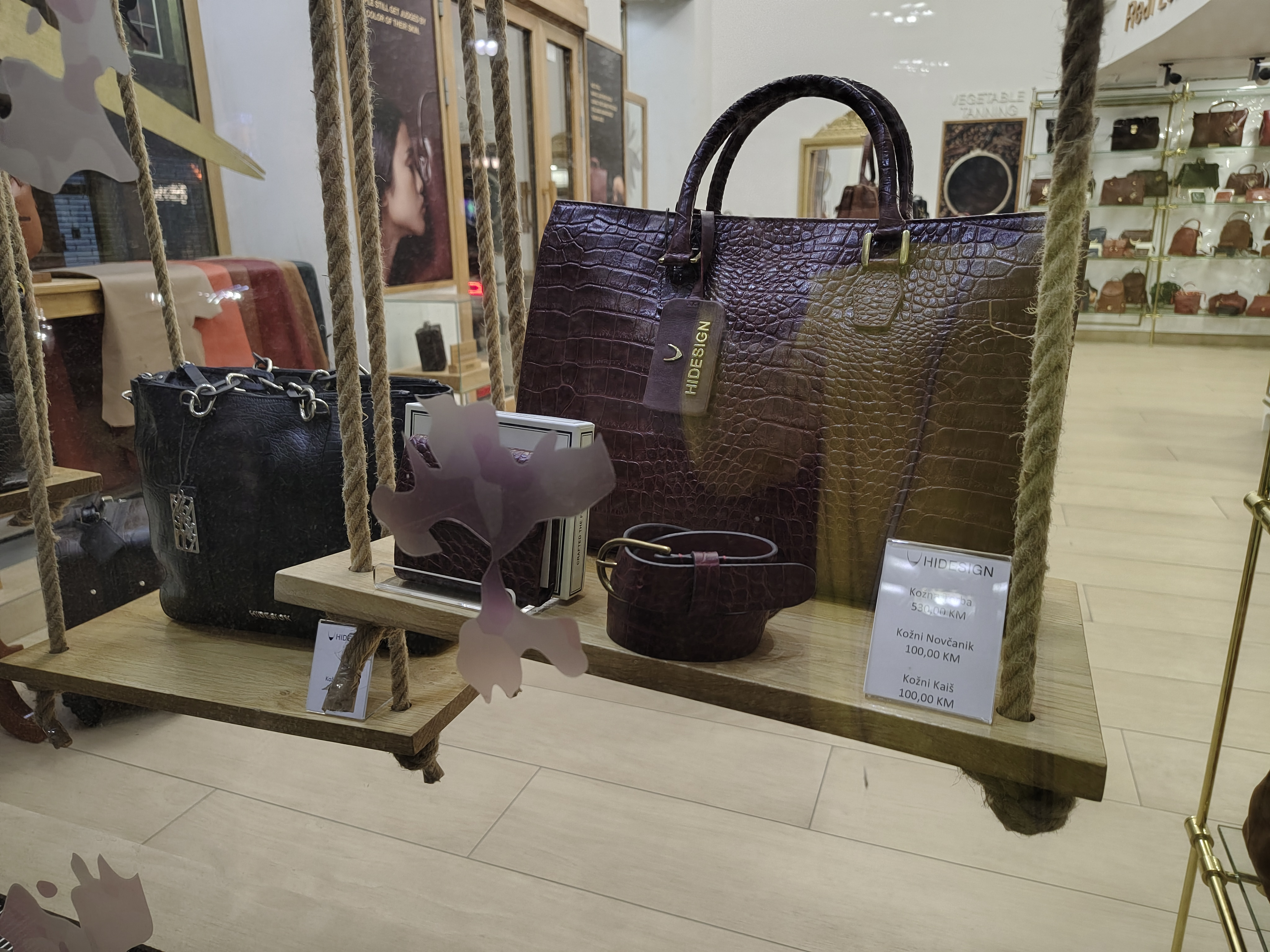
Hidesign store in Sarajevo, Bosnia

Hidesign is a leather goods manufacturer based in Pondicherry, India. In 2018, the company had operations in 24 countries including the United States, United Kingdom, Australia, Kenya, United Arab Emirates, Spain, Portugal, New Zealand and Sri Lanka. The leather goods segment of Hidesign contributes to 160 crore of revenue.

== Products ==
The company is the manufacturer and marketer of leather products including handbags, briefcases, laptop bags, travel bags, wallets, accessories, belts, jackets, shoes, footwear and sunglasses. It has 5 manufacturing facilities:

- Sikkim
- Baddi (Himachal Pradesh)
- Puducherry (Two facilities)
- Chennai (Tannery)

== History ==
Dilip Kapur (president) started Hidesign as a hobby. He had joined Princeton to do his PhD in International affairs and worked part time in a leather factory. In this factory, Kapur learned how to work with leather. He came back after completing his education and started buying leather from Chennai to design bags in Auroville. When a friend paid him INR 300 for a bag, he was surprised and decided to put more effort into it and started Hidesign with a capital of INR 25,000 and one cobbler. Through his friends and family, Hidesign reached Germany, Australia, England, and USA and scaled up. A German company called Welthungerhilfe placed an order for more than 1000 bags and helped with funds to support the delivery of the order. The company started producing for India only by the year 2000. Hidesign only had customers who were not going to mainstream stores. Hidesign reached mainstream stores only after 10 years.

During his work with leather with Denver, US, he got to know that the best supplier for high-quality vegetable-tanned leather that could be used for hand coloring was E.I. Leather. When he probed further, he found that E.I. stood for ‘East India’ and the leather was being procured 100 miles far from his own home town - Pondicherry. The technique used by E.I. leather was exhaustive and it involved keeping the hides soaked for 40 days in a combination of wattle bark and myrobalan seeds; then the hides were rubbed with pungam oil, a local oil that made leather more supple. When he returned and tried to find the E.I. leather, he got to know that most tanneries did not use the same technique anymore and have moved to chemically tanned leather for economical reasons which also contributed to the pollution. He decided to find the last remaining tanners who were still following the E.I. leather technique and to innovate further for ecological tanning. For buckles, he decided to choose brass over Zinc alloy and steel buckles despite that brass took more time and skill. He took inspiration from Hindu temples in India where brass was the preferred metal for Indian gods. The first bags that Hidesign was able to send to Europe and USA were ecological and natural and reflected craftsmanship and hence were able to establish themselves fast.

== Hidesign in India ==
The first store in India was opened in 1990 in Pondicherry. Post that, some stores were opened in Mumbai and Delhi. Over the course of 9 years, India became the biggest market for the company.

== Collaborations ==
- HidesignXKalki collection with theme 'She Loves Adventure’
- José Lévy for 'Pondicherry Paris Collection'
- Hidesign X Joy Kendi, dedicated to the Kenya's Maasai tribe

== Controversy ==
The first advertisement of the brand created a controversy that led to a ban from multiple shops and bans in media. The ad showed a naked black sailor with a white girl. The model in the ad was Mr. South Africa. The ban happened in Dubai, Abu Dhabi, South Africa and India. The company was accused of being obscene.

== Sustainability ==
Hidesign believes in sustainability and uses environment friendly vegetable tanned leather and brass buckles. No paints and pigments are used and nothing is burnt. The waste material is segregated and reused. The company also has an annual recycling initiative called 'The Art of Reuse' which uses scrapped material to come up with new designs.

== Awards and recognition ==
- South India's outstanding retailing icons at IFA 2017
- Gold for Best Art Direction (Creative) at Magzimise Awards 2018
- ‘Accessory of the Year’ award from the UK's Accessory Magazine in 1992 given by Princess Diana
