= Consumer innovativeness =

Consumer innovativeness is a construct that deals with how receptive consumers are to new products. Consumer innovativeness has been defined as a predisposition or propensity to buy or adopt new products or a preference for new and different experience.
