= Anne Cutler =

Australian psycholinguist and educator (1945–2022)

Anne Cutler FRS FASSA
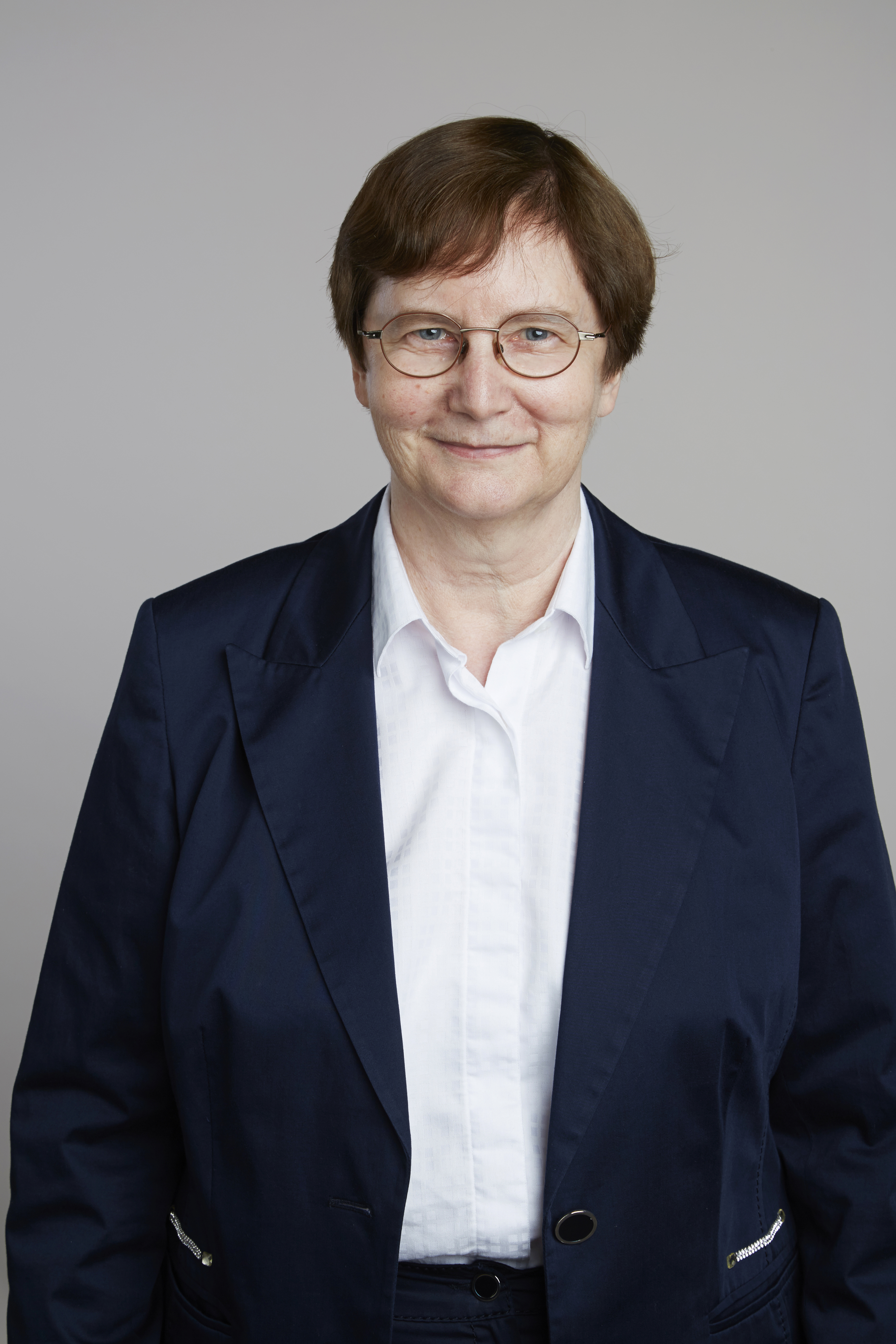
- Cutler in 2015
- Born: Elizabeth Anne Cutler; 17 January 1945; Melbourne, Victoria, Australia
- Died: 7 June 2022 (aged 77); Nijmegen, the Netherlands
- Education: University of Texas at Austin (PhD)
- Awards: Spinoza Prize (1999); Member of the National Academy of Sciences (2008); Fellow of the Royal Society (2016); Fellow of the British Academy (2020)
- Scientific career
- Fields: Psycholinguistics
- Workplaces: University of Western Sydney; Max Planck Institute for Psycholinguistics; Massachusetts Institute of Technology; University of Cambridge; Radboud University Nijmegen
- Thesis: Sentence stress and sentence comprehension (1975)
- Website: mpi.nl/people/cutler-anne

Elizabeth Anne Cutler FRS FBA FASSA (17 January 1945 – 7 June 2022) was an Australian psycholinguist, who served as director emeritus of the Max Planck Institute for Psycholinguistics. A pioneer in her field, Cutler's work focused on human listeners' recognition and decoding of spoken language. Following her retirement from the Max Planck Institute in 2012, she took a professorship at the MARCS Institute for Brain, Behaviour and Development, Western Sydney University.

== Early life and education ==
Elizabeth Anne Cutler was born on 17 January 1945 in Armadale, Victoria. She attended the University of Melbourne, and in 1964 received her Bachelor of Arts in Psychology and German. Two years later she received her Diploma of Education in Modern Languages, and in 1971 received her master's degree in German linguistics. Cutler embraced psycholinguistics when it emerged as an independent field, going on to complete her PhD in the discipline at the University of Texas at Austin with her dissertation Sentence stress and sentence comprehension.

== Career and research ==
After postdoctoral research fellowships at Massachusetts Institute of Technology (MIT) and the University of Sussex, she worked as a research scientist at the Medical Research Council (United Kingdom) (MRC) Applied Psychology Unit at the University of Cambridge. Subsequently, she became Professor of Comparative Psycholinguistics at Radboud University. In 1993, she became a Director at the Max Planck Institute for Psycholinguistics in Nijmegen, the Netherlands, and held that title until 2012.

Her research, summarised in the book Native Listening, centres on human listeners' recognition of spoken language, and in particular on how the brain's processes of decoding speech are shaped by language-specific listening experience.

=== Awards and honours ===
Cutler was elected a Fellow of the Royal Society in 2015 for her work on sentence processing and phoneme recognition. Cutler was elected as Foreign Member of the American Philosophical Society in 2007 and Foreign Associate of the National Academy of Sciences in 2008. In Australia, she was elected as Honorary Fellow of the Australian Academy of the Humanities in 2008 and as Fellow of the Academy of the Social Sciences in Australia in 2009.

In 2000 Cutler was elected member of the Royal Netherlands Academy of Arts and Sciences. Her work has also received the 1999 Spinoza Prize of the Netherlands Organisation for Scientific Research and the International Speech Communication Association Medal. In 2020 she was elected a Fellow of the British Academy (FBA) and she received the Silver Medal in Speech Communication from the Acoustical Society of America (ASA).

== Sources ==
This article incorporates text from a free content work. Licensed under Creative Commons Attribution version 4.0 (license statement/permission). Text taken from Anne Cutler, The Royal Society.
