= Barbara Dosher =

American psychologist

Barbara Anne Dosher
- Education: University of Oregon (M.S., Ph.D.); University of California (B.A.)
- Scientific career
- Fields: Cognitive sciences, Psychology, Perceptual learning
- Workplaces: University of California Irvine

Barbara Dosher is an American scientist and academic specializing in neurology of human memory and attention processes. She is the former dean of the School of Social Sciences and a Distinguished Professor of Cognitive Sciences at University of California, Irvine. She is also the director of the Memory Attention Perception Lab at UC Irvine. Dosher is a member of the National Academy of Sciences. Dosher received the 2018 Atkinson Prize in Psychological and Cognitive Sciences.

== Education and research ==
Barbara Dosher received a B.A. in psychology with a minor in biochemistry from the University of California, San Diego in 1973. She completed her research doctoral training at the University of Oregon in Experimental psychology in 1977. Currently, her primary research interests involve aspects of attentional processes and human memory, particularly forgetting and retrieval of implicit and explicit working memories. She also studies the neural mechanisms of perceptual task learning. Barbara is the co-author of two academic books on vision science: Perceptual Learning: How Experience Shapes Visual Perception and Visual Psychophysics: From Laboratory to Theory.

Dosher is especially known for her work on perceptual learning, the way practice changes how the visual system processes information. Working with Zhong-Lin Lu, she used an “external noise” paradigm in which observers learned to discriminate the orientation of faint patterns embedded in visual noise over many training sessions. Their experiments showed that improvements with practice come from two main mechanisms: better filtering out of external noise and enhanced effective signal strength, rather than simple changes in sensory sensitivity. These findings were formalized in the Perceptual Template Model, which treats learning as a reweighting of connections between early visual channels and decision mechanisms and demonstrates that adult visual processing remains highly plastic.

Later work by Dosher and colleagues extended this approach to show how perceptual learning interacts with selective attention, suggesting that training can reduce the limitations of divided attention across objects in visual tasks.

== Awards and honors ==
- 2018, Atkinson Prize in Psychological and Cognitive Sciences
