= C. Randy Gallistel =

American psychologist (born 1941)

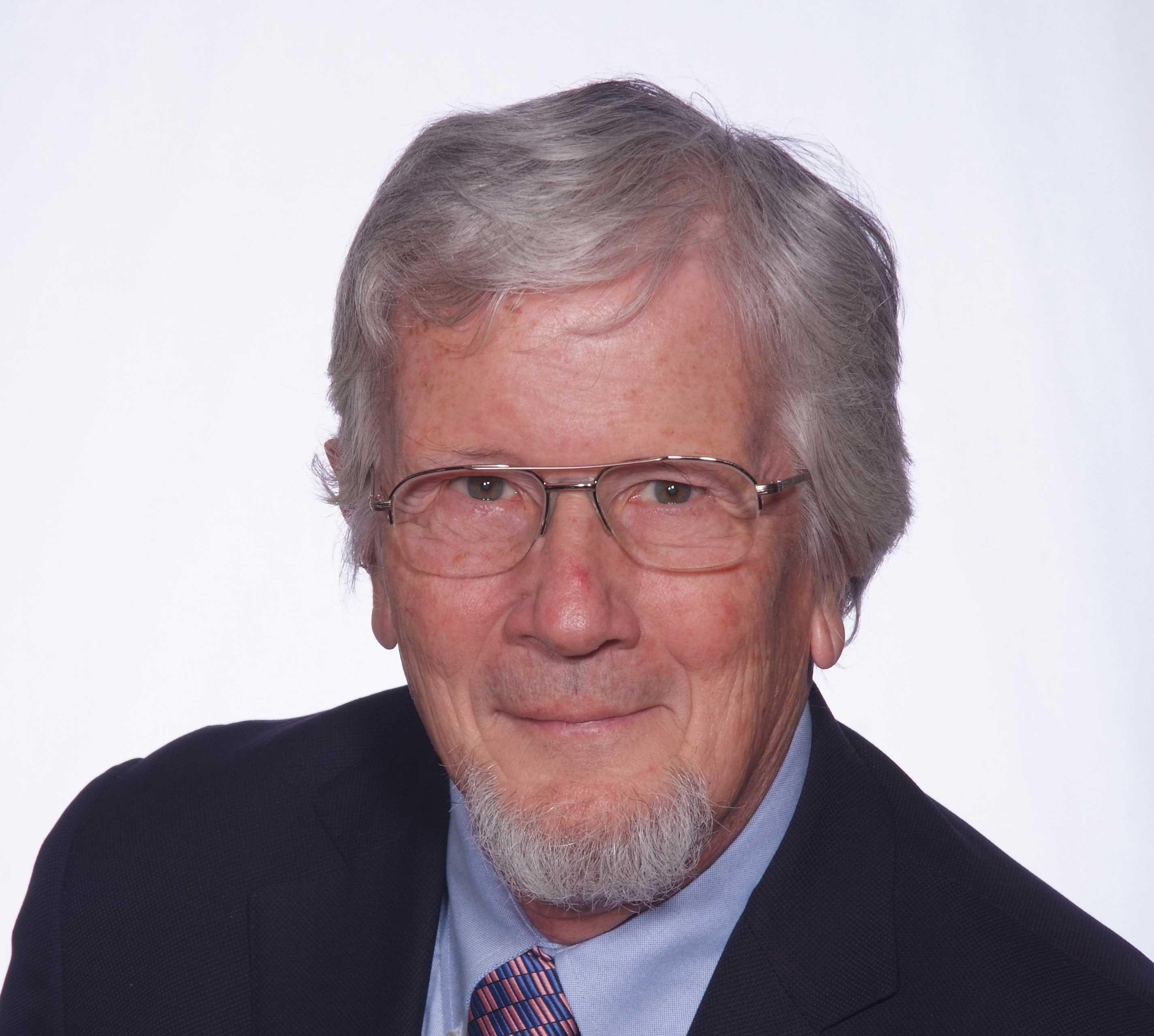
- Born: May 18, 1941 (age 85); Indianapolis, Indiana, U.S.

Academic background
- Education: Stanford University; Yale University
- Thesis: The independent Motivating Effect in intracranial Self-Stimulation (1966)
- Doctoral advisor: Frederick P. Gault

Academic work
- Institutions: University of Pennsylvania; UCLA; Rutgers University

Charles Ransom "Randy" Gallistel (born May 18, 1941) is an Emeritus Professor of Psychology at Rutgers University. He is an expert in the cognitive processes of learning and memory, using animal models to carry out research on these topics. Gallistel is married to fellow psychologist Rochel Gelman. Prior to joining the Rutgers faculty, he held positions at the University of Pennsylvania, where he was chair of the psychology department and Bernard L. & Ida E. Grossman Term Professor, and at the University of California, Los Angeles.

== Academic career ==
Gallistel obtained his BA in psychology from Stanford University in 1963 and his PhD in physiological psychology from Yale University in 1966. He joined the faculty of Psychology at the University of Pennsylvania in 1966, where he became full professor in 1976. He moved to UCLA with his wife, Rochel Gelman, in 1989. They moved to Rutgers University, the State University of New Jersey in New Brunswick, NJ in 2000, where they became co-directors of the Rutgers Center for Cognitive Science. Gallistel was elected to the American Academy of Arts and Sciences in 2001 and to the National Academy of Sciences (USA) in 2002.

== Research ==
Gallistel has made experimental and theoretical contributions to several areas of behavioral and cognitive neuroscience: 1) The nature and development of the representation of numerosity in young children, in collaboration with his wife, Rochel Gelman. 2) The psychophysical analysis of the neural substrate for electrical self-stimulation of the brain. 3) The theory of action and its close relation to the theory of motivation. 4) The theory of learning. 5) What it means to say that brains represent the experienced world. 6) The brain's representation of the abstract variables central to conceptions of space (distance & direction), time (duration and phase), numerosity, rate (number/duration) and probability (subset numerosity/set numerosity). 7) The nature of the engram, the physical realization of memory in brains.

Gallistel is an advocate of the computational theory of mind, and as such he criticized the view of memory as an alteration of synaptic connections (a view that is related to Associationism). His critique, in particular, focuses on how the Associationist theory of mind allegedly cannot explain how the brain encodes quantitative data such as distances, directions, and temporal durations. Gallistel rather argues that such memories could be collected inside the neurons, at the molecular level, and to support his claim he remarks the considerable capacity of polynucleotides for storing information.

== Books ==
- Gallistel, C. R.; King, Adam Philip (2009). Memory and the computational brain: why cognitive science will transform neuroscience. Wiley-Blackwell. ISBN 9781444310498.
- Gallistel, C. R. (1990). The organization of learning. MIT Press. ISBN 0262071134.
- Gelman, Rochel; Gallistel, C. R. (1978). The child’s understanding of number. Harvard University Press. ISBN 0674116364.
- Gallistel, C. R.; Gibbon, John (2002). The symbolic foundations of conditioned behavior. Lawrence Erlbaum Associates. ISBN 0805829342.
- Gallistel, C. R. (1980). The organization of action: A new synthesis. Lawrence Erlbaum Associates. ISBN 0262071134.
