= Rochel Gelman =

Canadian psychologist (born 1942)

Rochel Gelman (born January 23, 1942) is an emeritus psychology professor at Rutgers University, New Brunswick, NJ, and Co-Director of the Center for Cognitive Science. Gelman is married to fellow psychologist C. Randy Gallistel. Prior to joining the Rutgers faculty she taught at the University of California, Los Angeles.

== Awards and honors ==
Dr. Gelman is a member of the National Academy of Sciences, winner of the 1995 Distinguished Scientific Contribution Award from the American Psychological Association (APA), a Fellow of the American Academy of Arts and Sciences, the Cognitive Science Society, and a William James Fellow of the American Psychological Society. She also serves as a member of the Scientific Advisory Board for the False Memory Syndrome Foundation (FMSF).

Dr. Gelman was featured on Closer to the Truth: Science, Meaning and the Future, a PBS series created, produced, and hosted by Dr. Robert Lawrence Kuhn.
