= Dorret Boomsma =

Dutch psychologist

Dorret I. Boomsma
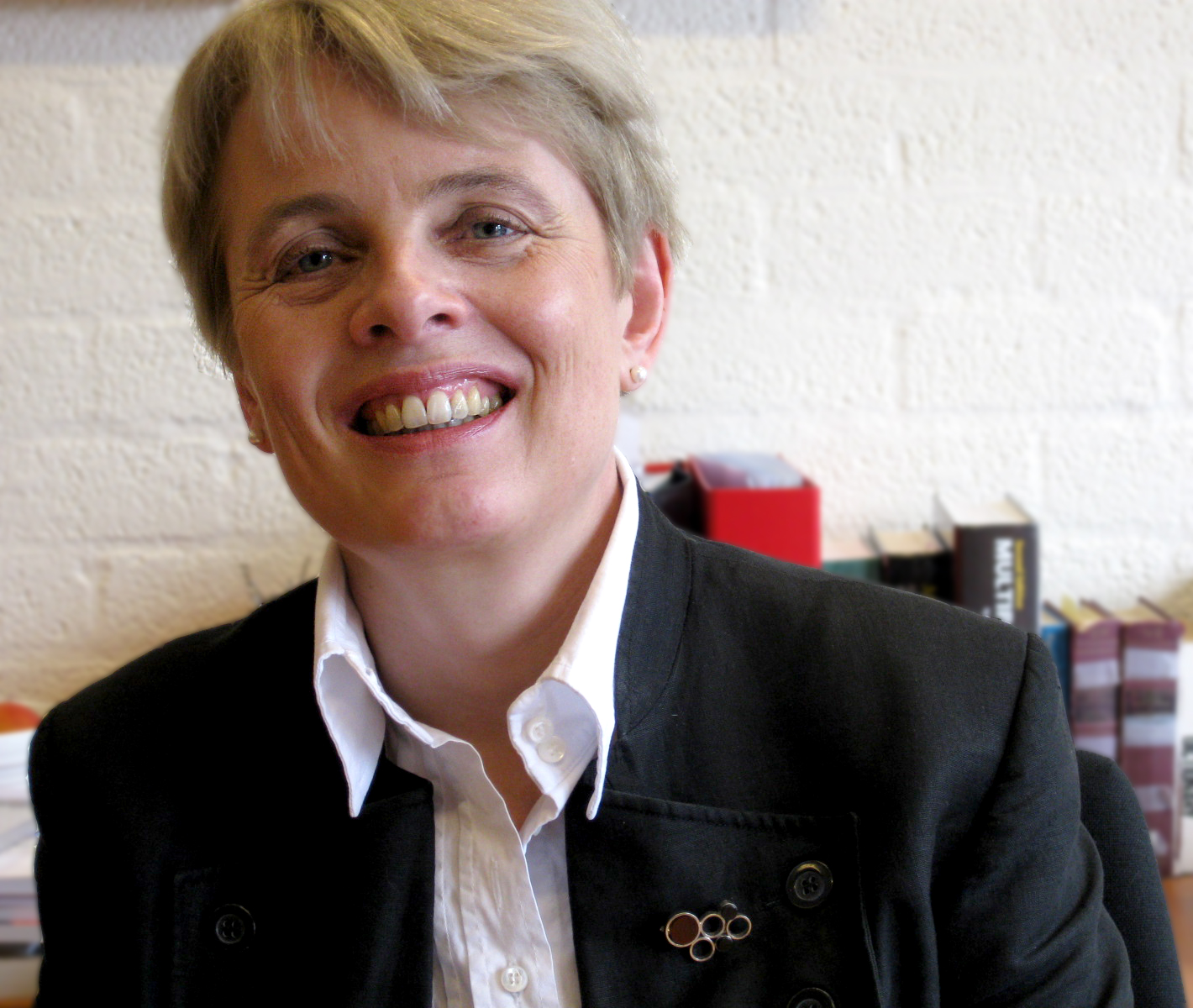
- Born: 18 November 1957 (age 68); Huizen, The Netherlands
- Education: Vrije Universiteit, University of Colorado at Boulder
- Known for: Netherlands Twin Register
- Awards: Spinoza Prize (2001), Membership in the Royal Netherlands Academy of Arts and Sciences (KNAW) (2001)
- Scientific career
- Fields: Behavioural genetics Biological psychology
- Workplaces: Vrije Universiteit

Dorret I. Boomsma (born 18 November 1957, in Huizen, The Netherlands) is a Dutch biological psychologist specializing in genetics and twin studies.

== Education ==
- Secondary education: Willem de Zwijgerlyceum, Bussum
- Bachelor's: Vrije Universiteit in Psychology, cum laude, 1979
- Master's: Vrije Universiteit in Psychophysiology, cum laude, 1983
- Master's: University of Colorado at Boulder in Biological Psychology/Behavior Genetics, 1983
- Ph.D.: Vrije Universiteit (thesis: Quantitative Genetics of Cardiovascular Risk), cum laude, 1992

== Career ==
After receiving her Ph.D., Boomsma received an appointment as an assistant professor at the Vrije Universiteit in the Department of Psychonomics. In 1994 she became associate and in 1998 full professor and head of the Department of Biological Psychology.

== Twin studies ==
Boomsma has built a database of over 75,000 twins and family members in The Netherlands, which has been used for dozens of twin studies. The twins and their families have undergone periodic testing over a period of decades, providing a mass of longitudinal data for statistical analysis. A large number of participants have also provided DNA, blood, and urine samples for testing. Her research has primarily focused on better understanding the influence of heredity on various physical and mental diseases, including cardiovascular diseases, pediatric bipolar disorder, and depression. This work has been reported in over 1000 published papers and one book and has led to many awards for Boomsma.

== Research ==
Twin studies provide a way to understand how genotype affects an observable characteristic (called a phenotype). In short, identical (monozygotic) twins carry the same alleles for 100% of their genes whereas fraternal (dizygotic) twins will carry different alleles at 50% of the genes for which their parents had different genotypes. So if some characteristic (say, depression) that is observed in one identical twin is always observed in the other one, but this does not hold for fraternal twins, then one can conclude that heredity plays an important role in causing the condition.

Boomsma has been a pioneer in collecting a broad spectrum of data (e.g., medical histories, IQ tests, MRI scans) and biological material (e.g., DNA and RNA samples, blood and urine samples) from thousands of twins and analyzing them to determine the role of genetics in characteristics as varied as adult height, brain volume, intelligence, migraine headaches, anxiety, drug addiction, and love of coffee.

Her results span a wide range of behavioral characteristics, including discovery of the surprisingly large genetic component to feelings of loneliness, the fact that first borns have higher IQs than their younger siblings, and the increased influence of genetics on body weight as children grow older.

== European Research Council Advanced Grant ==
In 2008, the European Research Council began awarding grants of about 2.5 million euro (about $3.5 million) to the top scientists and scholars in Europe via a competition that covered all academic disciplines. Due to the large amount of money and complete lack of bureaucracy and restrictions, these were extremely competitive, with a very strong applicant pool and a 13% acceptance rate. Boomsma received one of the ERC grants for a project on the genetics of mental illness. Her research is focusing on three themes:

- Neuropsychiatric disorders (ADHD, anxiety, depression) and cognition
- Depression, anxiety, substance use, abuse, and dependence
- Depression, migraine, obesity, and cardiovascular disease

The goal of this research is to use her twin database and biological specimens to try to determine which genes play a role in causing these conditions.

== Awards ==
Boomsma has received several awards for her research. These include:

- Thompson Award, Behavior Genetics Association (1985)
- Junior-Heymans Award, Dutch Psychological Association (1996)
- Membership in the Royal Netherlands Academy of Arts and Sciences (Koninklijke Nederlandse Akademie van Wetenschappen, KNAW) (2001)
- Membership in the Royal Holland Society of Sciences and Humanities (Koninklijke Hollandsche Maatschappij der Wetenschappen) (2001)
- Spinozapremie (NWO) (2001)
- James Shields Award, International Society for Twin Studies (2002)
- Dr Hendrik Muller Prize for Behavioural and Social Sciences (2009)
- KNAW Merian Prize (2011)
- Elected member of Academia Europaea (2012)
- Dobzhansky Award (2013)
- KNAW Academy Professor Prize (2014)
- Honorary doctorate University of Helsinki Medical School (2022), Finland
- Ming Tsuang Lifetime Achievement Award (2022) from the International Society of Psychiatric Genetics
