= Donders Centre for Cognition =

Dutch research institute

The Donders Centre for Cognition (former Nijmegen Institute for Cognition and Information) is a research institute for cognitive science, neuroscience and information technology. It was founded in 1986 as an integral part of the Faculty of Social Sciences at the Radboud University Nijmegen in The Netherlands.

The DCC maintains strong ties with the nearby Donders Centre for Cognitive Neuroimaging (former F.C. Donders Centre for Cognitive Neuroimaging) in, among other collaborations, a highly-interdisciplinary research master in cognitive neuroscience.
