= Willem Levelt =

Dutch psycholinguist

Willem Johannes Maria Levelt
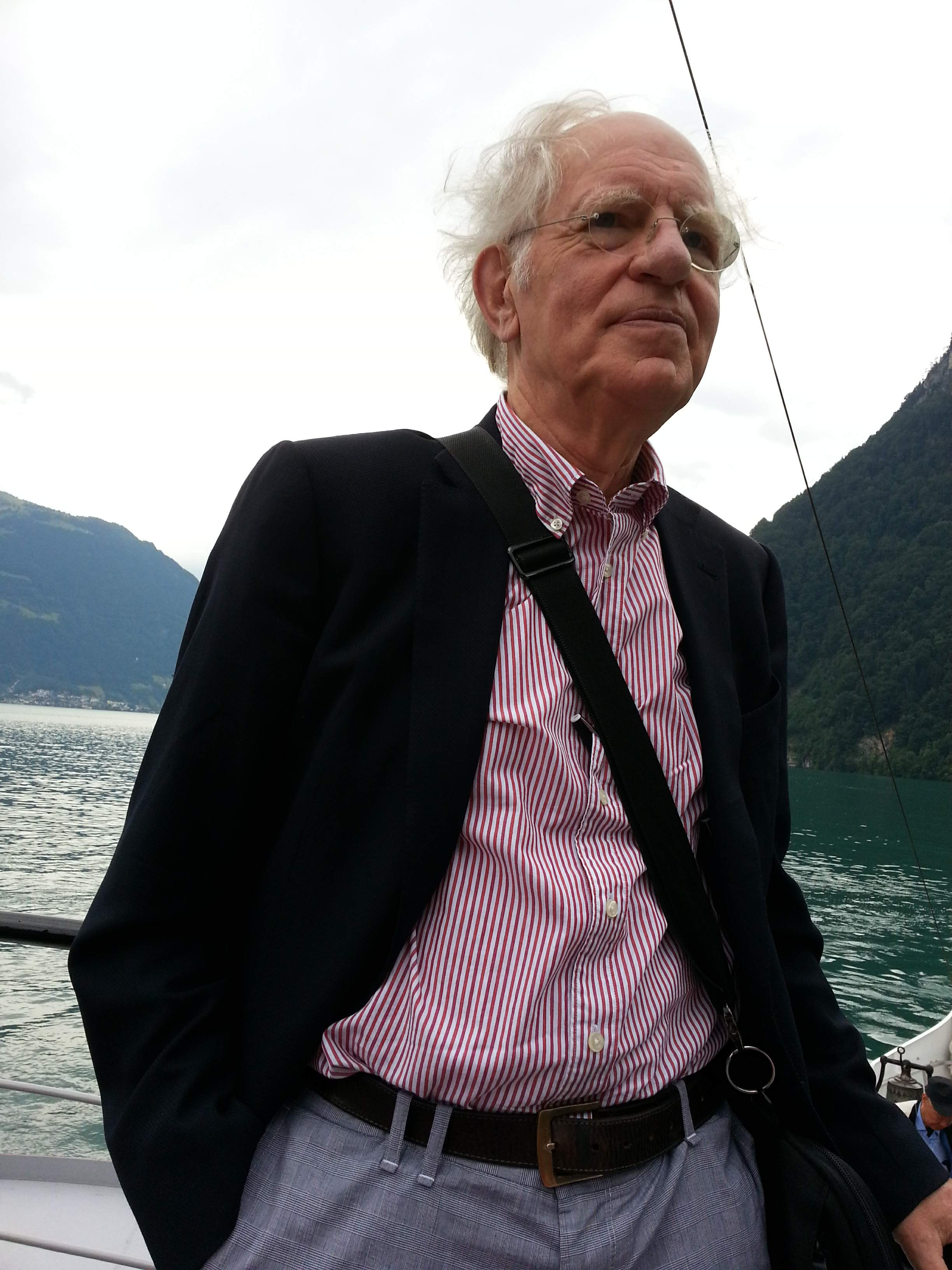
- Levelt in October 2014
- Born: 17 May 1938 (age 88); Amsterdam
- Education: Universiteit Leiden
- Spouse(s): Elisabeth, C.M. Jacobs
- Children: Claartje, Philip, Christiaan
- Scientific career
- Fields: Psycholinguistics
- Institutions: Nijmegen
- Thesis: On Binocular Rivalry (1965)
- Doctoral advisor: Johannes Petrus van de Geer
- Doctoral students: Peter Hagoort
- Website: http://www.mpi.nl/people/levelt-pim

Willem Johannes Maria (Pim) Levelt (born 17 May 1938) is a Dutch psycholinguist. He is a researcher of human language acquisition and speech production. He developed a comprehensive theory of the cognitive processes involved in the act of speaking, including the significance of the "mental lexicon". Levelt was the founding director of the Max Planck Institute for Psycholinguistics in Nijmegen. He also served as president of the Royal Netherlands Academy of Arts and Sciences between 2002 and 2005, of which he has been a member since 1978.

== Education and career ==
Levelt studied psychology at Leiden University. He worked experimentally for five months under Albert Michotte at the University of Louvain. In 1965, he received his doctorate (cum laude) with John P. van de Geer with a thesis on binocular rivalry. He then spent a year as a postdoctoral fellow at the Harvard Center for Cognitive Studies.

Since 1966, Levelt taught and researched at the University of Illinois, the University of Groningen and the Radboud University Nijmegen. In 1968, he became director of the Institute for General Psychology at the University of Groningen and in the following year, he received a full professorship for Experimental Psychology and Psycholinguistics.

From 1971 to 1972, Levelt remained a member of the Institute for Advanced Study Princeton, New Jersey. There he wrote his work Formal grammars in linguistics and psycholinguistics, first published in 1974. Then he received a professorship in Experimental Psychology at the Radboud University Nijmegen.

From 1976, Levelt headed the newly founded project group for psycholinguistics at the Max Planck Society in Nijmegen. In 1980, he received a professorship for psycholinguistics there and became founding director of the Max Planck Institute for Psycholinguistics in Nijmegen. From 2002 to 2005, he was President of the Koninklijke Nederlandse Akademie van Wetenschappen.

In June 2006, Levelt retired. During his career, he has supervised 58 dissertations.

== Speech production as a research focus ==
Language processing is about cognitive processes of language production and language reception. In psycholinguistics, Levelt is best known for his model of language production. Speaking is one of the most complex psychomotor functions of humans. For Levelt, the aim of an utterance lies in the realization of communicative intentions. These communicative intentions are a subset of all the speaker's intentions in a given situation. The processes of speech production are largely automatic and take place in a matter of milliseconds. There are now two alternative basic concepts for the language production process; namely, in addition to the modular-serial approach represented by Levelt, an interactive-connectionist approach as a counter-position. In Levelt's modular model, it is assumed that the processes of each processing stage must be completed before the next processes can be started. In an analogy to computer language, Levelt distinguishes between memory and process components. Two memory modules accommodate the so-called mental lexicon. One memory module accommodates the only vaguely described lemmata, the other the world and situational knowledge.

== Personal ==
In June 1963, Levelt married the musician Elisabeth Jacobs, with whom he had three children.

== Affiliations and honors ==
- Member of the Royal Netherlands Academy of Sciences
- Member of the Holland Society of Sciences
- Member of the Academia Europaea (since 1989)
- Member of the German Academy of Natural Scientists Leopoldina (since 1993)
- Member of the Royal Flemish Academy of Belgium for Sciences and the Arts
- Member of the Bavarian Academy of Sciences
- Corresponding member (living abroad) of the Austrian Academy of Sciences (since 2002)
- Member of the National Academy of Sciences (since 2000)
- Member of the American Philosophical Society (since 2004)
- Honorary member of the De Jonge Academy
- Member of the Cognitive Science Society
- Honorary doctorate from Maastricht University (2000)
- Honorary doctorate from the University of Antwerp (2003)
- Honorary doctorate from the University of Padua (2004)
- Honorary doctorate from the Katholieke Universiteit Leuven (2005)
- Radboud Stichting Prize (1968)
- Hendrik Muller Prize of the Royal Netherlands Academy of Sciences (1993)
- Dutch Psychology Association (NIP) Heymans Prize (1996)
- Knight in the Order of the Netherlands Lion (1998)
- Silver Medal from Radboud University Nijmegen (2004)
- Medal of Honor of the Netherlands Psychonomic Society (2006)
- Foreign member of the Orden Pour le Mérite für Wissenschaften und Künste (2010) (Note: Levelt received the Orden Pour le Mérite für Wissenschaften und Künste in person from the President of Germany on 30 May 2011.)
- Federal Cross of Merit with Star (2012)

== Publications ==
- A History of Psycholinguistics: The Pre-Chomskyan Era (PDF). Oxford: Oxford University Press. 2013.
- Formal Grammars in Linguistics and Psycholinguistics. Amsterdam: John Benjamins Publishing Company. 2008.
  - Volume 1: An Introduction to the Theory of Formal Languages and Automata
  - Volume 2: Applications in Linguistic Theory
  - Volume 3: Psycholinguistic Applications
- Lexical access in speech production. Cambridge, MA: Blackwell. 1993.
- Speaking: from intention to articulation. Cambridge, MA: MIT Press. 1989.
- Child language research in ESF countries: an inventory. Strasbourg: European Science Foundation. 1981.
- An introduction to the theory of formal languages and automata (PDF). Formal grammars in linguistics and psycholinguistics. Vol. 1. The Hague: Mouton. 1974.
- Applications in linguistic theory (PDF). Formal grammars in linguistics and psycholinguistics. Vol. 2. The Hague: Mouton. 1974.
- Psycholinguistic applications (PDF). Formal grammars in linguistics and psycholinguistics. Vol. 3. The Hague: Mouton. 1974.

== Further reading - About Pim Levelt ==
- Taylor, M. Martin; Taylor, Insup (1990). "Speaking: From Intention to Articulation Willem J.M. Levelt (review)" (PDF). Computational Linguistics. 16 (1): 52–56.
