= Eastern Psychological Association =

- Abbreviation: EPA
- Formation: April 27, 1896; 130 years ago
- Headquarters: Montgomery Village, Maryland
- Region served: Eastern United States
- Fields: Psychology
- President: Jennifer Tickle
- President-Elect: David Kearns
- Past President: Jef Lamoureux
- Executive Officer: Jennifer Thompson
- Affiliations: American Psychological Association
- Website: www.easternpsychological.org
- Formerly called: Section of Anthropology, Psychology, and Philosophy of the New York Academy of Science

The Eastern Psychological Association (abbreviated EPA) is a professional organization for psychologists in the Eastern United States. It holds annual meetings where members present their research findings to colleagues. Established in 1896, it is the oldest regional psychological organization in the United States.

== History ==
The Eastern Psychological Association was founded on April 27, 1896 as the Section of Anthropology, Psychology, and Philosophy of the New York Academy of Science. In 1903, it was renamed as the "New York Branch" of the American Psychological Association (APA), with this name reaffirmed in 1930. It was renamed again to the "Eastern Branch" of the American Psychological Association in 1936, and obtained its current name in 1938.

The group that would eventually become the Eastern Psychological Association was formed when some New York psychologists asked the New York Academy of Sciences to broaden their coverage to include the human sciences. The resulting Section of Anthropology, Psychology, and Philosophy met on the fourth Monday of every other month, starting in 1896. At first the anthropology and psychology papers were mixed, but in 1902 they settled on holding three meetings a year on psychology and three on anthropology. Before 1930, the organization was loosely organized, with no bylaws or constitution. Its only official officer was the Secretary who organized the meeting programming. Its change in identity to the New York Branch of the APA was the result of a 1901 APA bylaw change which allowed the establishment of local branches in response to the complaints Midwesterners had in attending APA meetings.

On February 23, 1903 Edward Thorndike chaired the first official meeting of the New York Branch of the APA. At that first meeting James McKeen Cattell, Franklin Henry Giddings, Livingston Farrand, and Franz Boaz all read papers. Notable papers from other meetings in this period include John B. Watson’s “Psychology as the Behaviorist Views It,” given on the February 24, 1913 meeting—just before the same paper was published in the Psychological Review (no reaction to the paper was recorded). The first woman to present was Naomi Norsworthy, in March 1904. Her presentation, based on her PhD thesis, reported on the mental testing of 150 children in state institutions for the “feeble-minded” and in special classes in New York City schools. Generally the meetings were not organized around a theme, with a few exceptions, such as a 1911 memorial session on William James, who had died the previous year. Presenters were often faculty from Columbia University and New York University and meetings were often held there. Compared to other conferences, the group was friendly to graduate students. For example, a student of James McKeen Cattell presented at the first meeting as the New York Branch and space was made for graduate work to be presented.

The group continued to meet three times a year until 1925, holding regular meetings even though World War I. In the 1920s members of the group grew concerned about the number of non-scientists in their midst. Because the New York Section had not required APA membership or any other membership requirements other than paying dues, a number of non-psychologists and applied psychologists had joined. Out of 150 members only 40 were APA members, the rest were “psychiatrists, educators, ministers, sociologists, graduate students” and likely lay members of the public who practiced psychology using their membership in the group as accreditation. The papers presented had also turned towards more applied, consulting directions, which concerned the more academic members of the group. For example a meeting in 1925 featured presentations by Lillian Moller Gilbreth on “Motion Study and Psychology”, Bess Cunningham on “A Report of Studies of Pre-School Children”, Henry Link on “An Experiment in the Selection of Salesmen”, and Anathon Aall on “The Problem of Animal Mind” (the last with lantern illustrations). Out of these four talks, probably only Aall's would have been considered non-applied and thus "scientific."

In 1930 two of the group’s leaders decided to address this issue and invited 360 psychologists who lived within 100 miles of New York City to a one-day meeting. On April 12, 1930, the invited psychologists, 240 in number met on the Heights campus of New York University and voted to form a scientific organization. They would re-form themselves as the New York Branch of the APA and to ask the APA Council of Directors to affirm its existence. They also appointed an executive committee to draft bylaws and decided henceforth hold a day-long meeting in the spring. This first meeting in 1930, presided over by Honorary President Robert S. Woodworth, is what the EPA counts as its first meeting and uses to number its meetings.

The bylaws (published 1931) restricted membership to those who were either members or associates of APA who lived within a 100 mile radius of New York City, and who paid dues, set at $1. While non-members were allowed to attend meetings, they had to be sponsored by a member in order to present a paper. Graduate students were still encouraged to participate—they could join the APA as associates. The bylaws established that future programs wouldn’t rule out applied research, but that members needed to present experimental results. These changes resulted in the consulting psychologists withdrawing to their own organization, The New York State Association of Consulting Psychologists.

Under pressure from psychologists who did not live in New York City, future meetings alternated between New York City locations and locations like Princeton and Yale. Eventually the group expanded its geographic catchment to include the eastern part of the US and Canada and renamed itself the Eastern Branch of the APA. Eventually the APA discontinued its branches and instead allowed regional groups to affiliate with the APA. In response, in 1938, the Eastern Branch voted to rename themselves The Eastern Psychological Association.

== Presidents ==
The current president of the Eastern Psychological Association is Jef Lamoureux. Past chairs (NewYork Branch of the American Psychological Association) and presidents of the EPA include:

- Edward Thorndike (1903-1904)
- F. J. E. Woodbridge (1905)
- Robert MacDougall (1906-1907)
- Adolf Meyer (1908-1910)
- Robert S. Woodworth (1911-1912)
- Wendell T. Bush (1913-1914)
- Albert Poffenberger (1915-1918)
- F. Edith Carothers (1919-1920)
- Edith M. Achilles (1921-1922)
- Howard K. Nixon (1923-1925)
- Henry Garrett (1926-1929)
- Robert S. Woodworth (1930)
- Howard C. Warren (1930-1931)
- Margaret Floy Washburn (1931-1932)
- Raymond Dodge (1932-1933)
- James McKeen Cattell (1933-1934)
- Joseph Jastrow (1934-1935)
- Herbert Langfeld (1935-1936)
- Karl Lashley (1937-1938)
- Karl M. Dallenbach (1938-1939)
- Walter Samuel Hunter (1940-1941)
- Gardner Murphy (1941-1942)
- Gordon Allport (1942-1943)
- Edna Frances Heidbreder (1943-1944)
- Henry Garrett (1944-1945)
- Edwin Boring (1945-1946)
- Anne Anastasi (1946-1947)
- J. McVicker Hunt (1947-1948)
- Otto Klineberg (1948-1949)
- Hadley Cantril (1949-1950)
- Carl Hovland (1950-1951)
- Frank A. Beach (1951-1952)
- Neal E. Miller (1952-1953)
- Harold H. Schlosberg (1953-1954)
- B. F. Skinner (1954-1955)
- Fred S. Keller (1956-1957)
- Stuart W. Cook (1957-1958)
- Carl Pfaffmann (1958-1959)
- James J. Gibson (1959-1960)
- Stanley Smith Stevens (1960-1961)
- George A. Miller (1961-1962)
- Richard L. Solomon (1962-1963)
- David McClelland (1964-1965)
- Eliot Stellar (1965-1966)
- James Deese (1966-1967)
- Eleanor J. Gibson (1967-1968)
- Morton Deutsch (1968-1969)
- Joseph V. Brady (1970-1971)
- Roger Brown (1971-1972)
- William N. Schoenfeld (1972-1973)
- Jerome L. Singer (1973-1974)
- Jerome Kagan (1974-1975)
- Lorrin A. Riggs (1975-1976)
- Julian Rotter (1976-1977)
- Julian Hochberg (1977-1978)
- Leon Kamin (1978-1979)
- Robert Perloff (1980-1981)
- Mary Henle (1981-1982)
- Judith Rodin (1982-1983)
- Virginia S. Sexton (1983-1984)
- Nancy S. Anderson (1984-1985)
- Florence Denmark (1985-1986)
- Robert A. Rescorla (1986-1987)
- Ethel Tobach (1987-1988)
- Edwin P. Hollander (1988-1989)
- Doris R. Aaronson (1989-1990)
- Linda Bartoshuk (1990-1991)
- Russell Church (1991-1992)
- Lewis P. Lipsitt (1992-1993)
- Norman E. Spear (1993-1994)
- Kay Deaux (1994-1995)
- George H. Collier (1995-1996)
- Ludy T. Benjamin (1996-1997)
- Bartley G. Hoebel (1997-1998)
- John Gibbon (1998-1999)
- Ralph R. Miller (1999-2000)
- Barbara Nodine (2000-2001)
- Jeremy M. Wolfe (2001-2002)
- Carolyn Rovee-Collier (2002-2003)
- Peter Balsam (2003-2004)
- Mark Bouton (2004-2005)
- Stanley Weiss (2005-2006)
- Phillip Hineline (2006-2007)
- Robert J. Sternberg (2007-2008)
- Nora Newcombe (2008-2009)
- Kurt Salzinger (2009-2010)
- Ruth Colwill (2010-2011)
- Andrew Delamater (2011-2012)
- Debra A. Zellner (2012-2013)
- Thomas Zentall (2013-2014)
- Susan A. Nolan (2014-2015)
- Terry Davidson (2015-2016)
- Fred Bonato (2016-2017)
- Susan Krauss Whitbourne (2017-2018)
- Dana S. Dunn (2018–2019)
- Amy Learmonth (2019-2020)
- Bernard Beins (2020-2021)
- Bonnie Green (2021-2022)
- Roseanne Flores (2022-2023)
- Amy Silvestri Hunter (2023-2024)
- Patricia J. Brooks (2024-2025)
- Jef Lamoureux (2025-2026)
- Jennifer Tickle (2026-2027)
