= Gibsonian ecological theory of development =

Child development theory

The Gibsonian ecological theory of development is a theory of development that was created by American psychologist Eleanor J. Gibson during the 1960s and 1970s. Gibson emphasized the importance of environment and context in learning and, together with husband and fellow psychologist James J. Gibson, argued that perception was crucial as it allowed humans to adapt to their environments. Gibson stated that "children learn to detect information that specifies objects, events, and layouts in the world that they can use for their daily activities". Thus, humans learn out of necessity. Children are information "hunter–gatherers", gathering information in order to survive and navigate in the world.

== Key concepts ==
Gibson asserted that development was driven by a complex interaction between environmental affordances and the motivated humans who perceive them. For example, to an infant, different surfaces "afford" opportunities for walking, crawling, grasping, etc. As children gain motor skills, they discover new opportunities for movement and thus new affordances. The more chances they are given to perceive and interact with their environment, the more affordances they discover, and the more accurate their perceptions become.

Gibson identified four important aspects of human behavior that develop:

- Agency—Self-control, intentionality in behavior
  - Agency is learning to control both one's own activity and external events
  - Babies learn at an early age that their actions have an effect on the environment
  - For example: Babies were observed kicking their legs at a mobile hanging above them. They had discovered their kicking made the mobile move.
- Prospectivity—Intentional, anticipatory, planful, future-oriented behaviors
  - For example: A baby will reach out to try and catch an object moving toward them because the baby can anticipate that the object will continue to move close enough to catch. In other words, the baby perceives that reaching out his/her hand will afford him/her to catch the object.
- Search for Order—Tendency to see order, regularity, and pattern to make sense of the world
  - For example: Before 9 months, infants begin to recognize the strong-weak stress patterns in their native language
- Flexibility—Perception can adjust to new situations and bodily conditions (such as growth, improved motor skills, or a sprained ankle)
  - Examples: Three-month-old infants lying under a mobile had a string attached to their right leg and then to the mobile so that when they moved their leg the mobile would move. When the string was switched to the left legs, the infants would easily shift to moving that leg to activate the mobile.
  - Perception is an ongoing, active process.

== Methodology ==
Gibson used experimental procedures while also attempting to retain ecological validity by simulating important features of the child's natural environment. In keeping with the idea of affordances, Gibson tried to provide multimodal stimulation for infants in these experiments (multiple kinds of objects, faces, or surfaces, for example) and ways of obtaining feedback through movement and exploration.

One of Gibson's well-known perceptual experiments involved the construction of a "visual cliff," simulating a real cliff. Gibson and Walk placed infants near the cliff and placed mothers on the other side of the cliff. They found that infants perceived depth and were unwilling to crawl over the cliff at approximately 6–7 months. Later experiments showed that 12-month-old infants had learned to use their mothers' facial expressions as signals of potential affordances. If mothers smiled, infants were more likely to crawl over the "dangerous" cliff, but if mothers made a frightened face, infants avoided the cliff.

== Criticism ==
Gibson's theory has been criticized for its "unclear account of cognition". Gibson's theory pertains to direct perception and does not take into account that behaviors may involve indirect, interpretive cognition. Gibson's methodology involves an expensive and complicated experimental set up, which may prove cost- and time-prohibitive for many researchers. Finally, Gibson's research was almost exclusively confined to infants and very young children, so it is difficult to make generalizations throughout the lifespan.

== Current State of Gibsonian Theory ==
Aside from her own writings, Gibson's work is rarely described as a theory of development. When Gibson's primary area of research, affordances, is referenced, the citations typically refer only to James Gibson. Gibson is credited with popularising affordances in perceptual research. However, unlike Gibson, researchers have studied affordances in all age groups, including adults. Affordances have been applied to a range of innovative topics, from automobile driving to text messaging. However, the concept of affordances is usually used in isolation rather than being integrated into Gibson's ecological framework. Some researchers are even attempting to create their own theories of affordances instead of revising Gibson's theory to accommodate new findings.

In addition to areas such as driving, texting, or interface design, the 21st century has also witnessed the strong rise of affordance theory in education, especially language education. Many scholars have attempted to redefine the concept of affordance in the spirit of Gibson's original ecology, emphasising the correlation between the subject and the environment instead of viewing affordance as an object property. In this stream, Quang N. Nguyen is one of the scholars strongly promoting the ecological resurgence of affordance theory in education. His works, such as Affordance Theory in Language Education: A Multidimensional Paradigm (2025) and Beyond Comprehensible Input: A Neuro-ecological Critique of Krashen's Hypothesis in Language Education, have reinterpreted affordance not only as a potential for action but also as a dynamic field where cognition, values, and norms interact. Nguyen develops a “multidimensional” framework consisting of the axes Perceptibility, Valence, Compositionality, Normativity, and Intentionality, thereby extending the scope of affordance theory to the domain of learning, assessment, and self-regulation of language learning. In this way, instead of using affordance simply as a metaphor for “learning opportunity,” or "platform functionalities", Quang N. Nguyen re-establishes affordance as an organising principle of the entire educational ecosystem, a principle in which knowledge is not transmitted.
