= Mary Henle =

American university teacher and psychologist (1913–2007)

- Born: July 14, 1913; Cleveland, Ohio
- Died: November 17, 2007 (aged 94); Haverford, Pennsylvania
- Occupations: Gestalt Psychologist, Professor
- Known for: Contributions to Gestalt Psychology & involvement in the American Psychological Associations (APA)
- Notable work: Helped develop the first laboratory manual in 1948

Mary Henle (July 14, 1913 – November 17, 2007) was an American psychologist who has been known most notably for her contributions to Gestalt psychology and for her involvement in the American Psychological Association. She was involved in the writing or editing several books, including the first psychology laboratory manual, which was published in 1948 and based on the work of Kurt Lewin. Henle was a professor at the New School of Social Research in New York.

== Schooling and life ==
Mary Henle was born to a Jewish family on July 14, 1913, in Cleveland, Ohio. Her family emphasized education. Mary Henle's mother Pearl Hahn Henle was a physician. Pearl's father, without being asked, enrolled Pearl into the study of medicine where she became one of the best physicians of the time. Henle's father Leo immigrated from Stuttgart, Germany to the United States in 1880 at the age of 15. Leo Henle moved to the United States for economic reasons and to pursue his dream of becoming a scientist. Unable to become a scientist, he became a businessman although he continued his education. Growing up in a stimulating home environment encouraged Henle and her siblings to achieve academically. Her brother Paul became a professor of philosophy and her sister Jane studied archeology. Henle entered Smith College in 1930, earning a bachelor's degree in 1934. She earned a bachelor's degree in French and a master's degree, in 1935, in psychology. While pursuing her master's degree, Henle met with James J. Gibson, Eleanor J. Gibson and Kurt Koffka, all renowned in psychology. Henle's encounter with Koffka aroused her interest in Gestalt psychology, motivating her to want to know more about the subject. Henle went on to earn a Ph.D. at Bryn Mawr College. The college hired her as an assistant for Harry Helson. Under Helson she developed a solid understanding of experimental methods. Henle then met Donald W. MacKinnon (who had studied Gestalt psychology in Berlin), which led to her meeting Kurt Lewin. Lewin introduced her to the experimental methods he used in his research in social psychology.

After Henle completed her doctorate in 1939, she obtain a position as research assistant at Swarthmore College, working for Robert B. MacLeod. At Swarthmore, she met Wolfgang Köhler. MacLeod, who had studied in Berlin, invited Köhler to Swarthmore. Kohler taught at Swarthmore until 1955. Henle attended Köhler's seminars and was involved in experimental research with him. A close intellectual relationship with Köhler developed and lasted until his death in 1967. In 1941 Henle obtained an academic position at the University of Delaware. She worked at that university for one year, until the mobilization for the Second World War opened many more positions for psychologists.

In 1942 Harry Helson asked Henle to return to Bryn Mawr, where she first taught psychology to graduate students. After two years of teaching, Henle was appointed to the psychological institute of Sarah Lawrence College (1944–1946). In 1946 Solomon Asch invited Henle, on Köhler's recommendation, to become a professor at the New School for Social Research in New York. She remained there for the rest of her career (1946–1983). At the New School, she published empirical research and advanced Gestalt psychology.

In an autobiographical retrospective Henle paid tribute to the many positive, supportive circumstances and assistantships that she had received that helped to advance her scientific career. But she had not forgotten the difficulties that she faced as a woman and as a Jew in the academic world of the United States, especially in the 1930s.

== Works ==
Henle's initial empirical research concerned (along with that of Koffka) perception. Later, she conducted research on motivation. In the tradition of Kurt Lewin, she also studied the psychology of thinking and the possibilities of a phenomenological approach of personality psychology, including questions of rationality and of the relationship between thinking and logic. In 1948, Henle coauthored a handbook with D.W. MacKinnon based on experimental research on psychodynamics. Later Henle turned to intensively researching the history of ideas in psychology.

Henle strove to make clear the Gestalt theory associated with the Berlin school (Wertheimer, Köhler, Koffka, and others), underlining the school's ideas to psychologists in the United States. She was known for her defense of their views and for challenging misleading interpretations.

In 1961, Henle published the anthology Documents of Gestalt Psychology, which followed up on the 1950 third edition of the original 1938 A Source Book of Gestalt Psychology. Her Documents anthology included papers by Max Wertheimer (on ethics and democracy and freedom), Wolfgang Köhler (evolution and psychology), Rudolf Arnheim (the psychology of expression), Hans Wallach (perception and cognition), Solomon E. Asch (metaphor), and Henle herself (motivation and cognition), among others.

In 1971, Henle and Solomon Asch published the anthology The Selected Papers of Wolfgang Köhler. The anthology pulled together previously scattered essays Köhler had written about the epistemological, psychophysical, and cognitive ideas associated with Gestalt theory.

In 1986, Henle published 1879 and All That: Essays in the Theory and History of Psychology. The date 1879 in the title refers to the year Wilhelm Wundt established the first experimental psychology laboratory although the book traces psychology back to Aristotle. She covers psychology in general; the book, however, lays particular emphasis on Gestalt psychology. Henle also criticizes Gestalt psychotherapy, writing that the equating of Gestalt psychology and Gestalt psychotherapy is a mistake.

In the field of psychotherapy theory one of her papers, Gestalt Psychology and Gestalt Therapy (1975), dealt in depth with the late work of Fritz Perls, founder of Gestalt therapy. Henle criticized in this essay (the essay was a version of a lecture delivered at the annual meeting of the American Psychological Association) the practice of equating Gestalt psychology and Gestalt therapy, a practice common in the US. Henle's essay was itself criticized by some exponents of Gestalt therapy. They argued that Henle unilaterally referred only to Perls's three recent books and ignored the rest of Gestalt therapy literature, thereby creating a distorted image of Gestalt therapy. Henle, in response to the criticism, noted that she already justified her views on Perls, observing that in the publications by Perls that she cited, Perls had explained his earlier works in retrospect. In addition, she did not pass judgment on the psychotherapeutic treatment method, but came to grips with some meta-theoretical statements of Perls and their relation to Gestalt theory.

In German-speaking countries today people base Gestalt Theoretical Psychotherapy on Henle's work, and in particular her work on the Gestalt psychology of substitution as well as her phenomenological approach to personality theory.

In 1978 Henle published in the American Psychologist an essay/tribute to Wolfgang Köhler. In that piece she underlined his bold stand in Nazi Germany in which he struggled against the persecution of his Jewish colleagues.

Mary Henle was President of Division 26 (History of Psychology, 1971–1972) and President of Division 24 (Theoretical and Philosophical Psychology, 1974–1975) of the American Psychological Association (APA). In 1981-1982 she was President of the Eastern Psychological Association (EPA). In 1983 she was awarded an honorary doctorate of the New School for Social Research.

== Death and legacy ==
Mary Henle died at the age of 94 in Haverford, Pennsylvania in 2007. Henle's legacy includes writing eight books, her presidency of the APA's Division of the History of Psychology (1971–1972), presidency of the APA's division Philosophical Psychology (1974–1795), and as the president of the EPA (1981–1982).
