= Forty Studies That Changed Psychology =

Forty Studies That Changed Psychology: Explorations Into the History of Psychological Research is an academic textbook written by Roger R. Hock that is currently in its eighth edition. The book provides summaries, critiques, and updates on important research that has impacted the field of psychology. The textbook is used in psychology courses at all levels of education and has been translated into six languages. It is used to properly relate the present knowledge of psychology with the original research that led to it. It is a window into the history of psychology for anyone wishing to expand their understanding of the true roots of psychology.

== Format ==
The book contains 40 readings and each corresponds to an important psychology-related publication. Readings are further organized into 10 chapters that correspond to major areas of study in psychology. Individual readings all contain similar sections for each of the 40 studies; they include sections on theoretical propositions behind the study, methods used in the study, results of the study, discussion of the results, subsequent research on the same topic, and recent research that cites the original publication.

== Educational and scholarly use ==
Forty Studies was reviewed by the American Psychological Association after the publication of its second edition in 1995. It has become a well-known textbook in psychology and has received peer-reviewed approval by the Society for the Teaching of Psychology's Project Syllabus for use in both lower-level and upper-level courses. Educators have singled out the book as a source of stories to make the topic of scientific psychology more engaging in the classroom. Although it is a secondary source, Forty Studies is occasionally cited as a primary source. In addition, as of June 6, 2013, Google Scholar estimated that the book had been cited by 113 other sources.

== Content ==
Individual readings in the book include a wide variety of classic studies in psychology such as the following:

- Reading 1: One Brain Or Two? — Gazzaniga's split-brain research illustrating the separate functions of the brain's hemispheres.
- Reading 2: More Experience = Bigger Brain — Mark Rosenzweig research on rats raised in highly stimulating environments compared to rats raised in plain or dull circumstances and the effects on the brain.
- Reading 4: Watch Out For The Visual Cliff! — Eleanore J. Gibson's research on the development of depth perception using a visual cliff.
- Reading 5: Take A Long Look — Robert L. Fantz's research on form perception in infants using the display of different images.
- Reading 6: To Sleep, No Doubt To Dream — William Dement's research on whether a lack of dreaming would prevent humans from functioning normally.
