= Edna Frances Heidbreder =

American philosopher and psychologist

Edna Heidbreder
- Born: May 1, 1890; Quincy, Illinois
- Died: February 19, 1985 (aged 94); Bedford, Massachusetts
- Education: Columbia University (Ph.D., 1924) University of Wisconsin (MA, 1918) Knox College (BA, 1907)
- Known for: Advocate for Women's Education, Philosophy, Psychology
- Notable work: Minnesota Mechanical Ability Tests (1930), Seven Psychologies (1933)
- Board member of: American Psychological Association
- Honours: APA 75th Anniversary Celebration Honor

Edna Frances Heidbreder (May 1, 1890 - February 19, 1985) was an American philosopher and psychologist who explored the study of history, and made contributions toward the field of study in psychometrics, systematic psychology, and concept formation. She expressed interest in cognition and systematic psychology, and the experimentation on personality traits and its characteristics. She also did work testing the normal inferiority complex and studied systemic problems in her later work.

Heidbreder earned a doctorate in psychology, and was the first Knox graduate to do so. She was a high school teacher, an instructor at the University of Minnesota, and later on became a professor at Wellesley College. Some of Heidbreder's long-lasting contributions include her involvement in the Minnesota Mechanical Abilities Test, her dissertation, An Experimental Study of Thinking, and her publication, Seven Psychologies which taught the history and seven systems of psychology.

Heidbreder was an active member of the American Psychological Association (APA), the APA Division of General Psychology, and the National Research Council representing APA. She was an advocate of women’s education and of the destigmatization of stereotypes towards women in psychology.

== Early life ==
Heidbreder was born on May 1, 1890, in Quincy, Illinois. Her parents were raised in Quincy and were German immigrants. Her father, William Henry Heidbreder, and her mother, Mathilda Emelie Meyer, had five children, Bertha, Lousie, Edna, Helen, and Ralph. In 1907, Edna graduated from Quincy High and pursued college in Galesburg, Illinois.

== Education ==
In 1907, Heidbreder attended Knox College, in Galesburg IL, graduating with a Bachelor of Arts in 1911. She noted that all professors, and virtually all staff, at the college were men. In her third year of study, Heidbreder took mandatory courses in psychology and philosophy. She recounted that reading Berkeley, Hume, and Kant led her to be increasingly skeptical of the validity of human knowledge, which kickstarted her interest in psychology. After graduating, she was pulled toward the fields of biology, history, philosophy, and psychology.

Rather than continuing to do graduate work after graduation, Heidbreder became a high school history teacher. She credits this decision to her conservative upbringing where women got married, lived at home, and had very stereotypical occupations such as nurse or secretary. In her free time she was involved in community literacy clubs and indulged in philosophical and psychological writings. During WWI, Heidbreder undertook work related to the war effort.

Several years later, without an obvious incentive, Heibreder began graduate work at the University of Wisconsin. She graduated in 1918 with a Masters in Philosophy, which at the time was blended with psychology. Her favourite course was experimental psychology, and inspired her decision to pursue a PhD in Psychology.

Heidbreder attended Columbia University in New York in 1921 and earned her PhD by 1924. Her dissertation was entitled An Experimental Study of Thinking. At Columbia, she attended lectures by psychologists John B. Watson, William McDougall, and Bertrand Russell. Additionally, she took courses with R.S. Woodworth, H.L. Hollingworth, and John Dewey. Heidbreder recounts that the psychology department at Columbia was “perfectly hospitable but not encouraging to women”. She took this seriously and advocated for women to prosper in education.

== Career ==
After completing her PhD, Heidbreder taught at the University of Minnesota from 1924 to 1934. During her time there, she researched thinking, problem solving, attainment of concepts, introversion versus extroversion, and inferiority attitudes. The chair of the psychology department urged Heidbreder to write a book on history and psychological systems. She agreed and published Seven Psychologies in 1933 which outlined American trends of psychological thinking. At the university, Heidbreder was also asked to help assemble, edit, and put together a draft of reports for The Minnesota Mechanical Ability Tests which were being developed. Her contribution was indispensable, as indicated by R.M. Elliott who said her work was “greater than that of anyone else in the group”.

In 1934, Heidbreder was contacted by Wellesley College who offered her a teaching position. The college was looking for “the most distinguished woman psychologist in the country”. She published several papers in systematic psychology in her time at Wellesley, and remained there until her retirement in 1955. Despite retiring, she taught at Radcliffe College, the women-equivalent of Harvard, for six years.

== Published works ==
=== Thinking as an Instinct (1926) ===
As a psychologist in the field of research, Heidbreder was interested in the notion that the mechanism of thinking could possess identical properties similar to a biological instinct. In 1926, she published a psychological review called Thinking as an Instinct, in which she compared and connected to previous works from John Dewey’s Essays in Logical Theory and How We Think, as well as William James’ The Principles of Psychology to her new functionalist school of thought around the topic of thinking.

Heidbreder stated that the reason the notion of thinking has been disregarded within the field of psychology was because it was brought upon a philosophical manner rather than a testable subject that could be studied within the realm of empirical research. This led her to thoroughly examine the criteria in which thinking could be classified as scientific and nature-based, in relation to the nature-nurture debate. Her psychological review emphasized the ever-changing theories, ideas, and school of thoughts within psychology as she explored its fluidity. A topic that was once solely looked at within a metaphysical point-of-view could essentially be renewed and relooked at with just a change of direction and perception - in this case, a biological point of view. She looked towards science to explain thinking that was once viewed as a philosophical matter.

In her account on the basis of thinking as an instinct, Heidbreder believed that as natural as eating could be for human survival, thinking could be regarded in a similar sense. She thought that both eating and thinking were naturally occurring without the influence of an outer or inner force to do so. Both were mindless activities in which humans engage in and essentially was something that they needed to do but there wasn’t an exact explanation behind it for doing so. She also stated that the mechanisms behind the drive of our thought process could be compared to other biological processes that humans possess; in a sense that it functioned, occurred, and goal-orientated within the same way.

To build on, Heidbreder also broke down the mechanisms of thinking and compared it to the other functions that occur within the human body classified as instincts. She suggested that thinking is similar to an impulse in which there isn’t a reason behind the creation of thoughts but rather thoughts occur spontaneously and out of one’s control. This led her to believe that thinking is based on its native capacity to function. She strayed away from the philosophical thoughts of reasoning to explain occurrences and wanted to examine it within a scientific manner - it wasn't that philosophical explanations were wrong, but more so she was fascinated by her own interests.

Heidbreder also credited from Dewey and James as a reference to their biological perspectives within psychology. She used their ideas explicitly to support and contrast her change in paradigm when looking at the process of thinking. Drawing from James’ idea that the need for thinking has been rooted and innately present within the upbringing of animals, including humans, Heidbreder elaborated on how thinking can relate to a variety of survival reasons. She believed that animals were, by nature, creatures that survive off of their instincts and that humans were a category of animals. She also thought that distinctiveness was key to determining if something was classified as an instinct or not. In accordance to distinctiveness, she believed that one main characteristic of an instinct is whether it provides an importance within an organism and that the behaviour of the instinct functions within a constant pattern. Thinking is one of the important characteristics that define humans and thinking occurs almost homogeneously between humans - thus, thinking is an instinct.

Heidbreder hoped that her analyses would provide a new perspective on viewing the concept of thinking within psychology. She emphasized the fundamental need to start understanding phenomena within a much more diverse manner and within a multi-comparison level in order to grasp the essence of what it is, how it functions, and how it developed, rather than within a singular, structured perspective.

=== Seven Psychologies (1933) ===
Published in 1933, Seven Psychologies was one of Edna Heidbreder's most acclaimed pieces. The book’s target audience were individuals outside of the field of psychology who were fascinated by the main theories and theorists who influenced American psychology. Heidbreder focused on seven theories/schools of thought and their associated theorists: structuralism and Edward Bradford Titchener; the psychology of William James; functionalism and the University of Chicago psychologists (including, Dewey, James Rowland Angell, and Harvey A. Carr); behaviourism and Watson; dynamic psychology and Columbia (including Woodworth); Gestalt psychology; and psychoanalysis and Sigmund Freud.

Heidbreder’s approach was to examine the perspective of each theorist’s viewpoint on psychology through their different schools of thought while discussing the positives and deficiencies of each theory. Heidbreder evaluated the theories based on their ability to progress the scientific approach to psychology rather than on their accuracy. For instance, in regard to Titchener, she discussed how he wanted psychology to be researched through a metaphysical approach while removing intuition-based explanations of the mind—something he viewed as a barrier to advancing the scientific approach to psychology.

Heidbreder acknowledged the limitations of her book, namely that she did not incorporate all of the key influencers at the time, such as Charles Edward Spearman, and that, for the theories she did incorporate, she did not delve into deviations, such as Carl Jung’s influence on psychoanalysis. She also discussed the potential pitfalls of her approach to writing the book, such as the illusion of cohesion within a theory and the oversimplification of concepts. However, in defending her decisions, Heidbreder reiterated that the purpose of the text was for a non-psychologist to gain a brief insight into the main sources of influences on American psychology.

Heidbreder received praise for her objective approach from prominent psychologists. For instance, Kurt Koffka, one of the founders of Gestalt psychology, commented: “Throughout I was struck by the clearness, impartiality and the fairness of your exposition. You have the progress of psychology at heart, and you try to present the different and conflicting systems in such a way that psychology may derive some benefit from your stock-taking."

== Women's right to education ==
Edna Heidbreder strongly advocated for women’s rights, particularly women’s rights in learning and education. She was also aware of the discrimination and inequality women had to continuously face in science and research as it was studied predominantly by men at the time. When learning at school, she found it hard being in the field of science and psychology as she was surrounded by men, including the professors that taught her. She was observant of the school’s tolerance of women within education, and how hospitable they were to them. Heidbreder believed that women eventually came to understand that they live in a society that was more favorable to men. This included fields of study such as psychology, the sciences, and other ambitious disciplines. She believed that while women did acknowledge this reality, it did not mean they supported it; it was simply a conformity that people were expected to follow.

The cause of men being favored in most academic fields, Heidbreder believed, was due to the nature of the conditions outside the workplace and disciplines. She suggested that this was because of stereotypes that people associated with gender within society. These stereotypes affected how the opposite sex see each other and how they interact with each other, accordingly. Women in non-stereotypical positions, working in male-dominant fields of science and research, was difficult to become accustomed to for some, even subconsciously, according to Heidbreder.

== Committees and awards ==
=== Affiliations with the American Psychological Association ===
Edna Heidbreder was involved with the American Psychological Association (APA), and provided services to them for over a decade, until her retirement in 1955. She was an active member of the Board of Directors from 1939 to 1940, and again from 1942 to 1944. In 1944, she was a representative of the APA to the National Research Council until 1947, and she started again from 1952 to 1955. In 1950, she became the president of the Division on General Psychology - now known as the Society for General Psychology. In 1967, Heidbreder was one of thirty-seven senior members honored by the Association as part of its 75th anniversary celebration. Her work on thinking and cognition, and her book Seven Psychologies were specially mentioned.

=== Other affiliations ===
Heidbreder was president of the Eastern Psychological Association (EPA), from 1943 to 1944. Apart from her, only one other woman had been in this position. She remained in the EPA for three years as a member of their Board of Directors.

In 1940, Heidbreder began work as a secretary for the American Association for the Advancement of Science (AAAS). She was a secretary for seven years until she became vice-president in 1947. She also became the chairperson for the AAAS’ section on psychology, and she remained there as the chairperson until 1948.
