= Carl Pfaffmann =

American physiological psychologist

Carl Pfaffmann (May 27, 1913 – April 16, 1994) was an American physiological psychologist, noted for his research of the senses of smell and taste.

Pfaffman was a member of the National Academy of Sciences, the American Academy of Arts and Sciences, the American Philosophical Society, Florence Pirce Grant University Professor of Psychology at Brown University, Vincent and Brooke Astor Professor at Rockefeller University. He was a recipient of the Warren Medal from Society of Experimental Psychologists and the Distinguished Scientific Contribution Award from American Psychological Association. He was also president of the Eastern Psychological Association and the Division of Experimental Psychology of the American Psychological Association.

== Early life ==
Pfaffmann was born in Brooklyn, New York on May 27, 1913 and grew up in nearby Queens. His grandparents emigrated from Germany. He graduated from Brown University in 1933 as one of the youngest members of his class.

== Chronology ==
- 1913 born in Manhattan
- 1933 graduated from Brown University
- 1935 became Rhodes Scholar
- 1939 Ph.D. in physiology, Cambridge University
- 1940–1965 faculty positions Brown University
  - 1952 professor of psychology
  - 1960 Florence Pirce Grant University Professor of Psychology
- 1965 a professor and vice president, Rockefeller University
- 1978 retires
- 1980 named Vincent and Brooke Astor Professor
