= I Make Envy on Your Disco =

2024 novel by Eric Schnall

- Author: Eric Schnall
- Language: English
- Genre: Fiction
- Publisher: University of Nebraska Press
- Publication date: May 1, 2024
- Pages: 296
- ISBN: 978-1-4962-3901-3

I Make Envy on Your Disco is a 2024 debut novel written by Eric Schnall.

== Plot ==
Sam Singer, 37, an art adviser from New York, deals with an early midlife crisis during a visit to Berlin.

== Critical reception ==
Publishers Weekly wrote, "Schnall succeeds at bringing the city’s strange beauty to life. This will strike a chord with anyone who’s been touched by the magic of Berlin."

Paper said "The interweaving of Sam’s discovery of Berlin’s cultural cachet alongside his own self-discoveries makes for a story equal parts attentive, introspective, thrilling and queer."
