= Kevin M. Sullivan =

American author (born c. 1955)

- Born: February 2, 1955 (age 71); Louisville, Kentucky, U.S.
- Occupations: Author; crime writer; biographer
- Writing career
- Genre: Non-fiction
- Subjects: True crime, history
- Notable work: The Bundy Murders: A Comprehensive History

Kevin M. Sullivan (born February 2, 1955) is an American history and true crime author whose works include seven books about serial killer Ted Bundy, along with several other crime books. He lives in Louisville, Kentucky.

== Career ==
A retired minister, Sullivan has written 18 books, seven of which are about serial killer Ted Bundy, including Ted Bundy's Murderous Mysteries: The Many Victims of America's Most Infamous Serial Killer and The Bundy Murders: A Comprehensive History. He also teamed with New York Times bestselling crime author Gregg Olsen to write Unnatural Causes, along with three other co-authored titles with Olsen.

Katherine Ramsland, author of The Human Predator, in 2016 wrote about Sullivan's book The Trail of Ted Bundy in Psychology Today, noting, "Even if you think you already know everything there is to know about Ted Bundy, you’ll probably learn something new from this companion book. If you don’t know much about this poster boy for American serial killers, Sullivan’s renderings offer a solid and chilling portrait." In 2023, Ramsland listed and analyzed, in a Psychology Today article, five myths about Bundy gleaned from Sullivan's book Ted Bundy: The Yearly Journal.

Portions of Sullivan's biography of Bundy are included in the college textbook Abnormal Psychology: Clinical Perspectives on Psychological Disorders, by Susan Krauss Whitbourne and published by McGraw-Hill in November 2012.

He appeared in a 2018 Reelz documentary "Ted Bundy: Serial Monster" TV Series. He also appeared in a TV miniseries "Ted Bundy: The Survivors" in 2020, produced by Michael Hoff Productions. He appeared as well in two more Oxygen network segments in 2018, including "Snapped Notorious: Ted Bundy" an eerie documentary of Bundy's life and the segment "Who Was Ted Bundy? Everything You Need To Know About The Twisted, 'Charming' Serial Killer."

Sullivan appeared in ABC's 20/20 special, "Life with Bundy" in January 2020. The segment was re-released on ABC's Nightline show.

An excerpt published by A&E Networks of Sullivan's book Ted Bundy's Murderous Mysteries in an article titled Ted Bundy, Babysitter covered Bundy's relationships with children when Bundy babysat for them.

About Bundy, the Fort Collins Coloradoan newspaper quoted Sullivan as saying, "He understood that normal people are not thinking about people like him tracking them and hunting them."

He participated as a guest speaker in Duquesne University's 18th annual Forensic Science and Law Symposium in September 2019.

== Bibliography ==
=== Books ===
==== Non-fiction ====
- Shattering the Myth: Signposts on Custer's Road to Disaster (1996, Professional Press) (ISBN 978-1570871955)
- The Bundy Murders: A Comprehensive History, 1st ed. (2009, McFarland) (ISBN 978-0786444267)
- Custer's Road to Disaster: The Path to Little Bighorn, 1st ed. (2013, TwoDot) (ISBN 978-0762784417)
- Death of a Cheerleader (co-authored with Gregg Olsen) (2014, Notorious USA) (ASIN B00KWTVK3U)
- Angel of Death (co-authored with Gregg Olsen) (2014, Notorious USA) (ASIN B00MAVSCLG)
- The Amish Schoolhouse Murders (co-authored with Gregg Olsen) (2014, Notorious USA) (ASIN B00MAZATTA)
- Unnatural Causes: Notorious USA: Kentucky, Pennsylvania & Ohio (co-authored with Gregg Olsen) (2014, CreateSpace) (ISBN 978-1501023491)
- The Trail of Ted Bundy: Digging Up the Untold Stories (2016, Wildblue Press) (ISBN 978-1942266372)
- Kentucky Bloodbath: Ten Bizarre Tales of Murder From The Bluegrass State (2015, Wildblue Press) (ISBN 978-1942266174)
- Vampire: The Richard Chase Murders (2015, Wildblue Press) (ISBN 978-1942266112)
- The Bundy Secrets: Hidden Files on America's Worst Serial Killer (2017, Wildblue Press') (ISBN 978-1942266853)
- Through an Unlocked Door: In Walks Murder (2018, Exposit Books) (ISBN 978-1476668857)
- Ted Bundy's Murderous Mysteries: The Many Victims Of America's Most Infamous Serial Killer (2019, Wildblue Press) (ISBN 978-1948239158)
- THE ENCYCLOPEDIA OF THE TED BUNDY MURDERS (2020, Wildblue Press) (ISBN 978-1948239615)
- The Enigma of Ted Bundy (2020, Wildblue Press) (ISBN 978-1952225383)
- The Bundy Murders: A Comprehensive History, 2nd ed. (2020, McFarland) (ISBN 978-1476681009)
- TED BUNDY: The Yearly Journal (2022, Wildblue Press) (ISBN 978-1957288307)

==== Anthology (contributor) ====
- Dangerous Dozen (2017, Notorious USA) (ISBN 978-1543041002)
