= Louis Matzel =

American psychologist

- Education: American University; George Mason University; Binghamton University
- Known for: Research on intelligence
- Awards: James McKeen Cattell Fund Fellowship from the Association for Psychological Science (1999–2000)
- Scientific career
- Fields: Psychology
- Institutions: Rutgers University
- Thesis: Reexamination of Simultaneous and Backward Conditioning: Implications for Contiguity Theory (1988)

Louis D. Matzel is a professor of psychology at Rutgers University. His research is in the fields of behavioral neuroscience and differential psychology, with a focus on individual differences in intelligence. He is also noted for his criticisms of the concept of long-term potentiation. He was a recipient of the James McKeen Cattell Fund Fellowship from the Association for Psychological Science in 1999–2000, and he has been a fellow of the Eastern Psychological Association since 2009.
