= WPDS =

WPDS may refer to:

- WPDS-LD, a low-power television station in Largo, etc., Florida, United States
- WGHR (FM), a radio station in Spring Hill, Florida, which held the call sign WPDS from January 1990 to August 1992
- WFLZ-FM, a radio station in Tampa, Florida, which held the call sign WPDS from September 1985 to October 1987
- WXIN (TV), a television station in Indianapolis, Indiana, United States, which held the call sign WPDS-TV from July 1983 to August 1985
- Woodworth Personal Data Sheet, a personality test
