= Norsworthy =

Norsworthy is a surname. Notable people with the surname include:

- Barry Norsworthy (1951–2021), Australian rules footballer
- Hubert Henry Norsworthy (1885–1961), English organist and composer
- Naomi Norsworthy (1877–1916), American psychologist
- Ron Norsworthy, American production designer
- Peter Norsworthy, (1961-), Canadian Seafood Industry Consultant
