= Jeremy M. Wolfe =

American cognitive scientist

- Education: Princeton University (A.B.); Massachusetts Institute of Technology (Ph.D.)
- Known for: Visual attention Visual search Medical image perception Guided Search model
- Awards: Elected to American Academy of Arts and Sciences (2019); Fellow of the American Psychological Association; Fellow of the Association for Psychological Science; Fellow of the American Association for the Advancement of Science; Fellow of the Society of Experimental Psychologists
- Scientific career
- Fields: Cognitive science, Visual perception, Cognitive neuroscience
- Workplaces: Harvard Medical School; Brigham and Women's Hospital; Massachusetts Institute of Technology
- Thesis: Global precedence in form perception (1981)
- Doctoral advisor: Richard Held

Jeremy M. Wolfe is an American cognitive scientist known for his research in visual attention, visual search, and medical image perception. He is Professor of Ophthalmology and Radiology at Harvard Medical School, and directs the Visual Attention Lab at Brigham and Women's Hospital in Boston.

== Education ==
Wolfe earned his A.B. degree summa cum laude from Princeton University in 1977. He received his Ph.D. in Psychology from the Massachusetts Institute of Technology (MIT) in 1981, where he studied under Richard Held.

== Career ==
Since 2010, Wolfe has served as a Professor of Radiology at Harvard Medical School and, since 2002, as a Professor of Ophthalmology.

Prior to joining Brigham and Women’s Hospital and Harvard Medical School, Wolfe held faculty positions at MIT from 1981 to 1991, rising to Associate Professor in the Department of Brain and Cognitive Sciences in 1987. From 1991 to 2002, he was Associate Professor of Ophthalmology at Harvard Medical School.

At Brigham and Women’s Hospital, he has served as Psychophysicist since 1991 and Director of the Visual Attention Lab since 2010. He was also Director of Psychophysical Studies in the Center for Clinical Cataract Research and later Director of the Center for Advanced Medical Imaging.

=== Other academic appointments ===
Wolfe has held visiting and adjunct appointments at multiple institutions, including Boston University, Tel Aviv University, the University of Sydney, Brown University, Wellesley College, and MIT.

== Professional service ==
Wolfe has held leadership roles in major professional societies. He served as President of the Federation of Associations in Behavioral & Brain Sciences (FABBS), Chair of the Psychonomic Society, and President of Division 3 of the American Psychological Association. He has also served on the boards of the Vision Sciences Society and the Eastern Psychological Association.

== Research ==
Wolfe's research focuses on visual attention and search processes in human perception. He is particularly known for developing the "Guided Search" model, a theoretical framework that explains how visual search is influenced by both bottom-up (stimulus-driven) and top-down (goal-directed) mechanisms. The most recent version of this model, Guided Search 6.0 (GS6), proposes that a limited number of visual features—such as color or orientation—are used to direct attention efficiently within complex visual environments. The model also accounts for the influence of scene structure, semantic content, and prior search history on attentional guidance.

Guided Search has been applied to practical domains, including airport security screening and diagnostic radiology. In these contexts, Wolfe has examined the "low prevalence effect," a phenomenon where observers are more likely to miss targets that appear infrequently, such as tumors in medical images. One notable study demonstrated that experienced radiologists could overlook an unexpected image—such as a gorilla embedded in a CT scan—highlighting limitations in visual awareness under certain conditions.

Wolfe has also investigated visual memory and tracking. His findings suggest that visual search is generally amnesic, with limited memory for previously attended locations. In contrast, visual tracking may involve partial memory of the positions of more objects than traditionally assumed, challenging established limits on tracking capacity.

== Editorial work ==
Wolfe has served as Editor-in-Chief for Attention, Perception, & Psychophysics and was the founding editor of Cognitive Research: Principles and Implications, both published by the Psychonomic Society. He has served on numerous editorial boards and is currently an Associate Editor for Cognitive Psychology.

== Honors and awards ==
- 2022 – Clifford T. Morgan Distinguished Leadership Award, Psychonomic Society
- 2019 – Elected to the American Academy of Arts and Sciences
- 2009 – Distinguished Scientific Contribution, New England Psychological Association
- Fellow of the American Psychological Association
- Fellow of the Association for Psychological Science
- Fellow of the American Association for the Advancement of Science.
- Fellow of the Society of Experimental Psychologists
