= Keith Rayner =

Keith Rayner may refer to:

- Keith Rayner (bishop) (1929–2025), Australian Anglican bishop
- Keith Rayner (psychologist) (1943–2015), American cognitive psychologist
