= James J. Gibson =

American psychologist (1904–1979)

- Born: James Jerome Gibson; January 27, 1904; McConnelsville, Ohio, U.S.
- Died: December 11, 1979 (aged 75); Ithaca, New York, U.S.
- Education: Northwestern University; Princeton University (BA, PhD)
- Known for: Theory of affordance
- Scientific career
- Fields: Experimental psychology Visual perception
- Institutions: Smith College; Cornell University
- Doctoral advisor: Herbert Langfeld
- Other academic advisors: Edwin Holt

James Jerome Gibson (/ˈɡɪbsən/; January 27, 1904 – December 11, 1979) was an American psychologist and is considered to be one of the most important contributors to the field of visual perception. Gibson challenged the idea that the nervous system actively constructs conscious visual perception, and instead promoted ecological psychology, in which the mind directly perceives environmental stimuli without additional cognitive construction or processing. A Review of General Psychology survey, published in 2002, ranked him as the 88th most cited psychologist of the 20th century, tied with John Garcia, David Rumelhart, Louis Leon Thurstone, Margaret Floy Washburn, and Robert S. Woodworth.

== Biography ==
=== Early life ===
James Jerome Gibson was born in McConnelsville, Ohio, on January 27, 1904, to Thomas and Gertrude Gibson. He was the oldest of three children and had two younger brothers, Thomas and William. Gibson's father worked for Wisconsin Central Railroad, and his mother was a schoolteacher. Because his father worked on the railroad, Gibson and his family had to travel and relocate quite frequently, moving throughout the Dakotas and Wisconsin until they finally settled down in the Chicago suburb of Wilmette.

When Gibson was a boy, his father would take him out on train rides. Gibson recalled being absolutely fascinated by the way the visual world would appear when in motion. In the direction of the train, the visual world would appear to flow in the same direction and expand. When Gibson looked behind the train, the visual world would seem to contract. These experiences sparked Gibson's interest in optic flow and the visual information generated from different modes of transportation. Later in life, Gibson would apply this fascination to the study of visual perception of landing and flying planes.

=== Education and career ===
Gibson began his undergraduate career at Northwestern University, but transferred after his freshman year to Princeton University, where he majored in philosophy. While enrolled at Princeton, Gibson had many influential professors including Edwin B. Holt who advocated new realism, and Herbert S. Langfeld who had taught Gibson's experimental psychology course. After taking Langfeld's course, Gibson decided to stay at Princeton as a graduate student and pursued his PhD in psychology with Langfeld serving as his doctoral adviser. His doctoral dissertation focused on memory of visual forms, and he received his PhD in 1928.

E. B. Holt, who was taught by William James, inspired Gibson to be a radical empiricist. Holt was a mentor to Gibson. While Gibson may not have directly read William James' work, E. B. Holt was the connecting factor between the two. Holt's theory of molar behaviorism brought James's philosophy of radical empiricism into psychology. Heft argues that Gibson's work was an application of William James'. Gibson believed that perception is direct and meaningful. He discussed the meaning of perception through his theory of affordances. Gibson also was influenced by James' neutral monism, which posits that nothing is solely mental or physical.

Gibson started his career at Smith College as a psychology teacher. While at Smith, Gibson encountered two influential figures in his life, one of which was the Gestalt psychologist Kurt Koffka. Although Gibson did not agree with Gestalt psychology, he nevertheless agreed with Koffka's belief that the primary investigations of psychology should be problems related to perception. The other important figure Gibson met during his time at Smith College was his wife, Eleanor Jack, who became a prominent psychologist known for her investigations such as the "visual cliff." The two were married on September 17, 1932, and later had two children, James Jerome Jr. in 1940 and Jean Grier in 1943.

In 1941, Gibson entered the U.S. Army, where he became the director of a unit for the Army Air Forces' Aviation Psychology Program during World War II. Of particular interest to him was the effect flying an aircraft had on visual perception. He used his findings to help develop visual aptitude tests for screening out pilot applicants. He was promoted to the rank of lieutenant colonel in 1946. After the war ended, he returned to Smith College for a short period during which he began writing his first book, The Perception of the Visual World, in which he discussed visual phenomena such as retinal texture gradient and retinal motion gradient. Before the book was published in 1950, Gibson moved to Cornell University where he continued to teach and conduct research for the rest of his life.

=== Honors and awards ===
After publication of his book in 1950, Gibson won the Warren Medal as a member of the Society of Experimental Psychologists in 1952. He also became a division president for the American Psychological Association (APA) and for the Eastern Psychological Association. Among many of Gibson's other honors were receiving the Distinguished Scientific Contribution Award in 1961, becoming a Fulbright fellow at Oxford University, a fellow of the Institute for Advanced Study in Princeton, New Jersey, and a fellow of the Center for Advanced Study in the Behavioral Sciences at Stanford University. Gibson was elected into the National Academy of Sciences in 1967. Gibson received honorary doctorates by Edinburgh and Uppsala Universities.

Gibson died in Ithaca, New York on December 11, 1979. He was 75 years old.

== Major contributions and works ==
=== Gibson's approach to visual perception ===
The question driving Gibson's research on perception was "how do we see the world as we do?". This instigated his empirical research, the environment, and how the individual experiences said environment. There were two primary ways in which Gibson reformed the way psychology views perception. The first is that the templates of our stimulation are affected by a moving organism. This was shown through his research on optic arrays. Secondly, he formulated the idea of three-dimensional space being conceptual. To Gibson, perception is a compilation of the person's environment and how the person interacts with it.

James Gibson's major contributions throughout his career were published in three of his major works: The Perception of the Visual World (1950), The Senses Considered as Perceptual Systems (1966), and The Ecological Approach to Visual Perception (1979).

Much of Gibson's work on perception derives from his time spent in the U.S. Army Air Force. Here, he delved into thoughts on how imperative perception is on daily functions. His work may be the first to show a distinct difference between types of perception. Form perception, on one hand, is a display of two static displays, whereas object perception, involves one of the displays to be in motion. Gibson laid down the base for empirical perception research throughout his lifetime. He did work on adaptation and inspection of curved lines, which became a precursor for perceptual research later. His basic work rejected the perspective that perception in and of itself is meaningless, he instead argued meaning is independent of the perceiver. He claimed that the environment decides perception, and that meaning is in what the environment "affords" the observer.

=== Major works ===
In his classic work The Perception of the Visual World (1950) he rejected the then fashionable theory of behaviorism for a view based on his own experimental work, which pioneered the idea that animals 'sampled' information from the 'ambient' outside world. He studied the concept of optical flow (later published as part of his theory of affordance). According to Gibson, one determines the optical flow (which can be described as the apparent flow of the movement of objects in the visual field relative to the observer) using the pattern of light on the retina. The term 'affordance' refers to the opportunities for action provided by a particular object or environment. This concept has been extremely influential in the field of design and ergonomics: see for example the work of Donald Norman who interacted with Gibson and who adapted Gibson's idea of affordances (with significant conceptual amendments) to industrial design.

In his later work (such as, for example, The Ecological Approach to Visual Perception (1979)), Gibson became more philosophical and criticised cognitivism in the same way he had attacked behaviorism before. Gibson argued strongly in favour of direct perception and direct realism (as pioneered by the Scottish philosopher Thomas Reid), as opposed to cognitivist indirect realism. He termed his new approach ecological psychology. He also rejected the information processing view of cognition. Gibson is increasingly influential on many contemporary movements in psychology, particularly those considered to be post-cognitivist. One of the most important statements in this book is that Gibson maintains that the optical information of an image is not an impression of form and color, but rather of invariants. A fixated form of an object only specifies certain invariants of the object, not its solid form. (p. 227) Meaning that there is far more information available to our perceptual systems than we are consciously aware of, which may lead us to puzzle over 'invariances' that our visual or other systems easily solve. Gibson did work on perception with his wife, Eleanor J Gibson. Together they proposed perceptual learning as a process of seeing the differences in the perceptual field around an individual. An early example of this is the classic research study done by Eleanor Gibson and R. D. Walk, the visual cliff experiment. In this experiment an infant that was new to crawling was found to be sensitive to depth of an edge.

=== Ecology and perception ===
Gibson believed that the environment and animals are not separable items. He stated that without the environment animals cannot survive and without animals there is no environment. The environment is what we perceive at any given moment. All animals are able to perceive. Humans perceive the environment directly. This is why we are unable to perceive things in the environment that are too small to see, such as an atom.

=== Affordances ===
Gibson coined the noun affordance. For Gibson the noun affordance pertains to the environment providing the opportunity for action. Affordances require a relationship in which the environment and the animal can work together. An example is that mankind has changed the environment to better suit our needs. When coming across Earth's natural steep slopes, man designed stairs in order to afford walking. In addition, objects in the environment can also afford many different behaviors, such as lifting or grasping. Gibson argued that when we perceive an object we observe the object's affordances and not its particular qualities. He believed that perceiving affordances of an object is easier than perceiving the many different qualities an object may have. Affordances can be related to different areas of the habitat as well. Some areas of the world allow for concealing while some allow for foraging.

== Legacy ==
James J. Gibson left a lasting impact on the way that psychologists and philosophers conceptualize perception and action. He rejected the behaviorists' assumptions that learning involves the formation of associations between stimuli and responses, adopting instead a holistic view related to that of the Gestalt psychologist Kurt Koffka with whom he had contact. He argued that the perceived environment is not composed by stitching together such elements as shapes and edges, but rather that the world is made up of meaningful features that are experienced continuously as wholes. He will perhaps be best remembered for his theory of affordances, which some theorists have suggested provides a fundamental way to understand the duality of mind and external reality.

Previous theories of sensory meaning have argued that perceptions are separate and private from one another. This stance placed all of the perceptive meaning on the individual, which meant there was no way to find common ground on individuals' shared experiences. Gibson contended that when stimulus information is being sought out, meaningful properties of that stimulus are also perceived relationally. For instance, a softball affords "throwing" if the observer notices that the ball fits well in a person's hand, and that the weight allows it to be thrown. The training of aviators is a practical application of Gibson's views, which such suggest that training should be as realistic and unconstrained as possible.

Gibson's work indicates the interactivity of observers and the natural environment, and has been dubbed ecological psychology as a result. Gibson also argued that perceptual experimenters were misguided in their control over physical variables of stimuli, whereas the ecological significance of the stimulus should be manipulated instead. This stance breaks from traditional thought in that Gibson posited that fundamentally sound experiments could be conducted in the external world without having to construct artificial laboratory settings.

== Publications ==
- —; Crooks, Laurence E. (1938). "A theoretical field-analysis of automobile-driving". The American Journal of Psychology. 51 (3): 453. doi:10.2307/1416145. JSTOR 1416145. Check pages
- — (1947). Motion Picture Testing and Research. Aviation Psychology Program Research Reports. Washington, D.C.: U.S. Government Printing Office.
- —; Gibson, Eleanor J. (1955). "Perceptual learning: Differentiation or enrichment?". Psychological Review. 62 (1): 32–41. doi:10.1037/h0048826. ISSN 1939-1471. PMID 14357525.
- — (1950). The perception of the visual world. Boston: Houghton Mifflin.
- — (1960). "The concept of the stimulus in psychology". American Psychologist. 15 (11): 694–703. doi:10.1037/h0047037. ISSN 1935-990X.
- — (1966). The senses considered as perceptual systems. Boston: Houghton Mifflin. ISBN 978-0-313-23961-8.
- — (1972). "A theory of direct visual perception". In Royce, Joseph R.; Rozeboom, William Warren (eds.). The psychology of knowing. New York: Gordon and Breach. Republished as "A theory of direct visual perception". Vision and mind: Selected readings in the philosophy of perception. The MIT Press. 25 October 2002. pp. 77–91. doi:10.7551/mitpress/7111.003.0007. ISBN 978-0-262-28071-6.
- — (1977). "The theory of affordances" (PDF). In Shaw, Robert; Bransford, John (eds.). Perceiving, acting, and knowing: Toward an ecological psychology. Hillsdale, NJ: Lawrence Erlbaum. pp. 67–82. doi:10.4324/9781315467931. ISBN 978-1-315-46791-7. Republished as Gieseking, J.J.; Mangold, W.; Katz, C.; Low, S.; Saegert, S., eds. (2014-04-16). "The theory of affordances". The People, Place, and Space Reader. Routledge. pp. 56ff. ISBN 978-1-317-81188-6.
- — (1979). The ecological approach to visual perception. Houghton Mifflin. ISBN 978-0-395-27049-3. Republished as The ecological approach to visual perception. Hillsdale, New Jersey: Lawrence Erlbaum Associates. 1986. ISBN 0-89859-958-X.
- — (1982). Reed, E.; Jones, R. (eds.). Reasons for realism: Selected essays of James J. Gibson. Hillsdale, New Jersey: Lawrence Erlbaum Associates. ISBN 978-0-89859-207-8.
