= Charles Edward Garman =

American philosophy professor (1850–1907)

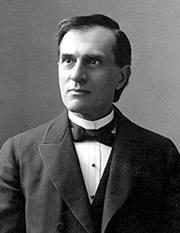
- Born: December 18, 1850; Limington, Maine, U.S.
- Died: February 9, 1907 (aged 56); Amherst, Massachusetts, U.S.

Academic background
- Education: Amherst College; Yale Divinity School

Academic work
- Discipline: Philosophy
- Institutions: Amherst College
- Notable students: Calvin Coolidge; Frederick J. E. Woodbridge; Robert S. Woodworth

Charles Edward Garman (December 18, 1850 – February 9, 1907) was an American philosopher who was professor of philosophy at Amherst College. He taught pupils such as Calvin Coolidge and Robert S. Woodworth. He is credited with influencing Woodworth towards a career in psychology.

== Biography ==
Garman was born on December 18, 1850, in Limington, Maine. Garman married Eliza Miner in 1882. He died on February 9, 1907, in Amherst, Massachusetts.

The joint papers of Charles E. Garman and Eliza Miner Garman Family Papers 1862–1932 are housed in the Special Collections Department at Amherst College's Frost Library. The collection contains correspondence, papers, essays, pamphlets, notes, notebooks and diaries relating to the personal and professional life of Charles Edward Garman, Professor of Moral and Mental Philosophy at Amherst College. His teaching career is represented by the printed pamphlets he distributed in his classes and by lecture notes taken by his students.
