= Barbara Nodine =

Applied cognitive psychologist (born 1937)

- Occupations: Psychologist and Educator
- Awards: CASE Professor of the Year Arcadia University Award in (1989); Robert S. Daniel Teaching Excellence Award (1996); APF Distinguished Teaching Award (1999); Presidential Citation, Society for the Teaching of Psychology (2006)

Academic background
- Education: Bucknell University (BA), University of Massachusetts (PhD)

Academic work
- Institutions: Arcadia University (formerly Beaver College)

Barbara F. Nodine (July 19, 1937 – March 29, 2026) was a psychologist and educator whose work included applied cognitive psychology and the teaching of psychology. She was a professor at Arcadia University, formerly Beaver College, and served as the university's provost from 2014 to 2016. She served terms as President of the Society for the Teaching of Psychology (1980-1981) and the Eastern Psychological Association (2000-2001).

Nodine's work on the teaching of psychology included incorporating writing into courses and developing classroom activities. She co-authored Writing in the Arts and Sciences (1981) and co-edited the fourth volume of the Activities Handbook for the Teaching of Psychology (1999).

Her teaching received national recognition through the Robert S. Daniel Teaching Excellence Award in 1996, the American Psychological Foundation's Distinguished Teaching Award in 1999, and a Presidential Citation from the Society for the Teaching of Psychology in 2006.

== Biography ==
Nodine earned a bachelor's degree in psychology at Bucknell University and doctorate at the University of Massachusetts Amherst. In her 2005 autobiography, she described completing her PhD in three years. Before joining Beaver College, she raised three children and occasionally worked part time in teaching positions.

After a year of teaching part-time at Beaver College, Nodine was offered a full-time tenure-track position. She started teaching a two-semester introductory psychology course and later went on to chair the psychology department. In her autobiography, she described developing classroom activities to engage students in learning during the early 1970s. She also served as interim dean of the College of Arts and Sciences before becoming provost and vice president for academic affairs in 2014 through 2016. She later received the title of professor emerita of psychology.

From 1989 to 1992, Nodine directed the Summer Experimental Program, a collaboration with the Community College of Philadelphia with support from the William Penn Foundation. As described in her autobiography, the program sought to help students at risk of not completing their undergraduate degrees.

She received several teaching honors including Beaver College's Lindback Distinguished Teaching Award in 1975 and Professor of the Year in 1989, followed by national teaching awards in 1996 and 1999. The Society for the Teaching of Psychology lists her as a Harry Kirke Wolfe Lecturer for 1994, and she was awarded their Presidential Citation in 2006. She was a fellow of the American Psychological Association, the Society for the Teaching of Psychology, and the Association for Psychological Science.

The university honored Nodine at its Women Who Lead event in 2022. In 2025, a university magazine article reported that her donation funded a digital kiosk in Grey Towers Castle, which holds and displays the records of Arcadia's honorary degree recipients.

Nodine was formerly married to Calvin F. Nodine, a psychologist associated with the University of Pennsylvania's radiology department. They had three children. She died on March 29, 2026, aged 88.

== Research ==
Nodine's early research included an experimental study of paired associate learning, where participants learn associations between paired items. A 1966 paper she published with Calvin F. Nodine examined stimulus durations and task difficulty, whereas her later work included incorporating writing into course instruction and the teaching of psychology.

With Elaine P. Maimon and other colleagues, Nodine explored implementing writing as part of learning across academic disciplines. The WAC Clearinghouse highlights their Writing in the Arts and Sciences (1981) as an early textbook in the writing across the curriculum movement. It addressed writing as a means of learning and the writing conventions of different academic disciplines. Her early research included a 1978 study with Maimon on sentence combining practices and syntactic development among college freshmen, and a 1980 article with Theresa A. Spiegel, Samuel M. Cameron, and Richard Evans on incorporating writing into psychology courses. In 1990, Nodine served as guest editor of a Teaching of Psychology special issue devoted to writing in the discipline.

Nodine also worked with Edna Barenbaum and Phyllis Newcomer on children's story composition, which included comparing children with learning disabilities, children with reading disabilities, and children without those disabilities. Their 1988 study compared written and dictated compositions among children with learning disabilities and normally achieving and low achieving children across three grade levels. In this study, dictation did not improve story production or fluency, and children made more coherence errors when dictating. Children with learning disabilities produced fewer stories and were less fluent than the comparison groups under both conditions.

In 1996, Nodine also worked with James H. Korn and Mary Beth Sweetman to examine consultants' evaluations of undergraduate psychology departments, identifying common concerns and recommendations for improving the programs. She also contributed to classroom teaching resources as a co-editor of the Activities Handbook for the Teaching of Psychology, Volume 4 (1999). The handbook offered more than 80 demonstrations, experiments, discussions, and simulations for teaching psychological concepts, with guidance on the concepts, materials, and class time needed for each activity .

== Representative publications ==
- Korn, J. H., Sweetman, M. B., & Nodine, B. F. (1996). An analysis of and commentary on consultants' reports on undergraduate psychology programs. Teaching of Psychology, 23(1), 14-19. https://doi.org/10.1207/s15328023top2301_2
- Maimon, E. P., & Nodine, B. F. (1978). Measuring syntactic growth: Errors and expectations in sentence-combining practice with college freshmen. Research in the Teaching of English, 12(3), 233-244. https://doi.org/10.58680/rte197817902
- Newcomer, P. L., Barenbaum, E. M., & Nodine, B. F. (1988). Comparison of the story production of LD, normal-achieving, and low-achieving children under two modes of production. Learning Disability Quarterly, 11(2), 82-96. https://doi.org/10.2307/1510986
- Nodine, B. F., Barenbaum, E., & Newcomer, P. (1985). Story composition by learning disabled, reading disabled, and normal children. Learning Disability Quarterly, 8(3), 167-179. https://doi.org/10.2307/1510891
- Nodine, C. F., & Nodine, B. F. (1966). Stimulus intervals, stimulus durations, and difficulty level in paired-associates learning. Journal of Experimental Psychology, 72(1), 156-158. https://doi.org/10.1037/h0023341
- Spiegel, T. A., Cameron, S. M., Evans, R., & Nodine, B. F. (1980). Integrating writing into the teaching of psychology: An alternative to Calhoun and Selby. Teaching of Psychology, 7(4), 242-243. https://doi.org/10.1207/s15328023top0704_18

== Books ==
Nodine also authored student study guides for an introductory psychology textbook by Benjamin, Hopkins, and Nation. In her autobiography, she noted that her study guide accompanied three editions of the textbook.

- Benjamin, L. T., Jr., Nodine, B. F., Ernst, R. M., & Blair Broeker, C. (Eds.). (1999). Activities handbook for the teaching of psychology (Vol. 4). American Psychological Association.
- Maimon, E. P., Belcher, G. L., Hearn, G. W., Nodine, B. F., & O'Connor, F. W. (1981). Writing in the arts and sciences. Winthrop Publishers.
- Maimon, E. P., Belcher, G. L., Hearn, G. W., Nodine, B. F., & O'Connor, F. W. (1984). Readings in the arts and sciences. Little, Brown.
- Maimon, E. P., Nodine, B. F., & O'Connor, F. W. (Eds.). (1989). Thinking, reasoning, and writing. Longman.
