= Midlife crisis =

Transition of identity and self-confidence

A midlife crisis is a transition of identity and self-confidence that can occur in middle-aged individuals, typically 40 to 65 years old. The phenomenon is described as a psychological crisis brought about by events that highlight a person's growing age, inevitable mortality, and possible lack of accomplishments in life. This may produce feelings of intense depression, remorse, and high levels of anxiety; or the desire to achieve youthfulness, make drastic changes to their current lifestyle, or change past decisions and events.

== Crisis versus stressors ==
Personality and a history of psychological crisis are believed to predispose some people to this "traditional" midlife crisis. People going through midlife crisis have a variety of symptoms and exhibit a disparate range of behaviors.

Mid-life is the time from years 45 to 60 where a person is often evaluating their own life. However, many mid-life stressors are often labeled as a mid-life crisis. Day-to-day stressors are likely to add up and be thought of as a crisis, but in reality, it is simply an "overload". Individuals in mid-life often become overwhelmed by the fact that they have more control over their life than they did in younger years, and have more control than they will in later years. This realization of greater individual control acts as a stressor as it pertains to a midlife crisis.

Many middle-aged adults experience major life events that can cause a period of psychological stress or depression, such as the death of a loved one, or a career setback. However, those events could have happened earlier or later in life, making them a "crisis," but not necessarily a mid-life one. In the same study, 15% of middle-aged adults experienced this type of midlife turmoil. Though stressors are equally distributed by educational status, those with less education feel stressors more strongly, contributing to a mid-life crisis.

Studies indicate that some cultures may be more sensitive to this phenomenon than others; one study found that there is little evidence that people undergo midlife crises in Japanese and Indian cultures, raising the question of whether a mid-life crisis is mainly a cultural construct. It appears that the experience of increasing in age into what is considered old is significantly different in each culture. The authors hypothesized that the "culture of youth", the prolonging of youth practices, and the emerging adult development phase in Western societies accounts for the popularity of the mid-life crisis concept there.

Researchers have found that mid-life is often a time for reflection and reassessment, but this is not always accompanied by the psychological upheaval popularly associated with a "mid-life crisis." Those who made career or job changes early in life were less likely to experience a crisis in midlife.

== Occurrence ==
The condition may occur from the ages of 45–60. Because there is often a wide variety of factors that can contribute to the cause of a midlife crisis, there is not a noticeable difference between how men and women experience midlife crises. A mid-life crisis could be caused by aging itself, or aging in combination with changes, problems, or regrets over:

- work or career (or lack thereof)
- spousal relationships (or lack thereof)
- maturation of children (or their absence)
- aging or death of parents
- physical changes associated with aging

Mid-life crisis can affect men and women differently because their stressors differ. An American cultural stereotype of a man going through a midlife crisis may include the purchase of a luxury item such as an exotic car, or seeking intimacy with a younger woman. Some men seek younger women who are able to procreate, not necessarily with an intention to produce offspring. A man's midlife crisis is more likely to be caused by work issues, a woman's crisis by personal evaluations of their roles. Even though there are differences between why men and women go through a midlife crisis, the emotions that either gender encounters can be intense.

One of the main characteristics of a mid-life crisis is that one assumes their mid-life is about to be eventful, usually in a negative way, and potentially stressful. Psychologist Oliver Robinson's research characterizes each decade of life by describing frequent occurrences or situations particular to those age periods. He describes that a crisis can begin in a person's early 20s, when they usually try to map out their whole life. Moreover, the later age period, between 50 and 60, may be a time of illness or even the thought of death. Such a deadline may convince a middle-aged person that their life needs to be lived as expected.

Individuals experiencing a mid-life crisis may feel:

- a deep sense of remorse for goals that have not been accomplished
- a fear of humiliation among more successful colleagues
- longing to achieve a feeling of youthfulness
- need to spend more time alone or with certain peers
- a heightened sense of their sexuality or lack of it
- boredom, confusion, resentment or anger due to their discontent with their marital, work, health, economic, or social status
- ambition to right the missteps they feel they have taken early in life

== Treatment and prevention ==
Physical changes that commonly occur during these years are weight gain, wrinkles, sagging skin, and hair loss. Regular exercise and maintenance of a nutritious diet may help to sustain one's physical and mental health during these years of transition.

Significant changes made early in life may prevent one from having a mid-life crisis. Susan Krauss Whitbourne found changing jobs before midlife yields a greater sense of generativity, motivation to deviate from stagnation, and desire to help the younger generation thrive. This is a psychological stage proposed by Erik Erikson that describes the normal stage adults go through during their mid-life years.

== Theoretical basis ==
The notion of the mid-life crisis began with followers of Sigmund Freud, who thought that during middle age everyone's thoughts were driven by the fear of impending death. Although mid-life crisis has lately received more attention in popular culture than serious research, there are some theoretical constructs supporting the notion. Jungian theory holds that mid-life is key to individuation, a process of self-actualization and self-awareness that contains many potential paradoxes. Although Carl Jung did not describe midlife crisis per se, the mid-life integration of thinking, sensation, feeling, and intuition that he describes could, it seems, lead to confusion about one's life and goals.

Erik Erikson's life stage of generativity versus stagnation also coincides with the idea of a mid-life crisis. Erikson believed that in this stage adults begin to understand the pressure of being committed to improving the lives of generations to come. In this stage a person realizes the inevitability of mortality and the virtue of this stage is the creating of a better world for future generations in order for the human race to grow. If generativity is not established a person will fall into a state of self-absorption in which their personal needs and comforts become their main concern. Stagnation is the lack of psychological movement or growth. Instead of helping the community a person is barely able to help their own family. Those who experience stagnation do not invest in the growth of themselves or others.

== Criticism ==
Some people have challenged the existence of mid-life crises altogether. One study found that 23% of participants had what they called a "midlife crisis", but in digging deeper, only one-third of those—8% of the total—said the crisis was associated with awareness of aging.

The balance (15% of those surveyed) had experienced major life experiences or transitions such as divorce or loss of a job in middle age and described them as "midlife crisis". While there is no doubt these events can be traumatic—the associated grief reactions can be indistinguishable from depression.

Costa and McCrae (1980) found little evidence for an increase in neuroticism in midlife. While they did find that some people were likely to experience such crises, these individuals were likely to experience crises in their 20s and 30s, and these experiences were not unique to midlife. Robinson, Rosenberg, and Farrell (1999) re-interviewed 500 men. Looking back over their midlife period, it became evident that while not necessarily entailing crisis, it was a time for re-evaluation.

Wrapping up their review of men's mid-life crisis, Aldwin and Levenson wrote that "... Given the bulk of the data, it is likely that, for most men, mid-life is a time of achievement and satisfaction. For a certain proportion of men, however, the passage is not at all smooth." They found a similar pattern when they reviewed research on what are commonly thought to be triggers for women's mid-life crisis: menopause, children leaving home, the "sandwich" of caring for both parents and children. Most women navigated those periods without a traumatic psychological "crisis".

The enduring popularity of the mid-life crisis concept may be explained by another finding by Robinson et al. As Alwin and Levenson summarize: "... younger men, now middle-aged Baby Boomers, used the term "midlife crisis" to describe nearly any setback, either in their career or family life."

Levenson researched the possible existence of a midlife crisis and its implications. Whereas Levenson (1978) found that 80% of middle-aged participants had a crisis, and Ciernia (1985) reported that 70% of men in midlife said they had a crisis (Shek, 1996) others could not replicate those findings including Shek (1996), Kruger (1994), McCrae and Costa (1990). The debate of whether or not there is a midlife crisis is being answered through recent research that attempts to balance such factors as response bias and experimenter effects in order to establish internal validity. The above mentioned research does not support Levenson's model of a single age in the middle years that is a designated time of transition and potential "crisis". Instead, changes in personality can occur throughout the adult years with no peak in general distress or psychosocial crisis.

Recently, a new study by Giuntella et al. (2022), circulated as a working paper at the National Bureau of Economic Research, attempts to provide hard evidence on the presence of a midlife crisis. Using longitudinal data on 500,000 individuals, they document a crisis of midlife in affluent nations. This confirms academic work previously done using subjective well-being data. They find that "midlife is a time when people disproportionately take their own lives, have trouble sleeping, are clinically depressed, spend time thinking about suicide, feel life is not worth living, find it hard to concentrate, forget things, feel overwhelmed in their workplace, suffer from disabling headaches, and become dependent on alcohol." Given access to a rich set of controls, their results do not depend on a single nation, nor do they show midlife crisis to be a function of the presence of young children, nor is it related to workers' productivity. Additionally, the effect is robust to cohort effects. Patterns of the male midlife crisis mimick that of female's. This reduces the likelihood that the crisis is caused by gender-related differences. "

Many view mid-life as a negative, but in reality many experience this time positively. Instead of a mid-life crisis being a crisis, it can be an opportunity for growth and progress towards goals. Middle life is important for exploration and growth. It is the crisis parts that can allow a person to re-evaluate how they are progressing towards their goal and make substantial changes to their life to allow them to obtain those goals.

If looked at as a time of personal growth, the experience can be greatly beneficial and rewarding. If treated as a transitional phase, psychologists believe the initial experience may be difficult and confusing but as time passes it becomes an experience of self-growth and self-realization.

== See also ==
- Angst
- Anxiety
- Disenchantment
- Empty nest syndrome
- Existential crisis
- Fear
- Gerascophobia
- Meaning of life
- Mono no aware
- Panic
- Quarter-life crisis
- Saturn return
