= Woodworth Personal Data Sheet =

Personality test developed by Robert S. Woodworth

The Woodworth Personal Data Sheet, sometimes known as the Woodworth Psychoneurotic Inventory, was a personality test, commonly cited as the first personality test, developed by Robert S. Woodworth during World War I for the United States Army. It was published in 1918 and it was developed to screen recruits for shell shock risk but was not completed in time to be used for this purpose. It instead became widely used in psychological research and led to the development of many other personality tests. It has been described as "the linear ancestor of all subsequent personality inventories, schedules and questionnaires".

== Construction ==
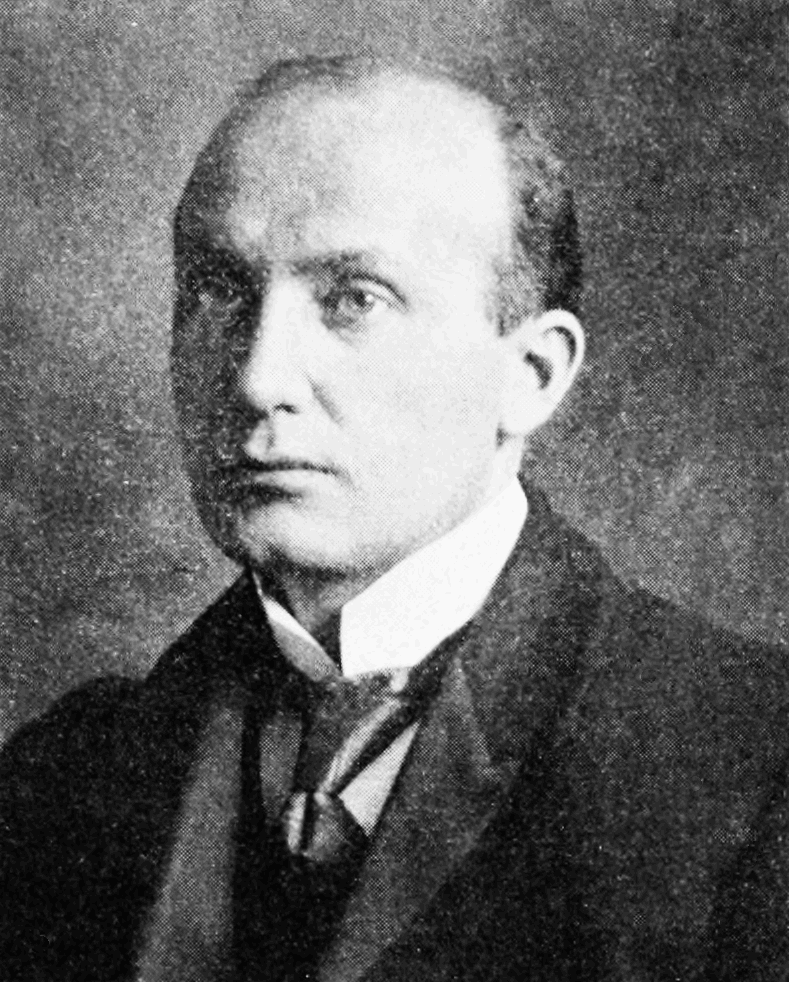
Woodworth, developer of the WPDS.

Questions for the test were generated by Woodworth based on his interviews with psychologists and case studies of persons with psychological disturbance. This set of items was then given to a group of subjects deemed to be normal and items answered too frequently were removed. The reduced set of questions was then given to a large sample of servicemen and a smaller sample of "diagnosed abnormal subjects". With these results the test was submitted to the Surgeon General who accepted it and a preliminary program of recruit screening was established where recruits who scored high on the test would be referred to a psychologist for further evaluation.

Some attempts were made to weight items according to their discriminating power, but this was found to not improve the reliability of scores and was so abandoned. The content of the items covered somatic symptoms, medical history, family history and social adjustment. The final form consisted of 116 yes or no questions.

=== Example items ===
- 1. Do you usually feel well and strong? (reverse scored) Yes
- 4. Are you troubled with dreams about your work? No
- 25. Have you ever fainted away? No
- 110. Has any of your family committed suicide? No
- 116. Do you like outdoor life? (reverse scored) Yes

== Revisions ==
During the early years most psychological tests were revisions of the WPI, which, with its 116 questions, provided ample material.

In 1920 Buford Johnson adapted the test to produce a version for children between 10 and 16, taking 51 questions from the WPI and adding nine of his own. In 1923 Ellen Matthew produced another adaptation for children, taking 23 questions directly, modifying 33 slightly and adding 28 new questions. Also in 1923 V. M. Cady took all the questions from the WPI and the questions Johnson added in his revision and reworked them for an adolescent audience.

The items of the WPI were in the pool used to produce the Thurstone Personality Schedule in 1930.

Even some modern tests, such as the Symptom Checklist-90-Revised, have questions that can be traced back to the WPI.
