= Psychological Review =

Peer-reviewed academic journal

- Discipline: Psychology
- Language: English
- Edited by: Elena L. Grigorenko

Publication details
- History: 1894–present
- Publisher: American Psychological Association (United States)
- Frequency: Bimonthly
- Impact factor: 5.8 (2024)

Standard abbreviations
- ISO 4: Psychol. Rev.

Indexing
- ISSN: 0033-295X (print); 1939-1471 (web)
- OCLC no.: 1318836

Links
- Journal homepage; Online archive

Psychological Review is a bimonthly peer-reviewed academic journal that covers psychological theory. It was established by James Mark Baldwin (Princeton University) and James McKeen Cattell (Columbia University) in 1894 as a publication vehicle for psychologists not connected with the laboratory of G. Stanley Hall (Clark University), who often published in his American Journal of Psychology. Psychological Review soon became the most prominent and influential psychology journal in North America, publishing important articles by William James, John Dewey, James Rowland Angell, and many others.

According to the Journal Citation Reports, the journal has a 2024 impact factor of 5.8.

The journal has implemented the Transparency and Openness Promotion guidelines that provide structure to research planning and reporting and aim to make research more transparent, accessible, and reproducible.

== History ==
In the early years of the 20th century, Baldwin purchased Cattell's interest in the journal, but was forced to sell the journal to Howard Warren in 1908 when scandal forced him out of his professorship at Johns Hopkins University (where he had moved in 1903). Editorship of the journal fell to Baldwin's newly hired young colleague John B. Watson, who used the journal to advance his school of behaviorism. Psychological Review was eventually sold by Warren to the American Psychological Association, which has owned it ever since.

=== Editors-in-chief ===
The following persons are or have been editor-in-chief of the journal:

- 1894–1903: James McKeen Cattell (Columbia University), James Mark Baldwin (Princeton University)
- 1904–1908: James Mark Baldwin (Johns Hopkins University), Howard C. Warren (Princeton University)
- 1909: James Mark Baldwin, Howard C. Warren, John B. Watson (Johns Hopkins University)
- 1910–1915: John B. Watson
- 1916–1933: Howard C. Warren
- 1934–1948: Herbert S. Langfeld (Princeton University)
- 1949–1953: Carroll C. Pratt (Princeton University)
- 1954–1958: Theodore M. Newcomb (University of Michigan)
- 1959–1964: Richard L. Solomon (Harvard University)
- 1965–1970: Charles N. Cofer (Pennsylvania State University)
- 1971–1976: George Mandler (University of California, San Diego)
- 1977–1982: William K. Estes (Rockefeller University)
- 1983–1988: Martin Hoffman (New York University)
- 1989–1994: Walter Kintsch (University of Colorado)
- 1995–2000: Robert A. Bjork (University of California, Los Angeles)
- 2001–2003: Walter Mischel (Columbia University)
- 2004–2010: Keith Rayner (University of Massachusetts Amherst)
- 2011–2015: John R. Anderson (Carnegie Mellon University)
- 2016–2021: Keith J. Holyoak (University of California, Los Angeles)
- 2022–present: Elena L. Grigorenko (University of Houston)
