= Keith Rayner (psychologist) =

Cognitive psychologist

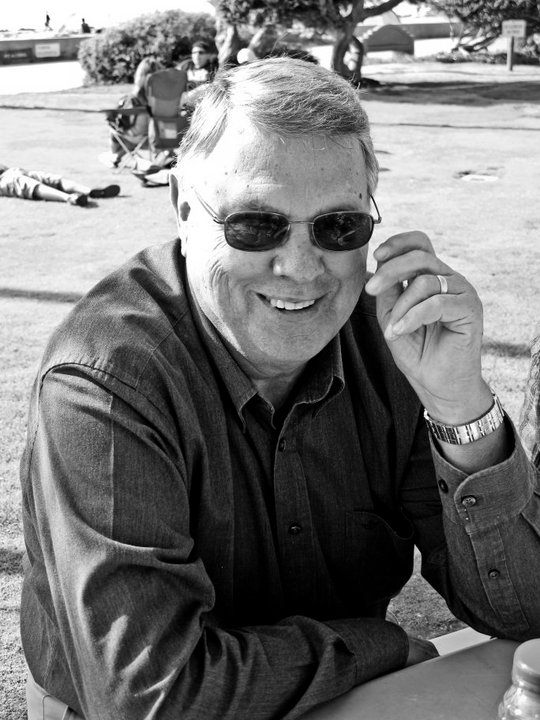
- Rayner at UCSD in 2011
- Born: June 20, 1943; Dover, England
- Died: January 21, 2015 (aged 71); San Diego, California, United States
- Education: Bachelor of Science, Master of Science at University of Utah; Ph.D. from Cornell University
- Known for: Cognitive Psychology, Eyetracking, Reading, Visual Perception
- Scientific career
- Fields: Cognitive Psychology
- Workplaces: University of California, San Diego; Atkinson Professor of Psychology

Keith Rayner (June 20, 1943 – January 21, 2015) was an American cognitive psychologist best known for pioneering modern eye-tracking methodology in reading and visual perception.

== Early life ==
Keith Rayner was born on June 20, 1943, in Dover, England, to William Thomas and Olive Stock Rayner. The family emigrated to the United States in 1949 and settled in Salt Lake City, Utah. He served a mission with the LDS Church to England from 1962 to 1964 and married Susan Rae Knight on December 16, 1966, at the Salt Lake Temple.

== Education and career ==
Rayner obtained his B.S. and M.S. degrees in psychology at the University of Utah and subsequently earned a Ph.D. in cognitive psychology from Cornell University with thesis titled The Perceptual Span and Peripheral Cues in Reading.

In 1973, he was appointed as an assistant professor of education, psychology, and visual science at University of Rochester. From there, he moved to the University of Massachusetts Amherst in 1978. In 2008, Rayner moved to University of California, San Diego, where he held the position of Atkinson Family Professor of Psychology. Rayner was the editor of the Journal of Experimental Psychology: Learning, Memory, and Cognition from 1990 to 1995 and editor of Psychological Review from 2004 to 2010.

=== Teaching positions ===
Rayner taught at the following universities:

- University of Rochester (Assistant Professor of Education, Psychology, and Visual Science)
- University of Massachusetts Amherst (Emeritus Distinguished Professor)
- Oxford University (Visiting Professor)
- Netherlands Institute for Advanced Study (Invited Visiting Fellow)
- University of Durham (Honorary Professor)
- Tianjin Normal University (Honorary Professor)
- University of Southampton (Honorary Professor)
- University of Potsdam (Visiting Humboldt Professor)
- University of California, San Diego (Atkinson Family Professor of Psychology)

== Death ==
On January 21, 2015, Rayner died of multiple myeloma in La Jolla, California, at the age of 71.

== Honors and awards ==
Rayner received numerous awards for his achievements. He received the University of Massachusetts Amherst Chancellor's Lifetime Achievement Award in 2006, the Bartlett Lecture Lifetime Achievement Award from the Experimental Psychology Society in 2007, an Alexander von Humboldt Foundation Research Award in 2009, and a UC San Diego Chancellor's Associates Research Award in 2010. Rayner was named Carnegie Centenary Professor for 2011 by the Carnegie Trust for the Universities of Scotland.
