= Frederick James Eugene Woodbridge =

Canadian-born American philosopher

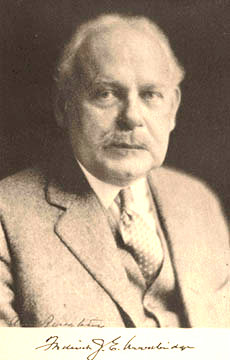
- Born: March 26, 1867; Windsor, Ontario, Canada
- Died: June 1, 1940 (aged 73); New York City, U.S.
- Spouse: Helena Belle Adams (m. 1895; died 1935)
- Children: 4, including Frederick James

Education
- Education: Amherst College; Union Theological Seminary; University of Berlin
- Academic advisor: Charles Edward Garman

Philosophical work
- Era: 20th-century philosophy
- Region: Western philosophy
- School: Naturalism
- Institutions: Columbia University
- Doctoral students: William Barrett; Edwin Arthur Burtt; Richard McKeon
- Notable students: Irwin Edman; Horace L. Friess; Sidney Hook; Jack Randall

Frederick James Eugene Woodbridge (March 26, 1867 – June 1, 1940) was a Canadian-born American philosopher. Woodbridge considered himself a naïve realist, deeply impressed with George Santayana. He spent much of his career as a dean (of the Faculties of Political Science, Philosophy, and Pure Science) at Columbia University, where a residence hall and a professorship in philosophy are named in his honor. He was editor of the Journal of Philosophy, Psychology and Scientific Methods.

== Biography ==
He was born on March 26, 1867, in Windsor, Ontario, to James Woodbridge and Melissa Ella Bingham. In 1869, his family moved to Kalamazoo, Michigan. In 1885, he enrolled at Amherst College where he studied philosophy and religion under Charles Edward Garman. He graduated from Amherst with an A.B. in 1889, and then he enrolled at the Union Theological Seminary. In 1892, he left Union on a fellowship and went to Germany to study philosophy at the University of Berlin, where he received the Ph.D. He returned to the United States in 1894. He took a teaching position at the University of Minnesota. He married Helena Belle Adams of Cincinnati, Ohio, on June 25, 1895, in Chicago, Illinois. They had 4 children, Frederick James Woodbridge, John Woodbridge, Donald Woodbridge, and Helena Woodbridge.

In 1902, Woodbridge left the University of Minnesota for New York City and a position at Columbia University. In 1904, he co-founded with James McKeen Cattell, The Journal of Philosophy, Psychology and Scientific Methods. Woodbridge taught philosophy at Columbia from 1902 until 1912, when he became the university's Dean of the Faculties of Political Science, Philosophy, and Pure Science. In 1929, he retired as Dean but continued to teach. He retired from teaching in 1937, but he continued to edit The Journal of Philosophy until his death in 1940.

He died on June 1, 1940, in Manhattan, New York City. His funeral was at St. Paul's Chapel.

== Legacy ==
Woodbridge Hall, a Columbia University dormitory located at 431 Riverside Drive, is named in his honor.

== Works ==
- The Purpose of History (1916)
- The Realm of Mind (1926)
- The Son of Apollo: Themes of Plato (1929)
- Nature and Mind: Selected Essays (1937)
- An Essay on Nature (1940)
- Aristotle's Vision of Nature (ed. John H. Randall Jr., 1965)
