= Robert S. Woodworth =

American psychologist (1869–1962)

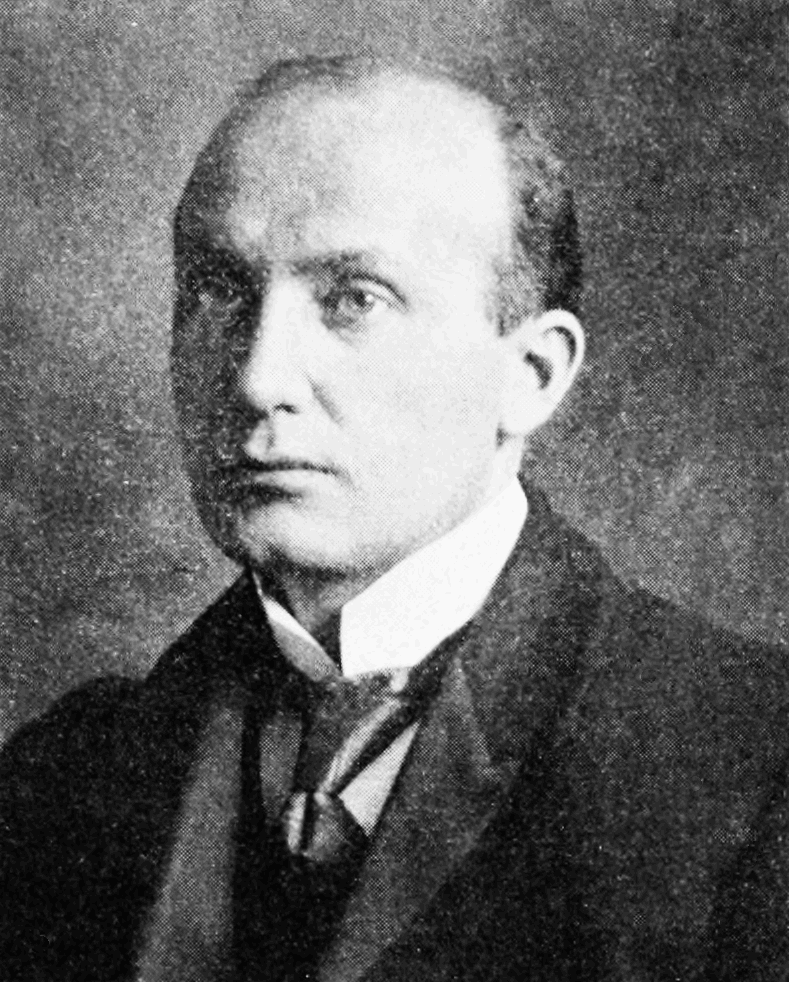
- Woodworth in 1909
- Born: Robert Sessions Woodworth; October 17, 1869; Belchertown, Massachusetts, U.S.
- Died: July 4, 1962 (aged 92); New York City, U.S.
- Education: Amherst College (AB); Harvard University (AM); Columbia University (PhD)
- Known for: Woodworth Personal Data Sheet
- Scientific career
- Fields: Psychology
- Workplaces: Columbia University
- Thesis: The Accuracy of Voluntary Movement (1899)
- Doctoral advisor: James McKeen Cattell
- Other academic advisors: Charles Edward Garman

Robert Sessions Woodworth (October 17, 1869 – July 4, 1962) was an American psychologist and the creator of the personality test which bears his name. A graduate of Harvard and Columbia, he studied under William James along with other prominent psychologists as Leta Stetter Hollingworth, James Rowland Angell, and Edward Thorndike. His textbook Psychology: A study of mental life, which appeared first in 1921, went through many editions and was the first introduction to psychology for generations of undergraduate students. His 1938 textbook of experimental psychology was scarcely less influential, especially in the 1954 second edition, written with Harold H. Schlosberg.

Woodworth is known for introducing the Stimulus-Organism-Response (S-O-R) formula of behavior. He was elected to the American Academy of Arts and Sciences in 1935 and the American Philosophical Society in 1936. A Review of General Psychology survey, published in 2002, ranked Woodworth as the 88th most cited psychologist of the 20th century, tied with John Garcia, James J. Gibson, David Rumelhart, Louis Leon Thurstone, and Margaret Floy Washburn.

== Early life ==
Woodworth was born in Belchertown, Massachusetts on October 17, 1869. His father was a Congregationalist minister who had graduated from Yale College and Yale Divinity School, and his mother was a teacher who had graduated from Mount Holyoke College. Since Woodworth's mother was his father's third wife, he grew up in a large family with children from each of his father's marriages. His father's approach to parenting was authoritative and strict. He attended high school in Newton, Massachusetts with the plan of becoming a minister. He received his A.B. degree from Amherst College in 1891, focusing on religion, the classics, mathematics, science, and history. During his senior year, Woodworth took a class in psychology by Charles Edward Garman, which caused him to change his future plans. Rather than becoming a minister, he taught mathematics at a high school for two years and at a college for two years in Topeka, Kansas.

Following his stint as a teacher, Woodworth attended a lecture by G. Stanley Hall, and he was enthralled by Hall's emphasis on “the importance of discovery through investigation” (p. 374). The lecture had such a profound effect on Woodworth that he hung a sign labeled “investigation” over his desk at home. He then read James's Principles of Psychology, and he had a similar captivating experience to many other students interested in psychology of the time. He decided then to finally follow a career path in psychology.

In 1895, he returned to college as an undergraduate student at Harvard University, studying philosophy with Josiah Royce, psychology with William James, and history with George Santayana. Here at Harvard, he met Edward Lee Thorndike and Walter B. Cannon, and the three became longtime friends. While working with James, he encouraged Woodworth to keep a dream diary. The two were not able to find a significant correlation between the content of one's dreams and the day's events. However, Woodworth noted that he often dreamed about incomplete or interrupted topics and events, later emphasized by Bluma Zeigarnik with the Zeigarnik effect.

In 1896, Woodworth earned his A.M from Harvard, followed by being an assistant at the Harvard Medical School in the physiology department from 1897 to 1898. Here, he observed Cannon's experiments on hunger and emotions. James McKeen Cattell offered Woodworth a graduate fellowship at Columbia University, one of the two primary functionalist schools in psychology. In 1899, Woodworth earned his PhD under Cattell. His dissertation was entitled The Accuracy of Voluntary Movement.

== Academic life ==
=== Early research ===
Thorndike, who was now at Columbia, worked with Woodworth on the concept of transfer of training. These studies related to a significant issue of the time within education, as academics like James supported a "disciplinary subject" education under the assumption that the brain can be exercised. Many subjects like Latin were taught for their disciplinary value and not necessarily the subject matter. Woodworth and Thorndike empirically studied the benefits of a disciplinary education along with transfer of training and found no effect. However, as their contemporaries pointed out, they did not use a control group and, therefore, their studies had minimal value. In 1902, Woodworth accepted a fellowship to work with Charles Sherrington at the University of Liverpool. Sherrington and Cattell both offered him a job afterwards, and Woodworth accepted Cattell's offer to study at Columbia, where he remained for the rest of his life.

=== Psychometrics ===
Woodworth followed in Cattell's footsteps in psychological testing and measurement. He first was in charge of a project where he tested about 1,100 people at the 1904 St. Louis Exposition. According to Hothersall, he took a "remarkably sensible and fair-minded position on racial differences in test performance" (p. 376). Woodworth emphasized that that labeling is based on alleged differences both internal (mental function and size) and external (skin color), making it difficult to compare them empirically. The characteristics are not equally measurable, and individual differences are very important, according to Woodworth, so experiments that claim to demonstrate sharp differences in races ignore overlap within a population. Additionally, Woodworth disagreed with the norm of the time with labeling civilizations as "primitive" or "advanced" because he noted that differences on the evolutionary time scale are likely minute to produce a mental status change.

In 1906, the American Psychological Association appointed Woodworth as part of a committee to study psychometrics. With the onset of World War I, APA asked Woodworth to assist them in trying to prevent what was then known as "shell shock". He generated the Woodworth Personal Data Sheet (WPDS), which has been called the first personality test. It was a test of emotional stability to measure a soldier's susceptibility based on existing cases of the disorder. Although the test was designed too late for it to be used operationally, the test was highly influential in the development of later personality inventories with measures of neuroticism.

Woodworth published Psychology: A study of mental life, which appeared first in 1921, and Experimental Psychology in 1938, which he worked on for nearly twenty years, and they became the definitive texts for thousands of psychology students.

Additionally, Woodworth published Contemporary Schools of Psychology in 1932. He described the history of psychology according to a view that differing schools of psychology are complementary and not incompatible. This tolerant, open-minded view was likely a result of his unique perspective of psychology, being part of the subject for nearly the entire fifty years of its existence. He was renowned for this contribution, later being known as the dean of American Psychology.

In 1914, Woodworth was elected president of APA, and in his presidential address, he discussed the question of the existence of imageless thoughts. He spent the summer of 1912 working in Oswald Külpe's lab studying the topic much to Titchener's dismay. According to Titchener, imageless thoughts were not possible. Woodworth disagreed, stating that even if most thoughts have corresponding sensations and/or images, some do not.

Woodworth was strongly opposed to "epistemological tables of commandments" such as the strict and narrow approaches of Titchener and Watson, preferring a somewhat eclectic approach.

=== Motivational psychology ===
Woodworth introduced and popularized the expression Stimulus-Organism-Response (S-O-R) to describe his functionalist approach to psychology and to stress its difference from the strictly Stimulus-Response (S-R) approach of the behaviorists in his 1929 second edition of Psychology. He later published the theory in Dynamic Psychology (1918) and Dynamics of Behavior (1958).

Within his modified S-O-R formula, Woodworth noted that the stimulus elicits a different effect or response depending on the state of the organism. The "O" (for organismic) mediates the relationship between the stimulus and the response.

Woodworth advocated the creation of a technical vocabulary for psychology rather than only relying on often subjective operational definitions, but he was ignored by the community.

He conveniently ignores the fact that he held very important and influential positions, such as being chairman of the National Research Council's Division of Anthropology and Psychology, in his autobiography. He only mentions his participation, demonstrating his modesty.

In 1956, Woodworth was first recipient of the American Psychological Foundation gold medal for "Distinguished and continuous service to scholarship and research in psychology and for contributions to the growth of psychology though the medium of scientific publication" (p. 689).

A determined and persistent psychologist, Woodworth retired from Columbia at age 70, but he continued to lecture until age 89 and continued to write until age 91. Woodworth died on July 4, 1962.

More recently the theory has been extended to theorize that artificial organisms (AI-enabled systems) can also elicit responses.

== Sources ==
- Robert Sessions Woodworth—Biographical Memoirs of the National Academy of Sciences
- Woodworth, R S (February 1992). "The future of clinical psychology. 1937". Journal of Consulting and Clinical Psychology. 60 (1): 16–17. doi:10.1037/0022-006X.60.1.16. PMID 1556280.
- Heidbreder, E (August 1963). "Robert Sessions Woodworth 1869-1962". British Journal of Psychology. 54 (3): 199–200. doi:10.1111/j.2044-8295.1963.tb00876.x. PMID 14051441.
- Tunnell, E H (December 1962). "A bibliography of articles and books by Robert Sessions Woodworth: A continuation, 1938-1959". American Journal of Psychology. 75: 690–2. PMID 13994784.
