= Eleanor J. Gibson =

American psychologist and academic (1910–2002)

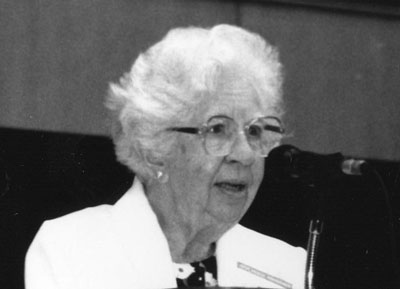
- Eleanor Gibson - Keynote Address - 1993 APS Convention
- Born: Eleanor Jack; December 7, 1910; Peoria, Illinois
- Died: December 30, 2002 (aged 92); Columbia, South Carolina
- Citizenship: American
- Education: Smith College (B.A., 1931) (M.S., 1933); Yale University (Ph.D., 1938)
- Known for: Visual cliff, perceptual learning, differentiation theory, enrichment of embedded structures
- Spouse: James J. Gibson
- Children: James J. Gibson Junior; Jean Gibson
- Awards: National Medal of Science (1992); APA Award for Distinguished Scientific Contributions to Psychology (1968); The American Psychological Foundation Gold Medal Award for Life Achievement in Science (1986)
- Scientific career
- Fields: Psychology, developmental psychology, comparative psychology, experimental psychology, ecological psychology
- Doctoral advisor: Clark L. Hull

Eleanor Jack Gibson (7 December 1910 – 30 December 2002) was an American psychologist who focused on reading development and perceptual learning in infants. Gibson began her career at Smith College as an instructor in 1932, publishing her first works on research conducted as an undergraduate student. Gibson was able to circumvent the many obstacles she faced due to the Great Depression and gender discrimination, by finding research opportunities that she could meld with her own interests.

Gibson, with her husband James J. Gibson, created the Gibsonian ecological theory of development, which emphasized how important perception was because it allows humans to adapt to their environments. Perhaps her most well-known contribution to psychology was the "visual cliff," which studied depth perception in both human and animal species, leading to a new understanding of perceptual development in infants. Gibson was elected to the National Academy of Sciences in 1971, the National Academy of Education in 1972, and to the American Academy of Arts and Sciences in 1977. In 1992, she was awarded the National Medal of Science.

== Early life and education ==
Eleanor (née Jack) Gibson was born on December 7, 1910, in Peoria, Illinois. Her father, William Alexander Jack, was a businessman who specialized in the wholesale of hardware. Her mother, Isabel Grier Jack, was a homemaker who graduated from Smith College. Gibson had one sibling, Emily Jack, who was born in 1916.

Gibson began attending Smith College at the age of sixteen with the intention of studying languages. She graduated in 1931 with a B.A. degree. While at Smith, she became interested in experimental psychology. Gibson completed her master's degree at Smith, graduating in 1933. In 1935, Gibson began her Ph.D. at Yale University. While attending Yale, Gibson became interested in comparative psychology. Originally, Gibson had asked Robert Yerkes to be her dissertation advisor. He declined, stating that he does not permit women to work in his lab. Clark L. Hull, a behavioural psychologist, became her dissertation supervisor, despite the fact that they did not necessarily have the same theoretical perspective. Gibson completed her dissertation on differentiation using behaviourist terminology. After a year at Yale, Gibson passed the required exams and moved back to Northampton, Massachusetts, where she continued to teach at Smith. She completed her dissertation two years later in 1938, at which point she received her doctorate from Yale.

== Academic career ==
Gibson began working at Smith College as an instructor in 1932. She took a year off in 1935 to pursue her Ph.D. at Yale University, before returning as an instructor at Smith College. In 1940, Gibson became an assistant professor at Smith. In 1941, James Gibson was requested to conduct perception research in the Flying Training Command of the United States Air Force at which point the family moved to Fort Worth, Texas. After a period of time, they moved to Santa Ana, California. After World War II ended, they moved back to Northampton, Massachusetts. Gibson resumed her position at Smith College in 1946.

In 1949, James Gibson took a job at Cornell University, requiring that the family move to Ithaca, New York. Gibson was unable to obtain a job at Cornell due to anti-nepotism policies prohibiting her from working in the same department as her husband. Thus, Gibson became an unpaid research associate. She continued her research by reaching out to other Cornell faculty, working alongside Howard Liddell, a professor in psychology. Gibson worked in Liddell's Behaviour Farm Laboratory, giving her experience working with and rearing baby animals. Gibson's interest in development grew after working with the animals. Liddell's Behaviour Farm is where the discovery of the behaviour that led to the Visual Cliff took place. After conducting research there for two years, Gibson left the Behaviour Farm upon finding out that her control group of goats was given away. Later, Gibson received funding from the United States Air Force and grants from the United States Navy to work on perceptual learning. In order to further explore this topic, Gibson and her husband, James, co-authored a study on the perception of nonsense scribbles, eventually leading to the differentiation theory. Additionally, when Richard Walk was hired at Cornell University, Gibson and Walk decided to explore discrimination learning on rats who were raised in different environments, eventually leading to the Visual Cliff experiment. Their work together ended when Walk left Cornell University to pursue work at George Washington University.

In 1966, James took a job elsewhere and was no longer employed by Cornell University. With anti-nepotism policies no longer an issue, Gibson became a professor at Cornell with tenure. After her academic partnership with Walk ended, Gibson was asked to join an interdisciplinary project with the goal of achieving a better understanding of the reading processes.

In 1972, Gibson became the Susan Linn Sage Professor of Psychology and was given her own lab. At this point, Gibson turned her focus to perception in infants and turned her new lab into an infant perception lab.

In 1979, Gibson was forced to retire from her faculty position, the same year that her husband, James, passed away. Prior to her retirement, she began visiting other universities, and continued to do so for many years afterwards. Gibson continued to work in her lab until 1987, at which point she moved to Middlebury, Vermont, to live closer to her daughter.

=== Zeitgeist (Spirit of the Times) ===
Eleanor Gibson lived through the period of the Great Depression and when gender discrimination was considered the norm. The time and social norms influenced her career. Gibson attended Smith College to complete her B.A. degree and M.S. degree. Smith College, at the time, provided Gibson the opportunity to be in an atmosphere that challenged and encouraged women to be scholars and scientists. Living through the Great Depression impacted her in a way where, due to financial issues and marriage, she could not begin her Ph.D. program until years later. She stayed as an instructor at Smith College for two years teaching labs before she set off to Yale University to obtain her Ph.D.

In the spirit of the times, Yale University, unlike Smith College, did not support women's careers. Yale University did not provide financial assistance toward Gibson's post-secondary studies. Smith College awarded Gibson with a scholarship to continue her studies at Yale University, covering her tuition. Eleanor Gibson had strong interests in comparative psychology. Her interests led her to approach Robert Yerkes as her dissertation advisor. As gender discrimination was the norm, Yerks initially dismissed Gibson. Yerkes did not allow women to work in his laboratory. Gibson faced many gender barriers but sought alternatives to complete her goals. Gibson successfully completed her studies at Yale University, earning her Ph.D. in 1938.

Gibson's academic career was disrupted due to the war and after the attack on Pearl Harbor in 1941. She accompanied her husband, James Gibson, to Texas and later California as he conducted research in the Flying Training Command of the Army Air Force. Eleanor Gibson continued her academic career at Smith College as a teacher after a 4-year hiatus.

In 1949, Gibson and her husband left Smith College and moved to Cornell University. Cornell, at the time, did not hire women as part of their faculty. Cornell also had an anti-nepotism rule that did not allow her to work as a faculty member because her husband, James Gibson, had already been hired into their Psychology department. Gibson would work as a research associate for 16 years, unpaid. Gibson continued her research whilst facing gender discrimination and anti-nepotism rules.

== Personal life ==
Gibson met her husband, James Gibson, at the end of her junior year at Smith while attending a graduation garden party. James was an assistant professor, and the day after meeting James, Gibson changed her schedule to include James’ advanced experimental psychology course. They married in September 1932. Their first child, James J. Gibson, Junior, was born in 1940. Their second child, Jean Gibson, was born in 1943. Gibson decided to take a break from research for a few years in order to focus on her children and teaching.

== Death ==
In Eleanor Gibson's final years she was focused on writing and publishing books. Her goal was to illustrate her progression of thinking. Her book titled, "An Odyssey in Learning and Perception" is a collection of her academic papers starting from the 1930s. The book encompasses her 50 years of work toward perceptual learning and development.

In 2002, before her death, Gibson published a final book. Her final book was initially written as a personal family history but later evolved into a story about the lives of two psychologists. She titled her final book: "Perceiving the affordances: A portrait of two psychologists." Gibson died on December 30, 2002, in Columbia, South Carolina.

== Legacy ==
=== Perceptual learning ===
Gibson was highly influenced by the work of her husband, James Gibson. Together they developed the Gibsonian ecological theory of development. This theory influenced her research on perceptual learning.

Gibson believed that a radically different new view of perceptual learning was needed. One of her major studies involved the steps to how children perceive their environment. Gibson and her husband argued that the aspect of learning is to strengthen your insight or perception of the environment. This process of perceptual learning was deemed a part of differentiation by Gibson and her husband. Humans first have the tendency to categorize everything that appears similar into groups. In other words, people tend to overgeneralize. With perceptual learning, humans can battle the tendency to overgeneralize by learning to make appropriate distinctions, such as the specific patterns and properties of different stimulus. An example Gibson and her husband used to describe this is that someone who regularly participates in wine tasting can taste the differences in many wines. However, someone participating for the very first time might think many if not all wines taste the same.

Gibson worked with her husband James on a joint study to explore the perception of nonsense scribbles to clarify this concept of perceptual learning. The study consisted of three different groups. The first group had ten participants between 6- and 8-year-olds. The second group had ten participants between 8½- and 11-year-olds. The third group had twelve participants that were adults.

The participants were tasked to identify one standard scribble from a set of similar scribbles varying in many different dimensions. The scribbles contained coils ranging from three to five and they were different in lengths. Some coils spiral clockwise while other coils spiral counter-clockwise. The experiment had a deck of cards with a different scribble on each card. Also included within the deck were various cards printed with other figures. The participants were given a target to look at for around 5s. They were informed that some of the cards had coils printed on them that are identical to the target. Next, each card was presented to the participant for about 3s. They were tasked in choosing the cards that were identical to the target. In the first trial, the deck of cards consist of 17 scribbles that were similar to the target and 12 other prints that were all very different from both the target and each other.

Results showed that three groups learned to identify and differentiate items at various levels and various rates. In the first trial, the group with the youngest participants were able to identify most of the scribbles identical to the target, an average of 13.4. This was followed by the group with the older children who identified more than the third group, an average of 7.9. The group consisting of adults identified the least identical items, an average of 3.0. However, results also indicated that the group of adults were able to achieve perfect identification within an average of 3.1 trials, while the group of older kids achieved it within an average of 4.7 trials. On the contrary, many of the young children in the first group failed to match any correct coil to the target. The number of trials needed to achieve perfect identification could not be achieved within the duration of the study.

At first the standard scribble was imperceptible from the other scribbles but after repeated tests the standard scribble became clear. The participants were tested until the standard was identified correctly without any correction given. The Gibson's then stated that the stimulus held all the information for perception rather than the participants learning to perceive through an associative process. This resulted in perceptual learning as being redefined as a change in what was perceived by an observer became more sensitive to the different aspects of a stimulus. At the beginning of the study, many of the stimuli or coil, appear to look identical. But with practice, the participants learn to tell the stimuli apart from one another. The process of perceptual learning occurs faster over time through repetition.

Gibson states that differentiation is a crucial aspect to both evolutionary psychology and developmental psychology. Perceptual learning allow humans to respond differently yet appropriately to the stimuli in their environment. Gibson said that the links between the perceiver and their environment is the domain for where perceptual development occurs. She states that a person has only achieved perceptual learning of specificity if they can differentiate one object from another and if they can identify the properties of that object.

Another study Gibson did in perceptual learning is the perception of words and spelling patterns. Learning to read is a crucial aspect in child development and is complicated as words can have different meanings when perceived by the reader. Gibson was interested in factors enabling a reader to reach the stage where they can instantly tell words apart. Gibson argues that pronounceability has an impact in reading as certain combinations of the alphabet are easier to pronounce than others. Certain letters pair well in certain positions in words which allows for easier perception. According to Gibson, these particular spelling patterns are pronounced the same. For example, the positions of the letters "glurck" is pronounceable despite it not being an English word. On the other hand, the positions of "ckurgl" is not as easy to pronounce. A person fluent in English may notice that the letters "gl" is the start of many words while "ck" is at the end of many words. Such spelling patterns in words allow a reader to easily perceive the words to pronounce.

==== Differentiation theory ====
Within her research on perceptual learning, Eleanor Gibson was particularly interested in, what she termed, the differentiation theory. The differentiation theory states that in the information received from sensory stimulation, individuals discriminate objects in the environment and experiences by identifying unique characteristics about them, termed distinctive features.

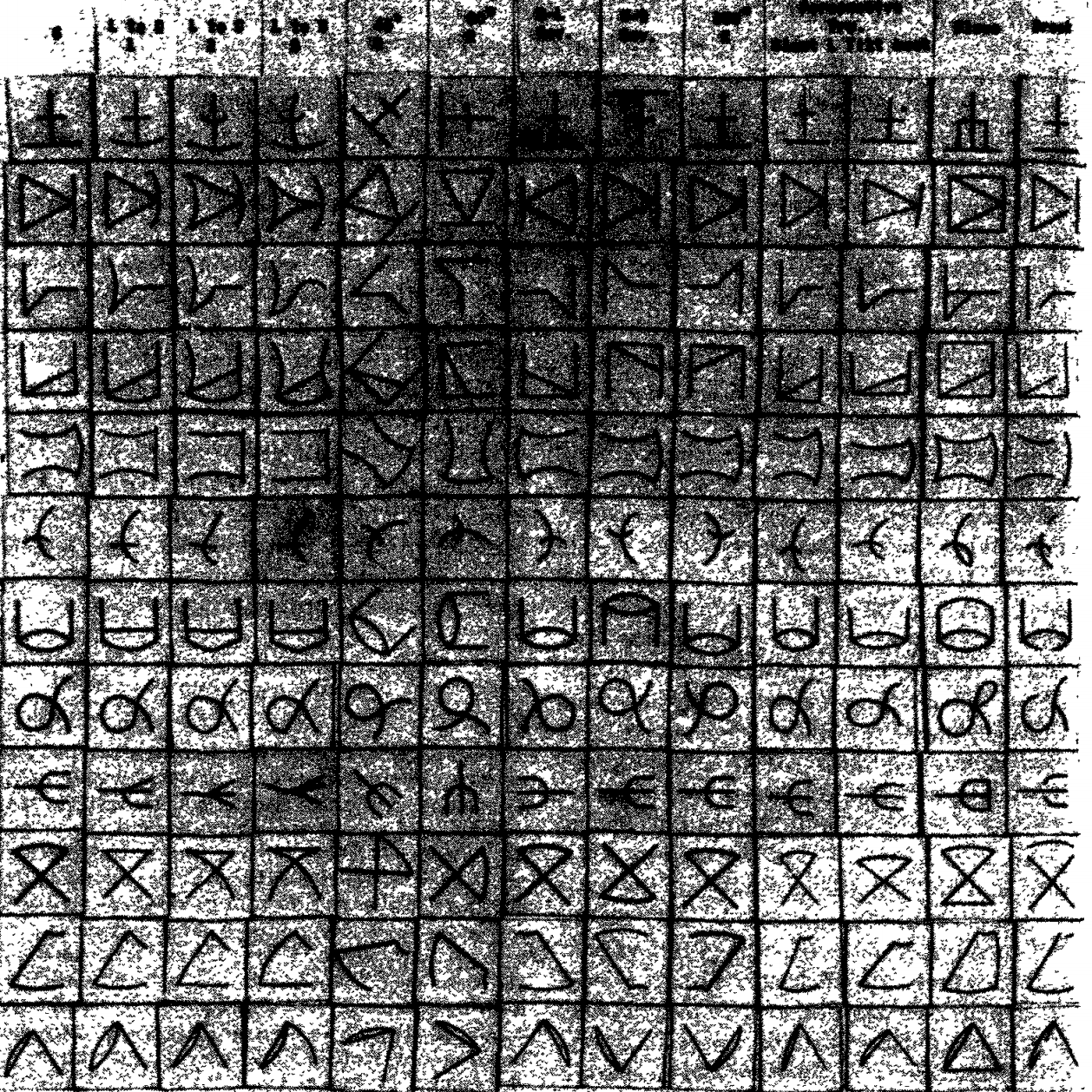
Eleanor Gibson 1962 letter-like forms study - standard forms and transformations

Eleanor Gibson performed a study to examine how young children discriminate between different "letter-like forms". The children used in the study were between ages 4 and 8 years old. The children were given 13 standard letter-like forms in a column on the left-hand side of the page to examine. Several variations in each letter-like form, termed transformations, were given along the rows. The transformations were either slight changes in appearance by altering the lines in the form ("topological transformation" and "line-to-curve transformation") or a change in the perspective of the letter ("rotational-reversal transformation" and "perspective transformation") while keeping the form identical. The task given to the children was to determine and indicate which transformations were no different from the standard forms. Overall, as age increased, the amount of incorrect differentiations made decreased. However, this varied depending on the level of difficulty of the transformations. The results demonstrated that the 4 to 5 year olds had great difficulties with all variations of the forms whereas the 6 to 8 year olds performed much better and were able to discriminate between the standard letter-like forms and the variations shown. The following list is ordered from the transformations that had the largest decrease in errors (largest improvement) to the smallest (least improvement), as age increased: rotational-reversal, line-to-curve, perspective, topological. These results contribute to the research on perceptual learning in that they suggest that children learn distinctive characteristics to be used for differentiation which is a large component of the identification of letters.

=== Visual cliff ===
Eleanor had been studying the development and process of imprinting in goats when the inspiration for the visual cliff was spontaneously discovered. While washing one of the baby goats, another was about to be born. Acting quickly, she placed the goat on an object elevated off the ground. The newborn did not move from where she placed it, giving some indication of depth perception.

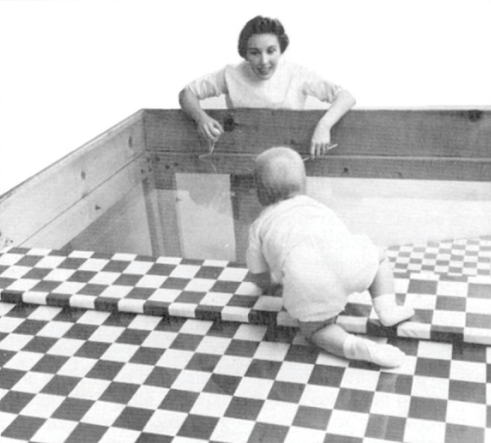
Visual cliff used with human infants

At the time the visual cliff study had initially been designed, Gibson had been researching with a professor at Cornell, Richard Walk. Walk & Gibson were examining the development of rats and how this was influenced by their rearing environments. Walk & Gibson included dark-reared rats in their experiment, whose raising was extremely time-consuming. A combination of 1) wanting to get the most use out of the rats along with, 2) inspiration from both Eleanor's experience with the goats and a similar previous experiment done by Lashley & Russell in 1934, produced the idea of studying depth perception with the visual cliff.

Walk & Gibson studied visual depth perception in rats, chickens, turtles, lambs, baby goats, pigs, dogs, cats, and monkeys. In the original study with rats, the apparatus was made of two sheets of glass standing "parallel to the floor and 53 inches above it" with a thin board along the middle. The rats were either placed into the experimental group with the shallow and deep side or a control group having no deep side, only shallow. The results of the study demonstrated that the rats in the experimental group spent the majority of their time on the shallow side while the rats in the control condition did not show a preference. A follow-up study was then conducted with an apparatus having both deep sides with no shallow, along with the same control condition. The results of the follow-up study demonstrated that majority of the rats stayed on the center board and those that did not took longer to walk onto the glass than did rats in the control condition. Gibson then used a larger apparatus to test chickens, turtles, lambs, kids (baby goats), pigs, dogs, cats, and monkeys; all showing similar results.

Walk & Gibson further experimented with dark-reared vs. light-reared rats to determine whether the depth perception found previously was innate. The results were similar. This indicated the possibility that depth perception was inherent in all animals. However, when tested with cats, this result was not found. This demonstrated the belief that depth perception is innate in some species while in others (such as cats), they must learn depth perception.

Finally, Walk & Gibson examined visual depth perception in human infants with a larger apparatus. The infants ranged from 6 months old to 14 months old. Each child was placed on the center board with his or her mother standing on either the shallow side or the deep side, attempting to motivate the child to crawl toward the mother. The results demonstrated that the majority (approximately 90%) of the infants would crawl onto the shallow side but only approximately 10% would crawl onto the deep side. It was observed that the infants who refused to crawl onto the deep side would either crawl away from their mother when she was standing on that side or would cry. These results suggest that "the average human infant discriminates depth as soon as it can crawl."

== Accolades ==
Throughout Gibson's lifetime, she received the following awards.

- APA Award for Distinguished Scientific Contributions to Psychology (1968)
- The G. Stanley Hall Award for Distinguished Contribution to Developmental Psychology (1970)
- Elected to the National Academy of Sciences (1971)
- Elected to the National Academy of Education (1972)
- Yale University's Wilbur Cross Medal (1973)
- Elected to the American Academy of Arts and Sciences (1977)
- Howard C. Warren Medal from the Society of Experimental Psychologists (1977)
- The Distinguished Scientific Contribution Award from the Society for Research in Child Development (1981)
- The American Psychological Foundation Gold Medal Award for Life Achievement in Science (1986)
- The National Medal of Science (1992)
- In addition, she received 11 honorary degrees, including degrees from Smith College in 1972 and Yale University in 1996.

Just a couple years following her Visual Cliff Study, on behalf of the chairman and Committee on Scientific Awards, George Armitage Miller, presented Gibson an APA Award for Distinguished Scientific Contributions. At the annual convention, she was recognized for her exceptional studies in perceptual learning and development. Along with James Birren and Muzafer Sherif, they were each presented with a writing of their contributions to the field of scientific psychology, as well as a cheque for one thousand dollars. This was the start of her acknowledgement.

Following Gibson's retirement in 1979, she continued her involvement through research and faculty appointments at institutions across the world including the University of Minnesota, University of South Carolina, Indiana University, University of Connecticut, Emory University, and the University of Beijing.

During the annual meeting of the APA in Washington, D.C., it was announced that Eleanor Gibson was the recipient of the Psychological Science Gold Medal Award. The Gold Medal Awards were given to American psychologists over the age of 65, whom resided in North America. Gibson was recognized for her distinguished and lifelong record of accomplishments in the areas of professional, scientific, and public interest, which ultimately landed her a golden medallion and a cheque for two thousand dollars. With her scientific findings, they continues to advance the knowledge of perception to this day.

Gibson was among ten psychologists who received the National Medal of Science which was presented by the president, George H. W. Bush in 1992. After 30 years of establishment, the National Medal of Science had been awarded to 304 receivers where Gibson was one of the ten psychologists that received it. Gibson will be remembered for her Visual Cliff Study, which is currently being taught in undergraduate programs.

=== Commemoration ===
At the age of 92, Gibson died on December 30, 2002. She was an experimental psychologist who significantly contributed to the many fields of psychology including perception, infant development, and reading. In 1949, she worked as a researcher in the department of psychology at Cornell University. Gibson was then appointed professor in 1966, where she became the first woman to hold an endowed professorship at Cornell. Six years later, she was named the Susan Linn Sage Professor of Psychology.

Gibson not only left an impact on the field of psychology but also an impact on the people she interacted with. Arlene Walker-Andrews, an associate provost and emeritus professor of psychology at the University of Montana, was one of Gibson's students at Cornell. Gibson provided her with an opportunity to be a part of her research one month into the school year. Arlene was part of a team of graduate researchers, whom were all brand new students but Jackie never failed to give them full credit. Arlene viewed her as a "gifted mentor" and spoke on her generosity, flexibility, and willingness. She never undervalued the graduate students and always treated them like independent scholars. In appreciation of Gibson, Arlene noted that she was an outstanding model with her work ethic, determination, raw intellect, and dedication to the growth and development of students.

== Published works ==
Eleanor Gibson published two major influential books, expanding the literature of learning in the psychological field. Her two books included: Principles of Perceptual Learning and Development and The Psychology of Reading.

In her lifetime, Gibson published several academic works.

- Gibson, E. J. (1939). Sensory generalization with voluntary reactions. Journal of Experimental Psychology, 24, 237–253. doi:10.1037/h0062877
- Gibson, E. J. (1940). A systematic application of the concepts of generalization and differentiation to verbal learning. Psychological Review, 47(3), 196–229. doi:10.1037/h0060582
- Gibson, E. J. (1941). Retroactive inhibition as a function of degree of generalization between tasks. Journal of Experimental Psychology, 28(2), 93–115. doi:10.1037/h0056366
- Gibson, E. J. (1942). Intra-list generalization as a factor in verbal learning. Journal of Experimental Psychology, 30(3), 185–200. doi:10.1037/h0058505
- Gibson, E. J. (1952). The role of shock in reinforcement. Journal of Comparative and Physiological Psychology, 45(1), 18–30. doi:10.1037/h0057667
- Gibson, E. J. (1969). Principles of perceptual learning and development. New York: Appleton-Century-Crofts.
- Gibson, E. J. (1980). Eleanor J. Gibson. In G. Lindzey (Ed.), A history of psychology in autobiography (Vol. 7, pp. 239–271). San Francisco, CA: W H Freeman & Co.
- Gibson, E. J. (1988). Exploratory behaviour in the development of perceiving, acting, and the acquiring of knowledge. In Rosenzweig, M. R., Porter, L. W. (Eds.), Annual Review of Psychology (Vol. 39, pp. 1–41). Palo Alto, CA: Annual Reviews.
- Gibson, E. J. (1991). An odyssey in learning and perception. Cambridge, MA: MIT Press.
- Gibson, E. J. (1994). Has psychology a future? Psychological Science, 5, 69–76. doi:10.1111/j.1467-9280.1994.tb00633.x
- Gibson, E. J. (2002). Perceiving the affordances: A portrait of two psychologists. Mahwah, NJ: Erlbaum.
