= Naomi Norsworthy =

American psychologist

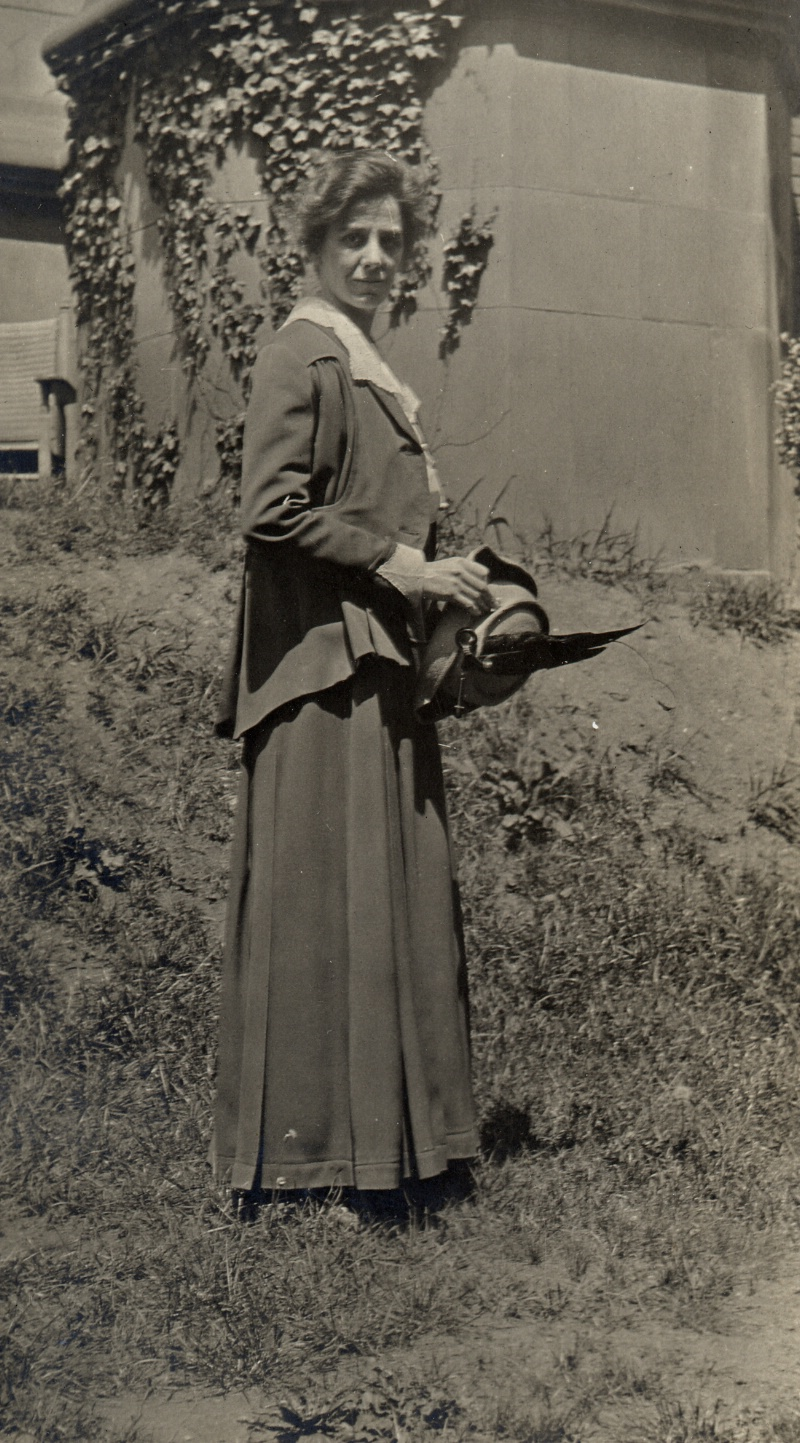
- Naomi Norsworthy in 1915
- Born: September 29, 1877; New York City, U.S.
- Died: December 27, 1916 (aged 39); New York City, U.S.
- Education: Columbia Teacher's College
- Occupation: Psychologist
- Notable work: The psychology of mentally deficient children (1904); The psychology of childhood (1918)

Naomi Norsworthy (September 29, 1877 – December 27, 1916) was an American psychologist who served as the first female faculty member at Columbia University Teacher's College. Her parents had emigrated from England two years before her birth. Norsworthy was the eldest of four children with two younger brothers and a third who died soon after birth. She was educated in public school in Rutherford, New Jersey then enrolled in New Jersey State Normal School at the age of 15, and was among the youngest students there; she graduated from the school in three years.

After spending four years teaching public school in Morristown, New Jersey, Norsworthy enrolled in Columbia University's Teachers College, and served as student assistant in the Psychology department She obtained her Bachelor's of Science Degree in 1901 and her PhD in 1904. Her doctoral thesis, The psychology of mentally deficient children, studied 150 children in state institutions throughout New York; she brought her findings to the American Psychological Association, which marked the first time a woman had presented a thesis in the Association's New York center. After graduating, she served in the faculty of the Teacher's College, remaining there for the rest of her life despite actively receiving offers from other universities.

Norsworthy served as instructor from 1904 to 1909, then her title changed to adjunct professor. Alongside working, she also took care of her mother who was suffering from terminal cancer until her death in 1914. Shortly before her mother's death, Norsworthy was diagnosed with stomach cancer. She continued to teach until 1916, when she was forced to take a leave of absence; she died in December of that year. Her primary work, The psychology of childhood, was completed by her colleagues after her death and released in 1918.
