= Howard C. Warren =

American psychologist

Howard C Warren
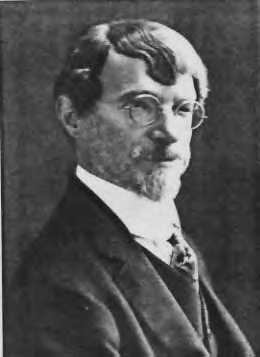
- Howard C. Warren
- Born: 1867
- Died: 1934
- Scientific career
- Fields: Psychology

Howard Crosby Warren (1867 – 1934) was an American psychologist and the first chairman of the Princeton University Psychology department. He was also president of the American Psychological Association in 1913.

The Society of Experimental Psychologists awards the Howard Crosby Warren Medal each year in his honor.

== Early life and education ==
Howard Crosby Warren was born in Montclair, New Jersey. His parents were Dorman T. Warren and Harriet Crosby Warren.

Warren graduated from Princeton in 1889, and received his A.M. in 1891. Starting in 1891, he studied abroad at the universities in Leipzig, Berlin and Munich, but left by 1892 to help establish a psychological laboratory at Princeton University with James Mark Baldwin.

He was made assistant professor at Princeton in 1896, and Professor of Experimental Psychology in 1902.

== Professional career ==
Having become professor in 1902 Warren went on to be appointed director of the Nassau Hall laboratory in 1904, the Stuart Professor of Psychology in 1914, and in 1920 the first head of the Princeton Psychology Department. He is noted as having been a major contributor to the erection of the Eno Hall built in 1924. He was also co-editor of Psychological Review with James Mark Baldwin from 1904-1908

== Commemoration ==
Howard C. Warren is today commemorated by the Society of Experimental Psychologists, which he helped found, and who annually awards to one of its members the Howard Crosby Warren Medal. At Princeton his private psychological library is housed in the Green Halls, which replaced Eno Hall as the home of psychology in 1963.

== Bibliography ==
- "Introduction to Psychology" (1911) — article published in Science
- Human Psychology (1920)
- A History of the Association Psychology (1921)
- Elements of Human Psychology (1922)
- Dictionary of Psychology (1935)
