= Susan Krauss Whitbourne =

American psychologist

- Occupation: Professor of Psychology
- Awards: Presidential Citation (2011); Distinguished Membership Award from Psi Chi (2018)

Academic background
- Education: University at Buffalo; Columbia University

Academic work
- Institutions: University of Massachusetts Amherst

Susan Krauss Whitbourne (born 1948) is a developmental clinical psychologist known for her work on personality and identity over the lifespan. She holds the position of professor emerita of psychology at the University of Massachusetts Amherst.

Whitbourne served as president of the Eastern Psychological Association from 2017 to 2018 and as president of the American Psychological Association, Division 20, Adult Development and Aging from 1995 to 1996.

She received an APA Presidential Citation in 2011 and was awarded the Distinguished Membership Award from Psi Chi, The International Honors Society in Psychology in 2018.

== Biography ==
Whitbourne was born on December 16, 1948, in Buffalo, New York. She received her bachelor's degree in psychology at the University at Buffalo in 1970 and her Ph.D. in clinical/developmental psychology at Columbia University in 1974. She subsequently finished a clinical psychology postdoctoral re-specialization program at the University of Massachusetts Amherst.

Whitbourne was an assistant professor at the State University of New York at Geneseo from 1973 to 1975. She was on the faculty of the University of Rochester from 1976 to 1984, before moving to the University of Massachusetts Amherst. At Rochester, Whitbourne was involved in conducting the Rochester Adult Longitudinal Study––a 50-year, 4-cohort, 1200 participant, 5-wave sequential study of Eriksonian psychosocial development in adulthood.

Whitbourne has served as a columnist and/or consultant for multiple popular media outlets, including HuffPost, Psychology Today, Reason, CapRadio, Cosmopolitan, Today's Parent, and more.

== Research ==
Whitbourne's research program has examined a variety of issues related to people's experiences of identity over the lifespan. Topics include identity and self-consciousness in middle and later adulthood the connection between national, ethnic, and personal identity in a multiethnic sample of young adults, and the theoretical and methodological challenges associated with studying identity processing in adulthood. Whitbourne and her colleagues have conducted research to evaluate the theory that older people experience physical, psychological, and social role changes that threaten their sense of self and ability to live happily, as well as being bombarded with negative ageist stereotypes. She has used a variety of methodologies to examine ageism in society, including a study of ageist stereotypes in undergraduate psychology textbooks.

== Books ==
- Cavanaugh, J.C. & Whitbourne, S.K. (1999). Gerontology: An interdisciplinary perspective. Oxford University Press.
- Halgin, R.P. & Whitbourne, S.K. (2000). Abnormal psychology: Clinical perspectives on psychological disorders (3rd Ed.). McGraw-Hill.
- Whitbourne, S. K. (1985). The aging body: Physiological changes and psychological consequences. Springer-Verlag.
- Whitbourne, S. K. (1986). The me I know: A study of adult identity. Springer-Verlag.
- Whitbourne, S.K. (2008). Adult development and aging: Biopsychosocial perspectives (3rd Ed.). Wiley.
- Whitbourne, S. K. (2010). The search for fulfillment. Ballantine Books.
- Whitbourne, S. K. & Ebmeyer, J. B. (1990). Identity and intimacy in marriage: A study of couples. Springer-Verlag.
- Whitbourne, S.K. & Willis, S.L. (2006). The baby boomers grow up: Contemporary perspectives on midlife. Erlbaum.
- Whitbourne, S.K. & Cavanaugh, J.C. (2003). Integrating aging topics into psychology: A practical guide for teaching undergraduates. American Psychological Association.

== Representative publications ==
- Rodriguez, L., Schwartz, S. J., & Whitbourne, S. K. (2010). American identity revisited: The relation between national, ethnic, and personal identity in a multiethnic sample of emerging adults. Journal of Adolescent Research, 25(2), 324–349.
- Sneed, J. R., & Whitbourne, S. K. (2003). Identity processing and self-consciousness in middle and later adulthood. The Journals of Gerontology Series B: Psychological Sciences and Social Sciences, 58(6), P313-P319.
- Sneed, J. R., & Whitbourne, S. K. (2005). Models of the aging self. Journal of Social Issues, 61(2), 375–388.
- Whitbourne, S. K., & Hulicka, I. M. (1990). Ageism in undergraduate psychology texts. American Psychologist, 45(10), 1127–1136.
- Whitbourne, S. K., Sneed, J. R., & Skultety, K. M. (2002). Identity processes in adulthood: Theoretical and methodological challenges. Identity: An International Journal of Theory and Research, 2(1), 29–45.
