= Herbert Langfeld =

American psychologist (1879–1958)

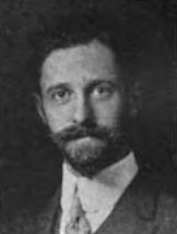
- Born: July 24, 1879; Philadelphia, Pennsylvania, US
- Died: February 25, 1958 (aged 78); Princeton, New Jersey, US
- Known for: Past president, American Psychological Association
- Scientific career
- Fields: Psychology
- Workplaces: Harvard University; Princeton University
- Thesis: Über die heterochrome Helligkeitsvergleichung (1909)
- Doctoral advisor: Carl Stumpf
- Doctoral students: James J. Gibson

Herbert Sidney Langfeld (July 24, 1879 – February 25, 1958) was an American psychologist and a past president of the American Psychological Association (APA).

== Biography ==
Herbert Langfeld was born in Philadelphia on July 24, 1879. He grew up in Philadelphia and was initially drawn to a diplomatic career. He was working for the American Embassy in Berlin when he was attracted to psychology. He earned a PhD in 1909 at the University of Berlin. He took a faculty position at Harvard University and ultimately went to Princeton University, where he became the psychological laboratory director and later the department chair for psychology. While at Princeton he also directly influenced the ecological psychology approach of J. J. Gibson through his phenomenological ideas.

Langfeld was APA president in 1930. He also held leadership positions with the International Congress of Psychology and the Psychology Section of the American Association for the Advancement of Science.

He died from heart disease in Princeton, New Jersey on February 25, 1958.
