= Visual cliff =

Apparatus used to test depth perception in babies

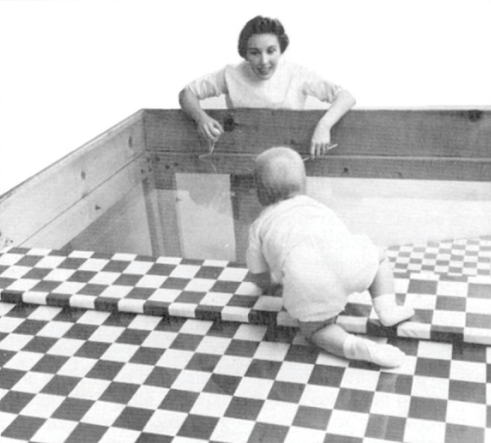
This mother is encouraging her child to crawl across the visual cliff. Despite a physical surface covering the cliff, the child hesitates to move forward.

The visual cliff is an apparatus created by psychologists Eleanor J. Gibson and Richard D. Walk at Cornell University to investigate depth perception in human and other animal species. It consists of a sturdy surface that is flat but has the appearance of a several-foot drop part-way across. The visual cliff apparatus allowed them to conduct an experiment in which the optical and tactile stimuli associated with a simulated cliff were adjusted while protecting the subjects from injury.

Using a visual cliff apparatus, Gibson and Walk examined possible perceptual differences at crawling age between human infants born preterm and human infants born at term without documented visual or motor impairments.

== Design ==
The visual cliff consisted of a sheet of Plexiglas that covers a cloth with a high-contrast checkerboard pattern. On one side the cloth is placed immediately beneath the Plexiglas, and on the other it is dropped about four feet (1.2 m) below.

== Original study ==
Gibson and Walk (1960) hypothesized that depth perception is inherent as opposed to a learned process. To test this, they placed 36 infants, six to fourteen months of age, on the shallow side of the visual cliff apparatus. Once the infant was placed on the opaque end of the platform, the caregiver (typically a parent) stood on the other side of the transparent plexiglas, calling out for them to come or holding an enticing stimulus such as a toy. This gave the infant the motivation to crawl across towards them. It was assumed if the child was reluctant to crawl to their caregiver, he or she was able to perceive depth, believing that the transparent space was an actual cliff. The researchers found that 27 of the infants crawled over to their mother on the "shallow" side without any problems. A few of the infants crawled but were extremely hesitant. Some infants refused to crawl because they were confused about the perceived drop between them and their mothers. The infants knew the glass was solid by patting it, but still did not cross. In this experiment, all of the babies relied on their vision in order to navigate across the apparatus. This shows that when healthy infants are able to crawl, they can perceive depth. However, results do not indicate that avoidance of cliffs and fear of heights is innate.

== Infant studies ==
During early development, infants begin to crawl, sit, and walk. These actions impact how the infants view depth perception. Thus, infant studies are an important part of the visual cliff. When an infant starts to engage in crawling, to sit, or walking, they use perception and action. During this time, infants begin to develop a fear of height. The everyday exploration of infants gives them clues about things or objects to avoid when exploring. Other research that has used the visual cliff focuses on preterm infants, prelocomotor Infants, and maternal signaling.

=== Preterm infants ===
Sixteen infants born at term and sixteen born preterm were encouraged to crawl to their caregivers on a modified visual cliff. Successful trials, crossing time, duration of visual attention, duration of tactile exploration, motor strategies, and avoidance behaviors were analyzed. A significant surface effect was found, with longer crossing times and longer durations of visual attention and tactile exploration in the condition with the visual appearance of a deep cliff. Although the two groups of infants did not differ on any of the timed measurements, infants born at term demonstrated a larger number of motor strategies and avoidance behaviors by simple tally. This study indicates that infants born at term and those born preterm can perceive a visual cliff and change their responses accordingly.

=== Prelocomotor infants ===
Another study measured the cardiac responses of human infants younger than crawling age on the visual cliff. This study found that the infants exhibited distress less frequently when they were placed on the shallow side of the apparatus in contrast to when they were placed on the deep side. This means that prelocomotor infants can discriminate between the two sides of the cliff.

=== Maternal signaling ===
James F Sorce et al. tested to see how maternal emotional signaling affected the behaviors of one-year-olds on the visual cliff. To do this they placed the infants on the shallow side of the visual cliff apparatus and had their mothers on the other side of the visual cliff eliciting different emotional facial expressions. When the mothers posed joy or interest most of the babies crossed the deep side but if the mothers posed fear or anger, most of the babies did not cross the apparatus.

In contrast, when the visual cliff effect was absent, most of the babies crossed regardless of the mother's facial expressions. This suggests that babies look to their mother's emotional expressions for advice most often when they are uncertain about the situation. Joseph J. Campos research focuses on facial expressions between the caregiver and infant. Specifically his research shows that the infants will not crawl if the caregiver expresses a signal of distress. If the caregiver gives the infant a positive facial expression the child is more likely to crawl across the visual cliff.

== Non-human experiments ==
Before Gibson and Walk conducted their study with human infants, multiple experiments were conducted using rats, one-day-old chicks, newborn kids, kittens, pigs, adult chickens, dogs, lambs, and monkeys. Overall, most species would avoid the deep side of the visual cliff, some right after being born. The first visual cliff experiment was conducted with rats who were raised in the dark and in the light. The results were that both groups of rats would walk all over the shallow and deep parts of the cliff without an issue, which surprised Gibson, Walk, and Thomas Tighe (a research assistant). A later experiment with kittens raised in the dark and then placed on the visual cliff showed that depth perception was not innate in all species as the kittens would walk on either side of the visual cliff. After six days of being in the light, the kittens would avoid the deep side of the visual cliff (Rodkey, 2015). Later researchers conducted experiments using other species.

=== Rats ===
Rats do not depend upon visual cues like some of the other species tested. Their nocturnal habits lead them to seek food largely by smell. When moving about in the dark, they respond to tactual cues from their stiff whiskers (vibrissae) located on the snout. Hooded rats tested on the visual cliff show little preference for either side of the visual cliff apparatus as long as they could feel the glass with their vibrissae. When placed upon the glass over the deep side, they move about as if there was no cliff.

=== Cats ===
Cats, like rats, are nocturnal animals, sensitive to tactual cues from their vibrissae. But the cat, as a predator, must rely more on its sight. Kittens were observed to have excellent depth-discrimination. At four weeks, the earliest age that a kitten can skillfully move about, they preferred the shallow side of the cliff. When placed on the glass over the deep side, they either freeze or circle backward until they reach the shallow side of the cliff.

=== Turtles ===
The late Robert M. Yerkes of Harvard University found in 1904 that aquatic turtles have somewhat worse depth-discrimination than land turtles. On the visual cliff one might expect an aquatic turtle to respond to the reflections from the glass as it might to water and prefer the deep side for this reason. They showed no such preference; 76% of the aquatic turtles crawled onto the shallow side. The large percentage that choose the deep side suggests either that this turtle has worse depth-discrimination than other animals, or that its natural habitat gives it less occasions to "fear" a fall.

=== Cows ===
The ability for cows to perceive a visual cliff was tested by NA Arnold et al. Twelve dairy heifers were exposed to a visual cliff in the form of a milking pit while walking through a milking facility. Over this five-day experiment the heifers' heart rates were measured along with the number of times they stopped throughout the milking facility. Dairy heifers in the experimental group were exposed to a visual cliff while dairy heifers in the control group were not. The experimental group was found to have significantly higher heart rates and stop more frequently than the heifers in the control group. Depth exposure did not have any effect on cortisol levels or the ease of handling of the animals. These findings provide evidence of both depth perception and acute fear of heights in cows. This may lead to a reorganization of the way milking factories function.

== Criticisms ==
One of the criticisms of the visual cliff study was whether the research in the study really supported the hypothesis that depth perception was innate in humans. One issue was about the glass over the deep part of the visual cliff. By covering up the deep side with glass the researchers enabled the babies to feel the solidity of the glass before they would cross over. This response was repeated over and over again in tests. Another criticism has to do with the experience of the infant. Infants who learned to crawl before 6.5 months of age had crossed the glass, but the ones that learned to crawl after 6.5 months of age avoided crossing the glass. This helps support the hypothesis that experience does influence avoidance of the glass, rather than just being innate.

== See also ==
- Developmental psychology
- Psychology
- Cognitive psychology
