= Society of Experimental Psychologists =

US academic society

The Society of Experimental Psychologists (SEP), originally called the Society of Experimentalists, is an academic society for experimental psychologists. It was founded by Edward Bradford Titchener in 1904 to be an ongoing workshop in which members could visit labs, study apparatus, and hear and comment on reports of ongoing research. Upon Titchener’s death in 1927 the club was reorganized and renamed the Society of Experimental Psychologists. The object of the society is “To advance psychology by arranging informal conferences on experimental psychology.”

== Activities ==
The SEP meets annually to conduct plenary sessions in which members can present papers. It holds meetings every spring, scheduled by a member at the host university who serves as the chair of the SEP for that year. The meetings are open to all members and to students and faculty from the host university who are invited by the chair.

Membership in the SEP is by invitation only and is considered to be a great honor because it represents significant accomplishment in the field of experimental psychology. The SEP currently admits at least 6 new members annually from among the leading experimentalists in North America. It has a current membership of 220 individuals, about 5 - 10% of the practicing experimental psychologists.

The SEP confers three awards:

- The Howard Crosby Warren Medal, endowed to recognize individuals who have made outstanding contributions to the field of experimental psychology during the previous five years.
- The Norman Anderson Lifetime Achievement Award, endowed to recognize individuals who have made outstanding contributions to the field of Experimental Psychology over the course of their lifetimes.
- The Early Investigator Award, created to recognize individuals who have made significant contributions to the field of experimental psychology early in their careers.
