= Huttenlocher =

Huttenlocher is a surname. Notable people with the surname include:

- Anna Huttenlocher, American rheumatologist and physician-scientist
- Britta Huttenlocher (born 1962), Swiss painter
- Daniel P. Huttenlocher (born 1959), American computer scientist
- Janellen Huttenlocher (1932–2016), American psychologist
- Peter Huttenlocher (1931–2013), American neurologist and neuroscientist
- Philippe Huttenlocher (born 1942), Swiss opera singer
