= William James Fellow Award =

The William James Fellow Award is an award of the Association for Psychological Science which "honors APS Members for their lifetime of significant intellectual contributions to the basic science of psychology". The requirement is that "recipients must be APS members recognized internationally for their outstanding contributions to scientific psychology". It is named after William James. As part of APS's 25th Anniversary, the APS Board of Directors recognized a larger class of William James Fellows in 2013, identifying them as individuals who have had a profound impact on the field of psychological science over the previous quarter century.

== Recipients ==
=== 1989 ===
- Robert P. Abelson
- Mary D. Ainsworth
- Solomon E. Asch
- John W. Atkinson
- Richard C. Atkinson
- Albert Bandura
- Roger G. Barker
- James E. Birren
- Gordon H. Bower
- John Bowlby
- Donald E. Broadbent
- Roger L. Brown
- Jerome S. Bruner
- Donald T. Campbell
- J. Douglas Carroll
- A. Noam Chomsky
- Lee J. Cronbach
- Morton Deutsch
- Russell L. De Valois
- Irving T. Diamond
- John H. Flavell
- John Garcia
- Wendell R. Garner
- Eleanor J. Gibson
- David M. Green
- Ernest R. Hilgard
- Julian Hochberg
- Leo Hurvich
- Dorothea Jameson
- Irving L. Janis
- Gunnar Johansson
- Edward E. Jones
- Jerome Kagan
- Daniel Kahneman
- Harold H. Kelley
- Beatrice T. Lacey
- John C. Lacey
- Richard S. Lazarus
- Alvin M. Liberman
- Donald B. Lindsley
- Frederic M. Lord
- R. Duncan Luce
- Eleanor E. Maccoby
- David C. McClelland
- James L. McGaugh
- William J. McGuire
- Paul Meehl
- George A. Miller
- Neal E. Miller
- Brenda Milner
- Walter Mischel
- Mortimer Mishkin
- Allen Newell
- Carl Pfaffmann
- Michael I. Posner
- Floyd Ratliff
- Robert A. Rescorla
- Lorrin A. Riggs
- Mark R. Rosenzweig
- Julian B. Rotter
- Stanley Schachter
- Roger N. Shepard
- Herbert A. Simon
- B.F. Skinner
- Richard L. Solomon
- George Sperling
- Roger W. Sperry
- Saul Sternberg
- Patrick Suppes
- Philip Teitelbaum
- Richard F. Thompson
- Ledyard R. Tucker
- Endel Tulving
- Amos Tversky
- Benton J. Underwood
- Hans Wallach
- Robert B. Zajonc

=== 1990 ===
- Frances K. Graham
- William K. Estes

=== 1991 ===
- Emanuel Donchin
- Martin E.P. Seligman

=== 1993 ===
- E. Mavis Hetherington
- Fergus I.M. Craik

=== 1994 ===
- Hans J. Eysenck
- Larry R. Squire

=== 1995 ===
- Harold W. Stevenson
- Jean J. Chapman
- Loren Chapman

=== 1996 ===
- Richard E. Nisbett
- William T. Greenough

=== 1997 ===
- Edward Taub
- Richard Davidson

=== 1998 ===
- Paul Ekman
- Rochel Gelman
- Timothy A. Salthouse

=== 1999 ===
- Edward E. Smith

=== 2000 ===
- E. Tory Higgins
- Elizabeth S. Spelke

=== 2001 ===
- Claude M. Steele
- Elizabeth F. Loftus
- Shelley E. Taylor

=== 2002 ===
- Anne M. Treisman
- Susan Carey

=== 2003-2004 ===
- Jay McClelland
- Lee D. Ross

=== 2004-2005 ===
- David Premack
- Robert Plomin

=== 2005-2006 ===
- Charles R. Gallistel
- Marcia K. Johnson

=== 2006-2007 ===
- Elliot Aronson
- Richard M. Shiffrin

=== 2007-2008 ===
- David E. Meyer
- Morris Moscovitch

=== 2008-2009 ===
- Martha Farah
- Susan T. Fiske

=== 2010 ===
- Philip N. Johnson-Laird
- Leslie Ungerleider

=== 2011 ===
- Nancy Eisenberg
- John Jonides
- Daniel M. Wegner

=== 2012 ===
- Ellen S. Berscheid
- Elaine C. Hatfield
- Henry L. Roediger III

=== 2013 ===
- John R. Anderson
- Linda Bartoshuk
- Roy F. Baumeister
- Marilynn B. Brewer
- Gerald L. Clore
- John M. Darley
- Judy DeLoache
- Ed Diener
- Uta Frith
- Anthony G. Greenwald
- Janellen Huttenlocher
- Larry L. Jacoby
- Patricia K. Kuhl
- Ellen Markman
- Bruce S. McEwen
- Douglas Medin
- Helen J. Neville
- Elissa L. Newport
- John A. Swets
- Allan R. Wagner

=== 2014 ===
- Robert W. Levenson
- Nora S. Newcombe
- Keith Rayner (psychologist)
- Terry E. Robinson

=== 2015 ===
- Michael S. Gazzaniga
- Susan Goldin-Meadow
- Joseph E. LeDoux
- Timothy D. Wilson

=== 2016 ===
- Mahzarin Banaji
- Richard Ivry
- Steven Pinker

=== 2017 ===
- Daniel Schacter
- Robert Sternberg

=== 2018 ===
- John T. Cacioppo
- Jonathan D. Cohen

=== 2019 ===
- Daniel T. Gilbert
- Lynn Nadel
- Elizabeth A. Phelps
- Janet F. Werker

=== 2020 ===
- Stephen P. Hinshaw
- Andrew N. Meltzoff
- Elissa L. Newport
- Lynn Nadel
- John O’Keefe

=== 2021 ===
- Lisa Feldman Barrett
- Megan R. Gunnar
- Henry L. Roediger

=== 2022 ===
- BJ Casey
- Susan A. Gelman
- Shinobu Kitayama

=== 2023 ===
- Michael S. Fanselow
- Vonnie McLoyd
- Jennifer A. Richeson

== See also ==
- List of psychology awards
