= Endel Aruja =

Estonian physicist (1911–2008)

Endel Aruja (5 July 1911 – 4 February 2008) was an Estonian physicist specialising in X-ray crystallography, encyclopedian, librarian, supporter of libraries and a long-term Estonian expatriate activist.

== Short biography ==
Aruja was born in Soontaga, Kreis Dorpat, in the Governorate of Livonia, and was initially schooled in his birthplace. For high school and later, university education, he moved to Tartu. After earning his M.Sc., he worked in 1938–1939 as a physics laboratory assistant in the Tallinn Technical University, then moved to England, where he received his PhD in 1943. In 1962, he moved to Canada.

== Education ==
In 1935, Aruja graduated from the Faculty of Mathematics and Natural Sciences at the University of Tartu.

In 1938, Aruja successfully defended his M.Sc. thesis.

In 1939, Aruja was granted a scholarship by the British Council and moved to Cambridge, England, where he received his PhD in physics from the Cambridge University in 1943.

== Estonian expatriate activism ==
Aruja participated in founding and running of a number of Estonian organisations in England: the London Estonian Society, which he chaired for six years, the Estonian Association of England and the London Estonian House. He was the vice chairman of the organising committee of the 1984 ESTO, which was held in Toronto.

Aruja was an active participant of the Baltic Estonian Council, the Baltic Humanitarian Association, the Estonian National Fund (Estonian: Eesti Rahvusfond) and the Estonian National Council, and he both edited and distributed periodical publications of these organisations. For this, he set up the publishing house Northern Publications. He's also written a number of Estonia-themed articles for the Encyclopædia Britannica, appearing among contributors of articles such as Estonia: Independence lost.

Most recently, Aruja was the first secretary of the Tartu Institute in Ontario, Canada from its founding in 1972 until 2004.

=== Book deliveries ===
Since 1986, Aruja had been organising supplies Estonian libraries with Estonian books published abroad. (The libraries had been unable such books during the Soviet occupation due to the Iron Curtain.) The first major shipment of 160 boxes, weighing about 5000 kg, arrived in 1989. Eventually, Aruja succeeded in delivering over 7000 boxes of books to various Estonian libraries, including all the major ones.

=== Collections ===
As an archivist and librarian, Aruja collected eight roomfuls, totalling about 236 square metres, worth of archival material, resulting in one of the most extensive cultural compendiums of Estonian expatriates.

== Awards ==
In 1990, Endel Aruja was awarded an honorary doctorate by the University of Tartu; in 1998, the President of Estonia recognised his work by an Order of the White Star of class V, in 2002, he was awarded a medal of service by the Tartu University Library, and in 2003, the corporation Rotalia awarded him an honorary colour band.

== Sources ==
- Baltic Heritage Network: Obituary. Dr Endel Aruja (5.07.1911-4.02.2008) by Piret Noorhani
- Universitas Tartuensis: Endel Aruja in memoriam
- eesti.ca: Dr. Endel Aruja — In Memoriam by Olev Träss
