= Larry L. Jacoby =

American cognitive psychologist

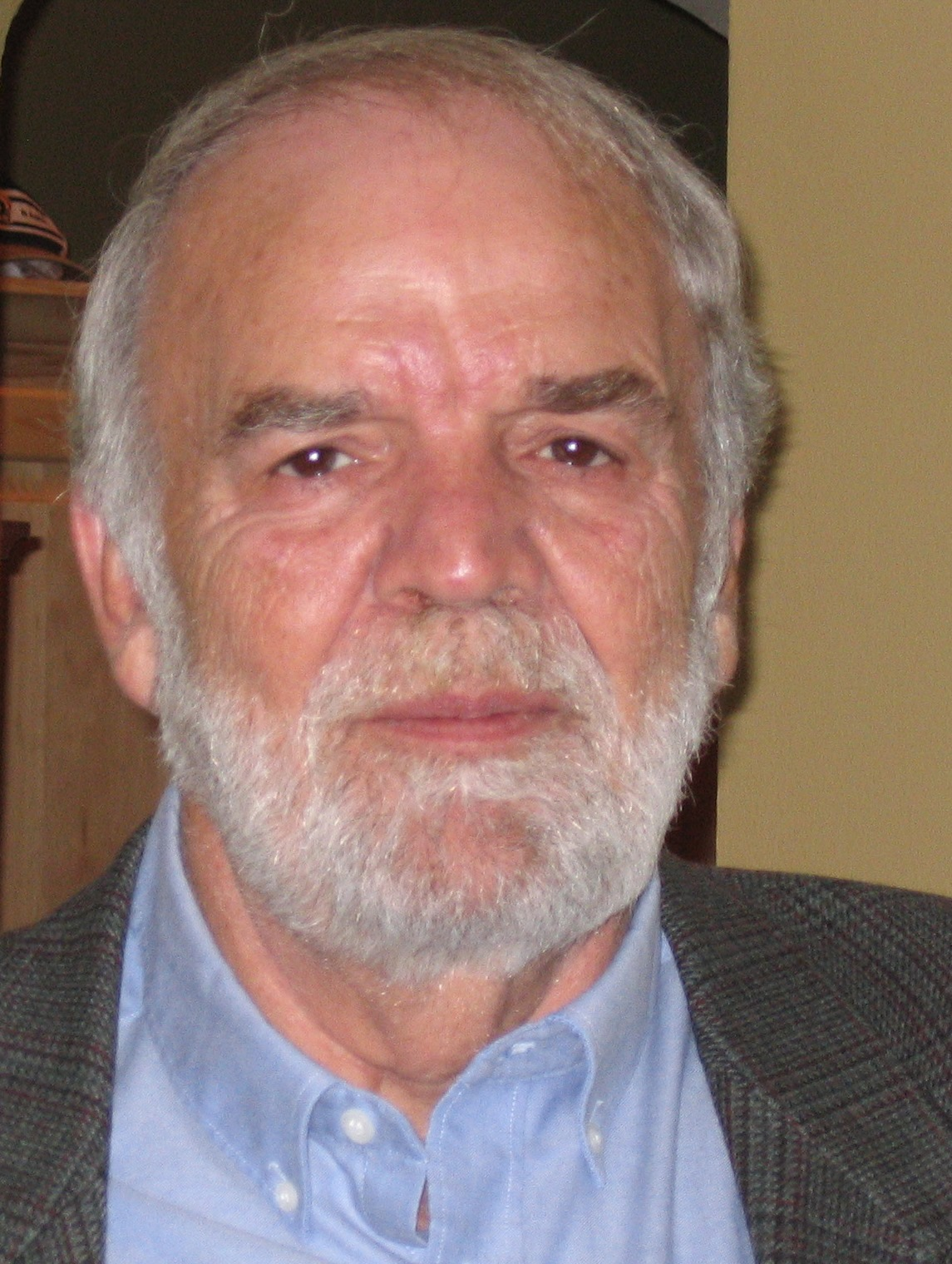
- Born: March 11, 1944
- Died: March 15, 2024 (aged 80)
- Education: Washburn University; Southern Illinois University
- Known for: Process dissociation
- Awards: William James Fellow Award, Norman Anderson Lifetime Achievement Award
- Scientific career
- Fields: Cognitive psychology
- Workplaces: Iowa State University; McMaster University; University of Toronto Mississauga; University of Utah; University of Texas at Austin; New York University; Washington University in St. Louis
- Doctoral advisor: Robert Radke
- Website: http://psych.wustl.edu/amcclab/AMCC%20Home.htm

Larry L. Jacoby (March 11, 1944–March 15, 2024) was an American cognitive psychologist specializing in research on human memory. He was particularly known for his work on the interplay of consciously controlled versus more automatic influences of memory.

== Evidence of impact ==
The Association for Psychological Science (APS) selected Jacoby as a 2013 winner of the William James Fellow Award for members "recognized internationally for their outstanding contributions to scientific psychology". In his profile in the APS journal, Observer, Jacoby is described as "one of the world's foremost researchers on memory". The Society of Experimental Psychologists awarded him the 2013 Norman Anderson Lifetime Achievement Award. Jacoby is on the Thomson Reuters list of highly cited researchers (an explicit definition of scholarly influence). From 1994 to 1995, Jacoby held an endowed position, the David Wechsler Chair at the University of Texas at Austin.

Harzing's Publish or Perish credits Jacoby with an h-index of 69 (86 as of 8.2019) and more than 23,000 citations (36223 as of 8.2019). PsycINFO lists 153 works by Jacoby. Jacoby's work also figures prominently in many undergraduate textbooks. The Oxford Handbook of Memory cites Jacoby's work on 73 different pages. Similarly, multiple citations of Jacoby's work appear in each of the three volumes of The Psychology of Memory. Jacoby has coauthored works with Dave Balota (Wash U), Lee Brooks (deceased; formerly at McMaster), Laird Cermak (deceased, formerly of Boston U), Fergus I. M. Craik (University of Toronto), Robyn Dawes (deceased; formerly at Carnegie-Mellon), John Dunlosky (Kent State), Mark McDaniel (Wash U.), and Daniel Schacter (Harvard). Jacoby's former students include Andrew Yonelinas, Diane St. Marie, Janine Jennings, Janine Hay, Jeffrey Toth, Karen Daniels, Matt Rhodes, and Stephen Lindsay, among others. Jacoby has long maintained a productive collaboration with Colleen M. Kelley.

== Pedigree/appointments ==
Jacoby earned his undergraduate degree at Washburn University, and his MA and PhD (in 1970) at Southern Illinois University under the supervision of Robert Radtke. His first academic post was at Iowa State University. He was on the faculty of McMaster University (Hamilton, Ontario, Canada) for many years, where he collaborated with colleagues Lee Brooks, Ian Begg, Betty Ann Levy, and Bruce Milliken and long-time research assistant Ann Hollingshead, and interacted with colleagues at the University of Toronto Mississauga including Fergus Craik, Gordon Logan, Morris Moscovitch, and Endel Tulving.

Jacoby spent a year or two at the University of Utah on leave from McMaster. Later, he held the David Wechsler Chair in the Department of Psychology at the University of Texas at Austin. He then moved to New York University for a couple of years, then returned briefly to McMaster, and then moved to Washington University in St. Louis, where Henry L. Roediger III assembled a world-class department of psychology. Jacoby continues to work at Wash U.

== Major contributions ==
Jacoby's work has to do with human memory, and most of it has emphasized episodic memory (that is, the processes and mechanisms that enable us to remember our own past experiences). His early work was in the verbal learning tradition. Jacoby's first publication, in a now-defunct publication of the Psychonomic Society, was McHose, Jacoby, and Meyer 1967. Jacoby published steadily throughout the 1970s, producing a number of works that have attracted multiple citations, such as a 1978 article on how, when a problem is repeated, a person may solve it by remembering the prior solution.

=== Attributional approach to remembering ===
In the 1980s, a major theme in Jacoby's work was that the feeling of remembering does not inhere in the use of memory traces. As he noted, one can use memory records of specific past episodes without having a subjective feeling of remembering (as in involuntary plagiarism) and one can have a subjective feeling of remembering without there being any directly corresponding prior episode and hence no directly corresponding memory trace (as in false-memory phenomena). Jacoby argued that the feeling of remembering arises when a person infers (usually very quickly and without conscious reflection) that current thoughts and images are based on memories of a prior episode – that is, when people attribute current mental events to the past. For a beautifully written and compelling synthesis of Jacoby's work on this perspective, see his 1989 chapter with Colleen Kelley and Jane Dywan in a book in honour of Endel Tulving coedited by Roediger and Craik. In his work with Kelley, he made a distinction between memory that influences performance (he called it "memory as a tool"), which is implicit or unconscious memory outside our awareness, and recollection memory (he called it "memory as an object"), which is conscious memory of an event.

=== Logic of opposition ===
Jacoby is renowned for his methodological creativity and prowess. Jacoby's “logic of opposition” is a methodological innovation. Psychologists have long sought to demonstrate influences of unconscious, automatic processes. A problem is that it is difficult to ensure that responses are not being influenced by conscious processes. For example, a brief prior exposure to a made-up name (e.g., Sebastian Weisdorf) might later lead people taking a test in which they judge names as famous versus nonfamous to mistake that name as famous. That could be an unconscious phenomenon – the subject simply experiences the name as famous and does not recollect the prior encounter with the name. But maybe instead the subject remembers the name from the earlier list and assumes that some or all of the names on that list were of famous people. That is, both unconscious and/or conscious uses of memory for the study-list encounter with “Sebastian Weisdorf” could influence subjects toward endorsing that name as famous. The same problem crops up in a wide range of attempts to demonstrated unconscious influences.

The logic of opposition puts conscious awareness in opposition to being influenced. One way to do this is simply to correctly inform subjects (in the case of this fame procedure) that all of the names on the study list were non-famous. Thus if a subject recollects that a name was on the study list, s/he can confidently identify it as non-famous. Jacoby, Woloshyn, and Kelley (1989) found that when subjects had studied the list with full attention, these opposition instructions led them to be less likely to endorse studied names as famous than to endorse non-studied names as famous. That shows (a) that they sometimes recognized names on the fame test as names on the study list and (b) that they understood that names on the study list were nonfamous. The cool finding was that subjects who studied the list of names under divided attention more often called studied names famous than non-studied names. Presumably dividing attention at study impaired subject ability to consciously recollect which names had been on the list, but left intact more automatic, unconscious influences of familiarity.

=== Process dissociation procedure ===
The logic of opposition proved a very valuable methodological tool in a variety of different settings. It also formed a key stepping stone in Jacoby's subsequent development of the “process dissociation procedure” (PDP), which Jacoby introduced in a 1991 article in Journal of Memory and Language that became a citation classic. The PDP is a method for obtaining separate quantitative estimates of the concurrent contributions of two different sources of influence on task performance (e.g., conscious vs. unconscious perception; habit vs. intention; familiarity vs. recollection).

For decades cognitive psychologists used individual tasks to measure specific procedures. For example, a recognition memory test might be used to index “explicit” or consciously guided uses of memory whereas a fragment-completion test might be used to index “implicit” or unconscious influences of memory. As Jacoby pointed out, there have been endless problems caused by the fact that tasks are not process-pure. For example, unconscious influences of memory can affect responses on a recognition test, and conscious recollection can affect responses on a fragment completion task. Jacoby presumed that many tasks are influenced by both controlled and automatic processes. To index them, he compared (a) performance when controlled and automatic influences would affect responding in the same direction with (b) performance when controlled influences would oppose the effects of automatic influences. Using simple algebraic equations and certain assumptions, Jacoby derived estimates of the two underlying categories of influence.

The process dissociation procedure was not without its critics (e.g.,), but there is wide agreement that many if not most task performances reflect concurrent automatic and controlled influences and there are good reasons to believe that given appropriate tasks and within certain boundary conditions the assumptions of the PDP hold (e.g.,). Jacoby and former student Andy Yonelinas provided an update on the status of the PDP in a 2012 article.

== Recent work ==
Jacoby's recent work has explored various aspects of the notion of cognitive control—ways the mind/brain constrains its own operation so as to enhance the production of some kinds of mental contents relative to others. One key notion is that control can often be exercised “at the front end” and thereby modulate the thoughts and images that come to mind (whereas most prior theorizing about control emphasized output monitoring and filtering) (e.g., Halamish, Goldsmith, & Jacoby, 2012; Jacoby, Shimizu, Daniels, & Rhodes, 2005). Another key notion is that the ability to modulate cognitive control develops across childhood and then, late in life, declines, thereby leading to aging-related memory failures (e.g., Jacoby, Rogers, Bishara, & Shimizu, 2012; Jennings & Jacoby, 2003). Jacoby's recent work with postdoc Chris Wahlheim has explored the positive effects of noticing and remembering change on forgetting caused by interference (e.g., Jacoby, Wahlheim, & Kelley, 2015); cf.

== Festschrift and Edited Volume in Honour of Jacoby ==
Roddy Roediger, Steve Lindsay, Colleen Kelley, and Andy Yonelinas organized a Festschrift in Larry's honour. The event was held at Washington University over two days in the spring of 2013 and featured 24 speakers and an audience of approximately 100 people. The celebration was generously supported by the Wash U. A book featuring 22 chapters based on talks given at this Festschrift was published in 2014 (publication year 2015) by Psychology Press.

== List of works by Jacoby et alia cited above ==
Halamish, V., Goldsmith, M., & Jacoby, L. L. (2012). Source-constrained recall: Front-end and back-end control of retrieval quality. Journal of Experimental Psychology: Learning, Memory, and Cognition, 38, 1–15. doi:10.1037/a0025053

Jacoby, L. L. (1978). On interpreting the effects of repetition: Solving a problem versus remembering a solution. Journal of Verbal Learning and Verbal Behavior, 17, 649–667.

Jacoby, L. L. (1991). A process dissociation framework: Separating automatic from intentional uses of memory. Journal of Memory and Language, 30, 513–541.

Jacoby, L. L., & Brooks, L. R. (1984). Nonanalytic cognition: Memory, perception and concept learning. In G. H. Bower (Ed.), The psychology of learning and motivation: Advances in research and theory (Vol. 18, pp. 1–47). New York: Academic Press.

Jacoby, L. L., & Dallas, M. (1981). On the relationship between autobiographical memory and perceptual learning. Journal of Experimental Psychology: General, 3, 306–340.

Jacoby, L. L., & Whitehouse, K. (1989). An illusion of memory: False recognition influenced by unconscious perception. Journal of Experimental Psychology: General, 118, 126–135.

Jacoby, L. L., Kelley, C. M., & Dywan, J. (1989). Memory attributions. In H. L. Roediger & F. I. M. Craik (Eds.), Varieties of memory and consciousness: Essays in honour of Endel Tulving (pp. 391–422). Hillsdale, NJ: Erlbaum.

Jacoby, L. L., Rogers, C. S., Bishara, A. J., & Shimizu, Y. (2012). Mistaking the recent past for the present: False seeing by older adults. Psychology and Aging, 27, 22–32. doi:10.1037/a0025924

Jacoby, L. L., Shimizu, Y., Daniels, K. A. & Rhodes, M. (2005). Modes of cognitive control in recognition and source memory: Depth of retrieval. Psychonomic Bulletin & Review, 12, 852–857.

Jacoby, L. L., Wahlheim, C. N., & Kelley, C. M. (2015). Memory consequences of looking back to notice change: Retroactive and proactive facilitation. Journal of Experimental Psychology: Learning, Memory, and Cognition, 41, 1282–1297.

Jacoby, L. L., Woloshyn, V., & Kelley, C. M. (1989). Becoming famous without being recognized: Unconscious influences of memory produced by dividing attention. Journal of Experimental Psychology: General, 118, 115–125.

Jennings, J. M., & Jacoby, L. L. (2003). Improving memory in older adults: Training recollection. Neuropsychological Rehabilitation, 13, 417–440.

McHose, H. H., Jacoby, L. L., & Meyer, P. A. (1967). Extinction as a function of number of reinforced trials and squad composition. Psychonomic Science, 9, 401–402.

Yonelinas, A. P., & Jacoby, L. L. (2012). The process-dissociation approach two decades later: Convergence, boundary conditions, and new directions. Memory & Cognition, 40, 663–680.

== External sources ==
- Larry L. Jacoby in google scholar
