= Elmar Tampõld =

Canadian-Estonian architect

- Born: 3 August 1920; Kärdla, Estonia
- Died: 7 March 2013 (aged 92); Toronto, Ontario, Canada
- Education: University of Toronto
- Occupation: Architect
- Spouse: Leida Elfriede Tampõld (née Kallis)
- Children: 2
- Awards: Order of the White Star IV Class; Ontario Association of Architects; Centennial Award Canada Housing Design Council; Canadian Architect Yearbook Award of Excellence; Canadian Housing Council Award; North York Award of Excellence
- Buildings: Rochdale College; Tartu College

Elmar Tampõld (August 3, 1920 – March 7, 2013) was an Estonian-Canadian architect and founder of an academic base for Estonian studies in Toronto.

== Education ==
Tampõld was born and raised in Kärdla on the island of Hiiumaa. He attended the Kärdla Reaalkool, graduating in 1938, and then continued his studies in the capital, Tallinn, at the Tallinn Teachers’ College. Tampõld graduated in 1941. In 1943 he enrolled in the Tallinn University of Technology, but the continuation of World War II interrupted his education. Tampõld fled to Sweden, where he resumed his studies at the Stockholm Technical Institute from 1946 until 1948, majoring in marine engineering.

After he emigrated to Canada in 1948, Tampõld attended the University of Toronto from 1949 until 1953, graduating with a Bachelor of Architecture. As a student at the University of Toronto, he received the Hobb's Glass Scholarship for highest standing in Design and was nominated for the Pilkington Award for his thesis project, "Toronto Olympic Stadium". In 1956 Tampõld was accepted as a member of both the Ontario Association of Architects and the Royal Architectural Institute of Canada. In 1997 Tampõld was nominated for and received a lifetime membership of the Ontario Association of Architects.

== Career ==
Tampõld began his architectural career in the design department of John B. Parkin and Associates, where he worked from 1953 until 1956. From 1957 to 1959 he was the Chief Architect for the Canadian office of H. K. Ferguson Company Engineers and Architects in Cleveland, Ohio, United States. In 1959, along with his classmate John Wells, he helped establish the architectural firm of Tampõld Wells. During 35 years of practice, Tampõld helped design over 1,000 buildings for public, institutional and private clients. Tampõld was known for his work with universities and higher educational facilities, and was commissioned to design buildings in Nova Scotia, Ontario and New Brunswick; offices for Tampõld Wells were eventually opened in Halifax and Montreal. The architectural firm specialized in the design and construction of university student residences, including residences for Neill-Wycik College, Pestalozzi College (now called Rideau Chapel Towers), Laurentian University, Saint Mary's University in Halifax, Acadia University, University of Fredericton, Dag Hammarskjöld House and further student residences in Waterloo, Ontario and Ann Arbor, Michigan. Many of his structures from the late 1960s and early 1970s are in the restrained Brutalism style of architecture, such as the Rochdale College tower, completed in 1968.

During his years in Canada, Tampõld was a leader in the Toronto Estonian community and helped to preserve the Estonian language and Estonian culture. In 1949 he established the University of Toronto Estonian Students' Society and was elected the organization's first President. Proceeds from the Society's events and fundraisers helped enable the founding of a scholarship fund for Estonian immigrant students and students of Estonian heritage. In 1967 Tampõld proposed the concept of a residence hall named Tartu College to the Canadian Estonian community and the University of Toronto, and from 1967 to 1970 he served in numerous roles in the implementation, construction and design of Tartu College, including as main financier, sponsor and main architect. Tampõld named the student residence hall after the Estonian University of Tartu. Completed in 1970, the building is located on Madison Avenue in Toronto, Ontario, Canada, and serves as a residence hall for University of Toronto students as well as a centre for the Estonian-Canadian community of the city. Tartu College has a long-standing relationship with Estonia's University of Tartu. In 1974, charges of professional misconduct were filed against the architectural firm, resulting in a rebuke for filing false and misleading certificates for payment.

In 1982, Tampõld proposed the idea of reinvesting Tartu College's surplus revenues for the founding of a Chair of Estonian Studies at the University of Toronto. The university agreed and in 1983, he helped establish the Chair of Estonian Studies Foundation with fellow expatriate Estonian professors, neuroscientist Endel Tulving and chemical engineer Olev Träss. The three men made the initial presentation to the University of Toronto, and Tampõld became the chairman of the board of directors for the Chair of Estonian Studies Foundation. Since 1999, Jüri Kivimäe, Professor of History and Chair of Estonian Studies, has headed the University of Toronto's Elmar Tampõld Chair of Estonian Studies.

In 1999, Tampõld established the Estonian Scholarships Fund, called the Ilmar Heinsoo Award, with support from the University of Toronto, the government of the province of Ontario, Tartu College, the Estonian Studies Fund, the Fraternitas Estica, the Estonian National Foundation, and the Estonian Credit Union. The scholarship was created in appreciation of the former Estonian honorary consul. Also in 1999, he helped merge the two Toronto-based Estonian weekly newspapers into a single weekly paper called Estonian Life.

== Legacy ==
On May 27, 2008, while visiting Canada, Estonian President Toomas Hendrik Ilves praised Tampõld in a speech given at the Estonian House in Toronto as a "builder of cultural bridges".

Tampõld continued to participate in numerous events celebrating and preserving Estonian culture. He participated in conferences and events for the Estonian Literary Museum, the Estonian Canadian Historical Commission (Kanada Eestlaste Ajaloo Komisjon) and Korporatsioon Sakala.

Tampõld had long planned to found a Museum of Estonia Abroad in Toronto (abbreviated VEMU, for the Estonian Välis-Eesti Muuseum). Tampõld envisioned the museum as a monument to the Estonian immigrant community in the West and as a higher educational and cultural institution.

Tampõld resided in Toronto, Ontario, with his wife Leida Elfriede Tampõld (née Kallis) until her death in 2011. The couple wed in 1944, were married for 67 years, and had two children, Ana and Thomas. Tampõld died at Sunnybrook Health Sciences Centre in Toronto in March 2013 at the age of 92.

== Awards ==
- Centennial Award Canada Housing Design Council, 1967
- Canadian Architect Yearbook Award of Excellence, 1968
- Canadian Housing Council Award, 1971 and 1976
- North York Award of Excellence, 1990
- Order of the White Star, IV Class, 1998
- Honorary Fellow of the University of Tartu, 2004
