= Nora Newcombe =

Canadian psychologist and academic

Nora S. Newcombe
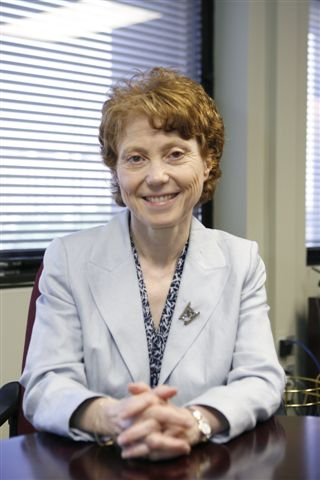
- Nora S. Newcombe, 2008, Department of Psychology, Temple University
- Born: 1951 (age 74–75); Toronto, Ontario, Canada
- Education: Harvard University, Antioch College
- Known for: Spatial development, Spatial cognition, Episodic memory
- Awards: APA Ernest R. Hilgard Lifetime Achievement Award (2020); Psychonomic Society Clifford T. Morgan Distinguished Leadership Award (2020); Society of Experimental Psychologists Howard Crosby Warren Medal (2019); Distinguished Scientific Contributions Award from the Society for Research in Child Development (2015); APA William James Fellow Award (2014)
- Scientific career
- Fields: Cognitive development, Cognitive psychology
- Workplaces: Temple University
- Doctoral advisor: Jerome Kagan

Nora S. Newcombe (born 1951 in Toronto) is the Laura H. Carnell Professor of Psychology and the James H. Glackin Distinguished Faculty Fellow at Temple University. She is a Canadian-American researcher in cognitive development, cognitive psychology and cognitive science, and expert on the development of spatial thinking and reasoning and episodic memory. She was the principal investigator of the Spatial Intelligence and Learning Center (2006-2018), one of six Science of Learning Centers funded by the National Science Foundation.

== Background ==
Newcombe attended Antioch College and completed an undergraduate degree in psychology in 1972. She continued her education at Harvard University, receiving a Ph.D. in psychology in 1976 under the supervision of Jerome Kagan. At Harvard, Newcombe collaborated with Barbara Rogoff and Kagan on studies of the development of recognition memory. Newcombe taught at Pennsylvania State University prior to joining the faculty of Temple University. She is currently a professor of psychology at Temple University.

Newcombe served terms as President of the American Psychological Association Division 7 (Developmental Psychology) (2001-2002), the Eastern Psychological Association (2008-2009), the Cognitive Development Society (2009-2011), the Federation of Associations in Behavioral & Brain Sciences (2018-2019), and the International Mind, Brain and Education Society. She previously served as the Chair of the Board of the Cognitive Science Society and Chair of the Board of Scientific Affairs of the American Psychological Association.

Newcombe is an elected Fellow of the American Academy of Arts and Sciences, the Society of Experimental Psychologists, the Association for Psychological Science, four divisions of the American Psychological Association, the American Association for the Advancement of Science, and the Cognitive Science Society. She is also a member of the National Academy of Sciences.

Newcombe was a James McKeen Cattell Fellow for a sabbatical year at Princeton in 1999-2000. In 2020 she presented the Paul B. Baltes Lecture at the Berlin-Brandenburg Academy of Sciences and Humanities. She is Editor-in-chief of Psychological Science in the Public Interest. She previously served as Editor-in-chief of Journal of Experimental Psychology: General.

== Research ==
Newcombe 's contributions to spatial cognition and its development are extensive. Her 2003 book Making Space, co-authored with Janellen Huttenlocher, synthesized decades of research and provided a new direction for the field, and provided a new conceptualization of cognitive development different from either traditional nativist or from traditional empiricist approaches.

In addition, she has worked on sex differences in cognition, beginning in the late 1970s with a critical look at a then-popular explanation of sex differences in spatial functioning in terms the onset of puberty. Since then, she has recognized the evolutionary and neural factors involved in sex differences while also emphasizing the malleability of cognitive ability as noted in the literature. (recently reprinted in a special issue celebrating 25 years of Applied Cognitive Psychology).

Newcombe has been the keynote speaker discussing relevant developments in spatial cognition at several meetings such as the Psychonomic Society, the American Psychological Society, the International Mind Brain Education Society and the German Psychological Society.

== Spatial Intelligence and Learning Center ==
Newcombe led the Spatial Intelligence and Learning Center (SILC), one of 6 NSF-funded Science of Learning Centers that explore learning in an interdisciplinary framework, during its grant period from 2006-2018. She has thus brought spatial cognition to the forefront of our conceptualization of the human intellect and its potential for learning.

In her work on memory and memory development, Newcombe has integrated research from adult cognitive psychology and neuroscience to the study of development, both in terms of distinctions between implicit and explicit memory and distinctions between semantic and episodic memory.

== Awards ==
- Elected to the National Academy of Sciences (2024)
- APA Ernest R. Hilgard Lifetime Achievement Award (2020)
- Psychonomic Society Clifford T. Morgan Distinguished Leadership Award (2020)
- Society of Experimental Psychologists Howard Crosby Warren Medal (2019)
- Distinguished Scientific Contributions Award from the Society for Research in Child Development (2015)
- APA William James Fellow Award (2014)
- APA G. Stanley Hall Award (2007)
- APA Award for Distinguished Service to Psychological Science (2006)
- Women in Cognitive Science Mentorship Award (2006)
- APA George A. Miller Award for an Outstanding Recent Article on General Psychology
  - (2003) Nora Newcombe, "The nativist-empiricist controversy in the context of recent research on spatial and quantitative development." Psychological Science, 2002, 13, 395-401.
  - (2014) David H. Uttal, Nathaniel G. Meadow, Elizabeth Tipton, Linda L. Hand, Alison R. Alden, Christopher Warren, & Nora S. Newcombe. "The malleability of spatial skills: A meta-analysis of training studies.” Psychological Bulletin, 2013, 139(2), 352-402.

== Selected works ==
=== Theory ===
- Newcombe, N. S. (2011). What is neoconstructivism? Child Development Perspectives, 5, 157-160. DOI: 10.1111/j.1750-8606.2011.00180.x
- Newcombe, N. S. (2002). The nativist-empiricist controversy in the context of recent research on spatial and quantitative development. Psychological Science, 13, 395-401. DOI:10.1111/1467-9280.00471

=== Spatial Development ===
- Learmonth, A. E., Nadel, L. & Newcombe, N. S. (2002). Children's use of landmarks: Implications for modularity theory. Psychological Science, 13, 337-341. PMID URL
- Newcombe, N. S. (2010). Picture this: Increasing math and science learning by improving spatial thinking. American Educator, 34(2), 29-35.
- Newcombe, N. S., Ratliff, K. R., Shallcross, W. L. & Twyman, A. D. (2010). Young children's use of features to reorient is more than just associative: Further evidence against a modular view of spatial processing. Developmental Science, 13, 213-220.DOI: 10.1111/j.1467-7687.2009.00877.x
- Newcombe, N. S. & Huttenlocher, J. (2000). Making space: The development of spatial representation and reasoning. MIT Press.
- Twyman, A. D. & Newcombe, N. S. (2010). Five reasons to doubt the existence of a geometric module. Cognitive Science, 34, 1315-1356.DOI: 10.1111/j.1551-6709.2009.01081.x

=== Sex Differences ===
- Newcombe, N. S. & Bandura, M. M. (1983). Effects of age at puberty on spatial ability in girls: A question of mechanism. Developmental Psychology, 19, 215-224. DOI: 10.1037/0012-1649.19.2.215
- Terlecki, M. S., Newcombe, N. S. & Little, M. (2008). Durable and generalized effects of spatial experience on mental rotation: Gender differences in growth patterns. Applied Cognitive Psychology, 22, 996-1013.DOI: 10.1002/acp.1420

=== Memory ===
- Newcombe, N. S. & Fox, N. (1994). Infantile amnesia: Through a glass darkly. Child Development, 65, 31-40. jstor Stable URL
- Newcombe, N. S., Lloyd, M. E. & Ratliff, K. R. (2007). Development of episodic and autobiographical memory: A cognitive neuroscience perspective. In R. V. Kail (Ed.), Advances in Child Development and Behavior, 35, (pp. 37–85). San Diego, CA: Elsevier. PMID URL
