= Salthouse (disambiguation) =

Salthouse is a village in Norfolk, England.

Salthouse may also refer to:

- Salthouse, Barrow-in-Furness, England
- Salthouse Dock, Liverpool, England
- Salthouse (surname), a surname
