= Salthouse (surname) =

Salthouse is an English surname. Notable people with the surname include:

- Chris Salthouse, New Zealand sailor
- John Salthouse (born 1951), British actor and producer
- Robert Salthouse (born 1965), New Zealand sailor
- Thomas Salthouse (1630–1691), English Quaker preacher and writer
- Timothy A. Salthouse, American psychologist
