= Neuropsychologia =

- Discipline: Cognitive neuroscience, psychology
- Language: English
- Edited by: S. Hamman

Publication details
- History: 1963–present
- Publisher: Elsevier
- Frequency: 14/year
- Impact factor: 3.139 (2020)

Standard abbreviations
- ISO 4: Neuropsychologia

Indexing
- CODEN: NUPSA6
- ISSN: 0028-3932 (print); 1873-3514 (web)
- OCLC no.: 01759703

Links
- Journal homepage; Online access

Neuropsychologia is a peer-reviewed scientific journal that focuses on cognitive neuroscience. It was established in 1963, and is published by Elsevier (formerly Pergamon Press). The editor-in-chief is Stephan Hamann.
