= Endel Tulving =

Canadian experimental psychologist (1927–2023)

Endel Tulving OC FRSC
- Born: May 26, 1927; Petseri, Estonia
- Died: September 11, 2023 (aged 96); Mississauga, Ontario, Canada
- Occupation: Psychologist
- Spouse: Ruth Mikkelsaar (m. 1950; died 2012)
- Children: 2

Academic background
- Education: University of Toronto (BA, MA); Harvard University (PhD)
- Thesis: The Relation of Visual Acuity to Convergence and Accommodation (1957)
- Doctoral advisor: Stanley Smith Stevens

Academic work
- Institutions: Yale University; University of Toronto; Baycrest Health Sciences
- Doctoral students: Stephan Hamann; Daniel Schacter; Lola Cuddy

Endel Tulving OC FRSC (May 26, 1927 – September 11, 2023) was an Estonian-born Canadian experimental psychologist and cognitive neuroscientist. In his research on human memory he proposed the distinction between semantic and episodic memory. Tulving was a professor at the University of Toronto. He joined the Rotman Research Institute at Baycrest Health Sciences in 1992 as the first Anne and Max Tanenbaum Chair in Cognitive Neuroscience and remained there until his retirement in 2010. In 2006, he was named an Officer of the Order of Canada (OC), Canada's highest civilian honour. A Review of General Psychology survey, published in 2002, ranked him as the 36th most cited psychologist of the 20th century

== Biography ==
Tulving was born in Petseri, Estonia, in 1927. In 1944, following the Soviet re-occupation of Estonia, Tulving (then 17 years old) and his younger brother Hannes were separated from their family and sent to live in Germany. In Germany, he finished high school and worked as a teacher and interpreter for the U.S. army. He briefly studied medicine at Heidelberg University before he immigrated to Canada in 1949. In 1950, he married Ruth Mikkelsaar, a fellow Estonian from Tartu whom he had met at a refugee camp in Germany. The couple were married until her death in 2012. They had two daughters: Elo Ann, and Linda.

Tulving attended the University of Toronto where he completed a bachelor's at University College (1953) and master's degree (1954), and earned a PhD in experimental psychology (1956) from Harvard University under the supervision of Stanley Smith Stevens. His doctoral dissertation was on the topic of oculomotor adjustments and visual acuity.

In 1956, Tulving accepted a lectureship at the University of Toronto as a lecturer, where he would remain for the rest of his career, with a brief interlude as Professor of Psychology at Yale University from 1970 to 1974. He served as Chair of the Department of Psychology from 1974 to 1980, and became a Professor in 1985. In 1992, he retired from full-time work at the University of Toronto and began working at the Rotman Research Institute. By 2019, he held the titles of Professor Emeritus at the University of Toronto and Visiting Professor of Psychology at Washington University in St. Louis.

Tulving died from complications of a stroke at a nursing home in Mississauga, Ontario, on September 11, 2023, at the age of 96.

== Research ==
Tulving published over 300 research articles and chapters, and he is widely cited, with an h-index of 124 (as of April 2024), and in a Review of General Psychology survey, published in 2002, he ranked as the 36th most cited psychologist of the 20th century. His published works in 1970s were particularly notable because they coincided with a new determination by many cognitive psychologists to confirm their theories in neuroscience using brain-imaging techniques. During this period, Tulving mapped the areas of the brain, which are considered active during the encoding and retrieval of memory, effectively associating the medial temporal lobe and the hippocampus with episodic memory. Tulving has published work on a variety of other topics, including the importance of mental organization of information in memory, a model of brain hemisphere specialization for episodic memory, and discovery of the Tulving-Wiseman function.

=== Episodic and semantic memory ===
Tulving first made the distinction between episodic and semantic memory in a 1972 book chapter. Episodic memory is the ability to consciously recollect previous experiences from memory (e.g., recalling a recent family trip to Disney World), whereas semantic memory is the ability to store more general knowledge in memory (e.g., the fact that Disney World is in Florida). This distinction was based on theoretical grounds and experimental psychology findings, and subsequently was linked to different neural systems in the brain by studies of brain damage and neuroimaging techniques. At the time, this type of theorizing represented a major departure from many contemporary theories of human learning and memory, which did not emphasize different kinds of subjective experience or brain systems. Tulving's 1983 book Elements of Episodic Memory elaborated on these concepts, and has been cited over 9000 times. According to Tulving, the ability to travel back and forward in time mentally is unique to humans and this is made possible by the autonoetic consciousness and is the essence of episodic memory.

=== Encoding specificity principle ===
Tulving's theory of "encoding specificity" emphasizes the importance of retrieval cues in accessing episodic memories. The theory states that effective retrieval cues must overlap with the to-be-retrieved memory trace. Because the contents of the memory trace are primarily established during the initial encoding of the experience, retrieval cues will be maximally effective if they are similar to this encoded information. Tulving has dubbed the process through which a retrieval cue activates a stored memory "synergistic ecphory".

One implication of the encoding specificity principle is that forgetting may be caused by the lack of appropriate retrieval cues, as opposed to decay of a memory trace over time or interference from other memories. Another implication is that there is more information stored in memory relative to what can be retrieved at any given point (i.e., availability vs. accessibility).

=== Amnesia and consciousness ===
Tulving's research has emphasized the importance of episodic memory for our experience of consciousness and our understanding of time. For example, he conducted studies with the amnesic patient KC, who had relatively normal semantic memory but severely impaired episodic memory due to brain damage from a motorcycle accident. Tulving's work with KC highlighted the central importance of episodic memory for the subjective experience of one's self in time, an ability he dubbed "autonoetic consciousness". KC lacked this ability, failing to remember prior events and also failing to imagine or plan for the future. Tulving also developed a cognitive task to measure different subjective states in memory, called the "remember"/"know" procedure. This task has been used extensively in cognitive psychology and neuroscience.

=== Implicit memory and priming ===
Tulving made a distinction between conscious or explicit memory (such as episodic memory) and more automatic forms of implicit memory (such as priming). Along with one of his students, Daniel Schacter, Tulving provided several key experimental findings regarding implicit memory. The distinction between implicit and explicit memory was a topic of debate in the 1980s and 1990s. Tulving and colleagues proposed that these different memory phenomena reflected different brain systems. Others argued that these different memory phenomena reflected different psychological processes, rather than different memory systems. These processes would be instantiated in the brain, but they might reflect different aspects of performance from the same memory system, triggered by different task conditions. More recently, theorists have come to adopt components of each of these perspectives.

== Estonian Studies Foundation ==
In 1982, architect Elmar Tampõld proposed the idea of reinvesting Tartu College's surplus revenue to found a Chair of Estonian Studies at the University of Toronto. The university agreed and in 1983, he helped establish the Chair of Estonian Studies Foundation with fellow expatriate Estonian professors, Endel Tulving and chemical engineer Olev Träss. The three men made the initial presentation to the University of Toronto and Tampõld became the chairman of the Board of Directors for the Chair of Estonian Studies Foundation. Since 1999, Jüri Kivimäe, Professor of History and Chair of Estonian Studies has headed the University of Toronto's Elmar Tampõld Chair of Estonian Studies.

== Honours and awards ==
Tulving was a member of seven distinguished societies: Fellow, Royal Society of Canada; Foreign Member, Royal Swedish Academy of Sciences; Fellow, Royal Society of London; Foreign Honorary Member, American Academy of Arts and Sciences; Foreign Associate, National Academy of Sciences; Foreign Member, Academia Europaea; and Foreign Member, Estonian Academy of Sciences.

Other honours included:

- 1983: Award for Distinguished Scientific Contributions to Psychology, American Psychological Association
- 1983: Award for Distinguished Contributions to Psychology as a Science, Canadian Psychological Association
- 1994: Gold Medal Award for Life Achievement in Psychological Science, American Psychological Foundation
- 1994: Izaak Walton Killam Memorial Prize, Canada Council
- 2005: Canada Gairdner International Award, Gairdner Foundation
- 2006: Officer of the Order of Canada (OC)
- 2007: Inducted into the Canadian Medical Hall of Fame

== Selected works ==
- Tulving, Endel (1972). Tulving, E.; Donaldson, W. (eds.). Organization of memory. New York: Academic. pp. 381–403.
- Tulving, Endel; Thomson, Donald M. (1973). "Encoding specificity and retrieval processes in episodic memory". Psychological Review. 80 (5): 352–373. doi:10.1037/h0020071. ISSN 0033-295X. S2CID 14879511.
- Craik, Fergus I. M.; Tulving, Endel (1975). "Depth of processing and the retention of words in episodic memory". Journal of Experimental Psychology: General. 104 (3): 268–294. doi:10.1037/0096-3445.104.3.268. ISSN 1939-2222. S2CID 7896617.
- Tulving, Endel (1983). Elements of episodic memory. Oxford [Oxfordshire]: Clarendon Press. ISBN 0-19-852102-2. OCLC 8552850.
- Tulving, Endel (1985). "Memory and consciousness". Canadian Psychology. 26 (1): 1–12. doi:10.1037/h0080017. ISSN 1878-7304.
- Tulving, Endel (1985). "How many memory systems are there?". American Psychologist. 40 (4): 385–398. doi:10.1037/0003-066X.40.4.385. ISSN 1935-990X. S2CID 36203045.
- Tulving, Endel; Schacter, D. (1990). "Priming and human memory systems". Science. 247 (4940): 301–306. Bibcode:1990Sci...247..301T. doi:10.1126/science.2296719. ISSN 0036-8075. PMID 2296719. S2CID 40894114.
- Tulving, Endel (2002). "Episodic Memory: From Mind to Brain". Annual Review of Psychology. 53 (1): 1–25. doi:10.1146/annurev.psych.53.100901.135114. ISSN 0066-4308. PMID 11752477. S2CID 399748.
