= Psychological Science in the Public Interest =

- Discipline: Psychology
- Language: English
- Edited by: Ulf-Dietrich Reips

Publication details
- History: 2000–present
- Publisher: Sage Publishing on behalf of the Association for Psychological Science
- Frequency: Triannually
- Impact factor: 17.6 (2024)

Standard abbreviations
- ISO 4: Psychol. Sci. Public Interest

Indexing
- ISSN: 1529-1006 (print); 2160-0031 (web)
- LCCN: 746955695
- OCLC no.: 43619255

Links
- Journal homepage; Online archive

Psychological Science in the Public Interest (PSPI) is a triannual peer-reviewed academic journal covering issues in psychology of interest to the public at large. It is published by Sage Publishing on behalf of the Association for Psychological Science. The Editor-in-chief is Ulf-Dietrich Reips (University of Konstanz).

== Past editors ==
Past editors-in-chief include Nora S. Newcombe (Temple University), Valerie F. Reyna (Cornell University), Morton Ann Gernsbacher (University of Wisconsin–Madison), Stephen J. Ceci (Cornell University), and Robert A. Bjork (University of California, Los Angeles).

== Abstracting and indexing ==
The journal is abstracted and indexed in:

- EBSCOhost
- Gale Academic OneFile
- PsycINFO
- PubMed
- Scopus

According to the Journal Citation Reports, the journal has a 2024 impact factor of 17.6, ranking in fourth for impact factor in the Psychology, Multidisciplinary Category.
