= Marcia K. Johnson =

American psychologist and scholar

- Born: 1943 (age 82–83)
- Occupations: Psychologist; scholar; professor
- Title: Sterling Professor

Academic background
- Education: University of California, Berkeley

Marcia K. Johnson (born 1943) is an American cognitive psychologist and Sterling Professor Emerita, Yale University.

She is best known for her research on human memory, and cognitive and neural mechanisms of subjective experience, including pioneering work on comprehension, reality monitoring, source monitoring, and a component process architecture of cognition and memory.

Her work has contributed to scientific understanding of how memories are constructed and distorted, how people make attributions about the origin and veridicality of their subjective experience, and how these cognitive processes are reflected in brain activity.

== Education ==
Prior to her college career, Johnson attended public schools in Oakland and Ventura, California. She received her B.A. in Psychology in 1965 and her Ph.D. in Experimental Psychology in 1971, both from the University of California, Berkeley. Undergraduate research assistant opportunities with Kathleen Archibald from the Department of Sociology and Lloyd Peterson, who was visiting from the Psychology Department at Indiana University, provided models of engaged academics working, respectively, at applied policy and basic science levels of analysis.

Along with taking undergraduate courses from Geoffrey Keppel and Dan Slobin, Johnson conducted her first experimental study and concluded that people were better at locating target abstract forms embedded among others if they had previously distinguished them using holistic schemas or concepts rather than specific features. During graduate school, as she continued to explore experimental approaches to understanding mental processes underlying memory and cognition, her doctoral advisor was Leo Postman; other mentors included Geoffrey Keppel and Donald Riley. An appointment as Visiting Scientist with Laird Cermak's group at the Memory Disorders Research Center, Boston VA (1992–1993), furthered her interests in brain networks of cognition.

== Career ==
Johnson held faculty positions at the State University of New York at Stony Brook (1970–1985), Princeton University (1985–2000), and Yale University, where she was Professor of Psychology and the Interdepartmental Neuroscience Program (2000–2016) and served as Acting Chair of Psychology in 2003 and 2013 and as Chair from 2006 to 2011. She was appointed Dilley Professor in 2004 and Sterling Professor in 2010.

Her graduate students included Shahin Hashtroudi, Frank Durso, Mary Ann Foley, Tracey Kahan, Aurora Suengas, Stephen Lindsay, Elizabeth Phelps, Kristi Multhaup, Chad Dodson, Barb Chalfonte, Mara Mather, John Reeder, Wil Cunningham, Keith Lyle, Julie Higgins, Matthew Johnson, Kyungmi Kim, Becky van den Honert, and Arber Tasimi. Postdocs included John Kounios, Jianjian Qin, Linda Henkel, and Natalie Ebner. Faculty collaborators included John Bransford, Carol Raye, William Hirst, Karen Mitchell, Mark D'Esposito, Gregory McCarthy, Marvin Chun, and Jon Simons.

== Research ==
Early in her career, Johnson explored the relationship between comprehension and memory, investigating the constructive and reconstructive nature of mental processes. This raised the critical issue of how people differentiate real from imagined or inferred events (reality monitoring). Results from studies prompted by a proposed Reality Monitoring model led to the development of the Source Monitoring Framework (SMF), a general account of how individuals make attributions about the source of subjective experiences (perceptions, memories, beliefs, knowledge) derived from sensory modalities (e.g., visual, auditory) and from associations, inferences, imagination, and other constructive cognitive processes.

According to the SMF, errors (i.e., source misattributions, distortions, false memories) arise because of characteristics of the qualitative features of mental representations from various sources. The accuracy of source attributions is affected by the extent of the similarity among features from different sources and how various features are weighted (the criteria used), which in turn are affected by factors such as rehearsal history, motivation, bias, social context, and other influences. Importantly, the same processes recruited during encoding, accessing, and evaluating generate both accurate and false memories, beliefs, and knowledge. Hence the feeling that a subjective mental experience is a true memory, reasonable belief, or accurate knowledge—and even the categorization of subjective experiences into memories, beliefs, or knowledge—are outcomes of imperfect reality/source monitoring processes.

Building on this work, Johnson introduced the Multiple-Entry Modular memory (MEM) framework, a descriptive cognitive architecture proposing how various perceptual and reflective component processes contribute to cognition. The MEM framework outlines how perception and reflection interact within and between subsystems through agendas, and how different interactions could give rise not only to different types of memory (e.g., perceptual learning, event recall) and selective disruption (e.g., from distraction, brain damage) but also to different types of consciousness (e.g., awareness, control, self-reflection) and different emotions (e.g., fear, remorse).

Members of her Memory and Cognition Lab (MEMlab) and their collaborators also worked to integrate behavioral methods with functional magnetic resonance imaging and studies of age-related changes in cognition to clarify the relation between brain function and component processes represented in, and hypotheses suggested by, the SMF and MEM. For example, neuroimaging studies showed differences in the similarity between activity in different brain regions during perceiving and imagining, and contributed to understanding the role of various areas of frontal cortex in source monitoring, executive function, and self-related processing.

Studies have also shown that proposed processes in the SMF and MEM models are susceptible to emotional influences and age-related changes. These ideas and findings have influenced studies and/or analyses of cognition in diverse domains including eyewitness testimony, therapy practice, healthy aging, and clinically significant disruptions of cognition (e.g., involving hallucinations, confabulation, or delusions).

Beyond individual cognition, Johnson expanded the scope of reality monitoring to include social and cultural cognition.

She proposed that societal institutions like the press and the courts function analogously to the brain's frontal lobes, regulating collective memory, knowledge, and beliefs through intra- and inter-institutional reality monitoring. She raised questions about how deficits in social/cultural reality monitoring could devolve into social pathologies, underscoring the broader significance of cognitive science in understanding both individual and societal functioning.

== Honors and awards ==
Johnson is a member of the National Academy of Sciences (elected 2014) and the American Academy of Arts and Sciences (elected 2021). Other honors include:

- John Simon Guggenheim Memorial Foundation Fellowship (1983)
- Fellow, Center for Advanced Study in the Behavioral Sciences (1987-1988)
- Graduate Mentor Award (2005), Yale University
- American Psychological Association Award for Distinguished Scientific Contributions (2006)
- Association for Psychological Science William James Fellow Award (2005-2006)
- American Psychological Foundation Gold Medal Award for Life Achievement in the Science of Psychology (2011)
- Fred Kavli Distinguished Career Contributions Award in Cognitive Neuroscience (2017)
- Association for Psychological Science Mentor Award (2019)
- Corresponding Fellow, British Academy (elected 2019)
- Benjamin Franklin Medal in Computer and Cognitive Science (2019)
- Society of Experimental Psychologists Lifetime Achievement Award (2022)

== Selected publications ==
- Bransford, John D.; Johnson, M. K. (1972). "Contextual prerequisites for understanding: Some investigations of comprehension and recall". Journal of Verbal Learning and Verbal Behavior. 11 (6): 717–726. doi:10.1016/S0022-5371(72)80006-9.
- Johnson, M. K.; Raye, Carol L. (1981). "Reality monitoring". Psychological Review. 88 (1): 67–85. doi:10.1037/0033-295x.88.1.67. ISSN 0033-295X.
- Johnson, M.K (1988). "Discriminating the origin of information". In Oltmanns, T. F.; Maher, B. A. (eds.). Delusional beliefs. John Wiley & Sons. pp. 34–65. ISBN 978-0471836353.
- Johnson, M.K; Sherman, S. J. (7 June 1990). "Constructing and reconstructing the past and the future in the present". In Higgins, E. T.; Sorrentino, R. M. (eds.). Handbook of motivation and cognition: Foundations of social behavior, Vol. 2, pp. ). The Guilford Press. Guilford Press. pp. 482–526. ISBN 9780898624328.
- Johnson, M. K.; Multhaup, Kristi. S. (2014-02-04). "Emotion and MEM". In Christianson, Sven-Ake (ed.). The Handbook of Emotion and Memory (0 ed.). Psychology Press. doi:10.4324/9781315807454. ISBN 978-1-317-78359-6.
- Johnson, M. K. (1992-07-01). "MEM: Mechanisms of Recollection". Journal of Cognitive Neuroscience. 4 (3): 268–280. doi:10.1162/jocn.1992.4.3.268. ISSN 0898-929X.
- Johnson, M.K.; Hashtroudi, Shahin; Lindsay, D. Stephen (1993). "Source monitoring". Psychological Bulletin. 114 (1): 3–28. doi:10.1037/0033-2909.114.1.3. ISSN 1939-1455. PMID 8346328.
- Johnson, M.K; Hirst, William (1993). "MEM: Memory Subsystems as Processes". In Collins, A. F.; Gathercole, S. E.; Conway, M.A; Morris, P. E. (eds.). Theories Of Memory. Psychology Press/Taylor & Francis. pp. 241–286. doi:10.4324/9781315782119-9. ISBN 978-1-315-78211-9.
- Johnson, M. K.; Reeder, John A. "Consciousness as Meta Processing". In Cohen, Jonathan D.; Schooler, Jonathan W (eds.). Scientific Approaches to Consciousness. Lawrence Erlbaum.
- Johnson, M. K. (1998). "Individual and Cultural Reality Monitoring". The Annals of the American Academy of Political and Social Science. 560 (1): 179–193. doi:10.1177/0002716298560001014. ISSN 0002-7162.
- Johnson, M.K; Raye, Carol L. (1998-04-01). "False memories and confabulation". Trends in Cognitive Sciences. 2 (4): 137–145. doi:10.1016/S1364-6613(98)01152-8.
- Mitchell, Karen J; Johnson, M.K; Raye, Carol L; D’Esposito, Mark (2000). "fMRI evidence of age-related hippocampal dysfunction in feature binding in working memory". Cognitive Brain Research. 10 (1–2): 197–206. doi:10.1016/S0926-6410(00)00029-X.
- Johnson, M. K.; Raye, Carol L.; Mitchell, Karen J.; Touryan, Sharon R.; Greene, Erich J.; Nolen-Hoeksema, Susan (2006-06-01). "Dissociating medial frontal and posterior cingulate activity during self-reflection". Social Cognitive and Affective Neuroscience. 1 (1): 56–64. doi:10.1093/scan/nsl004. ISSN 1749-5024. PMC 2435374. PMID 18574518.
- Chun, Marvin M.; Johnson, Marcia K. (2011-11-17). "Memory: enduring traces of perceptual and reflective attention". Neuron. 72 (4): 520–535. doi:10.1016/j.neuron.2011.10.026. ISSN 1097-4199. PMC 3248396. PMID 22099456.
- Johnson, M. K.; Kuhl, Brice A.; Mitchell, Karen J.; Ankudowich, Elizabeth; Durbin, Kelly A. (2015). "Age-related differences in the neural basis of the subjective vividness of memories: evidence from multivoxel pattern classification". Cognitive, Affective, & Behavioral Neuroscience. 15 (3): 644–661. doi:10.3758/s13415-015-0352-9. ISSN 1530-7026. PMC 5868956. PMID 25855004.
- Simons, Jon S.; Garrison, Jane R.; Johnson, M.K. (2017). "Brain Mechanisms of Reality Monitoring". Trends in Cognitive Sciences. 21 (6): 462–473. doi:10.1016/j.tics.2017.03.012.
