= Kelly Mix =

American developmental psychologist

Kelly S. Mix is an American developmental psychologist known for her research on the development of numerical concepts and their origins in infancy and toddlerhood. She is professor and chair of the Department of Human Development and Quantitative Methodology at the University of Maryland. Mix was awarded the Boyd McCandless Early Career Award (American Psychological Association, Division 7) in 2002 for her innovative research on the early emergence of numerocity. Her co-authored book Quantitative Development in Infancy and Early Childhood, with Janellen Huttenlocher and Susan Cohen Levine, provides an overview of the early development of quantitative reasoning and mathematical concepts. Her co-edited book The Spatial Foundations of Language and Cognition, with Linda B. Smith and Michael Gasser, examines the role of space in structuring human cognition.

== Biography ==
Mix obtained her B.A. degree in elementary education from Western Michigan University in 1987, and worked as an elementary school teacher for several years before returning to school to pursue advanced degrees in developmental psychology. She obtained her M.A. in 1993 and her Ph.D. in 1995 at the University of Chicago, working under the supervision of Janellen Huttenlocher. Mix served as an assistant professor/associate professor of psychology at Indiana University from 1996 to 2005. She was an associate professor/full professor of educational psychology at Michigan State University from 2005 to 2016. She has worked in the College of Education at the University of Maryland since 2016.

== Research ==
Mix is known for her cognitive developmental research on number concepts, mathematical reasoning, and symbol grounding. In her book with Huttenlocher and Levine, which focused on quantitative development in infancy through the preschool years, Mix put forth the view that infants begin life without an understanding of discrete numbers, yet are capable of distinguishing and representing quantitative amounts. In her research on the emergence of number concepts prior to formal schooling, Mix emphasizes how preschool children exhibit verbal skills, such as counting, and basic mathematical concepts of equivalence, ordinality, quantitative transformation, and place value prior to instruction. Other research has tested interventions aimed at improving children's mathematical reasoning skills.

In Number Versus Contour Length in Infants' Discrimination of Small Visual Sets, Clearfield and Mix used a visual habituation paradigm to examine infants' use of length as a cue to quantity in a number discrimination task. Infants (6- to 8-month-olds) were habituated to displays consisting of two or three black squares. They were then tested with displays that had either the same number of squares but arranged differently (novel length) or a different number of squares arranged to have the same length as the original displays (novel number). Infants dishabituated to the novel length displays, but not to the novel number displays. The authors concluded that infants based their discriminations on the length of the displays, rather than on number of objects.

In Spatial Training Improves Children's Mathematics Ability, Cheng and Mix tested whether mental rotation training improved math performance in 6- to 8-year-olds. Children were given various mathematical problems as a pretest. One group of children were given training on a mental rotation task that had been shown to improve spatial ability, while a control group of children completed crossword puzzles. Post-test scores indicated that children who received training on mental rotation showed significant improvements in solving math problems (missing term problems, such as 6 + ____ = 14), whereas the control group did not. These and other related findings indicating that spatial thinking is critical to mathematical thinking were cited in a policy report by the Ontario Ministry of Education.

== Representative publications ==
- Mix, K.S. (2008). Children's equivalence judgments: Cross-mapping effects. Cognitive Development, 23, 191–203.
- Mix, K. S., Huttenlocher, J., & Levine, S. C. (2002). Multiple cues for quantification in infancy: Is number one of them? Psychological Bulletin, 128, 278–294.
- Mix, K. S., Levine, S. C., Cheng, Y., Young, C., Hambrick, D. Z., Ping, R. & Konstantopolous, S. (2016). Separate but correlated: The latent structure of space and mathematics across development. Journal of Experimental Psychology: General, 145(9), 1206–1227.
- Mix, K. S., Levine, S. C., & Huttenlocher, J. (1999). Early fraction calculation ability. Developmental Psychology, 35(1), 164–174.
- Mix, K. S., Moore, J. A., & Holcomb, E. (2011). One-to-one toys promote development of number concepts, Journal of Cognition and Development, 12(4), 463–480.
- Mix, K. S., Prather, R. W., Smith, L. B., & Stockton, J. D. (2014). Young children's interpretations of multi-digit number names: From emerging competence to mastery. Child Development, 85, 1306–1319.
- Mix, K. S., Sandhofer, C. M., Moore, J., & Russell, C. (2011). Acquisition of the cardinal word principle: The role of input, Early Childhood Research Quarterly, 27(2), 274–283.
- Mix, K. S., Smith, L. B., Stockton, J. D., Cheng, Y. L., & Barterian, J. A. (2017). Grounding the symbols for place value: Evidence from training and long-term exposure to base-10 models. Journal of Cognition and Development, 18(1), 129–151.
