= Rochdale College =

Alternative education project in Toronto

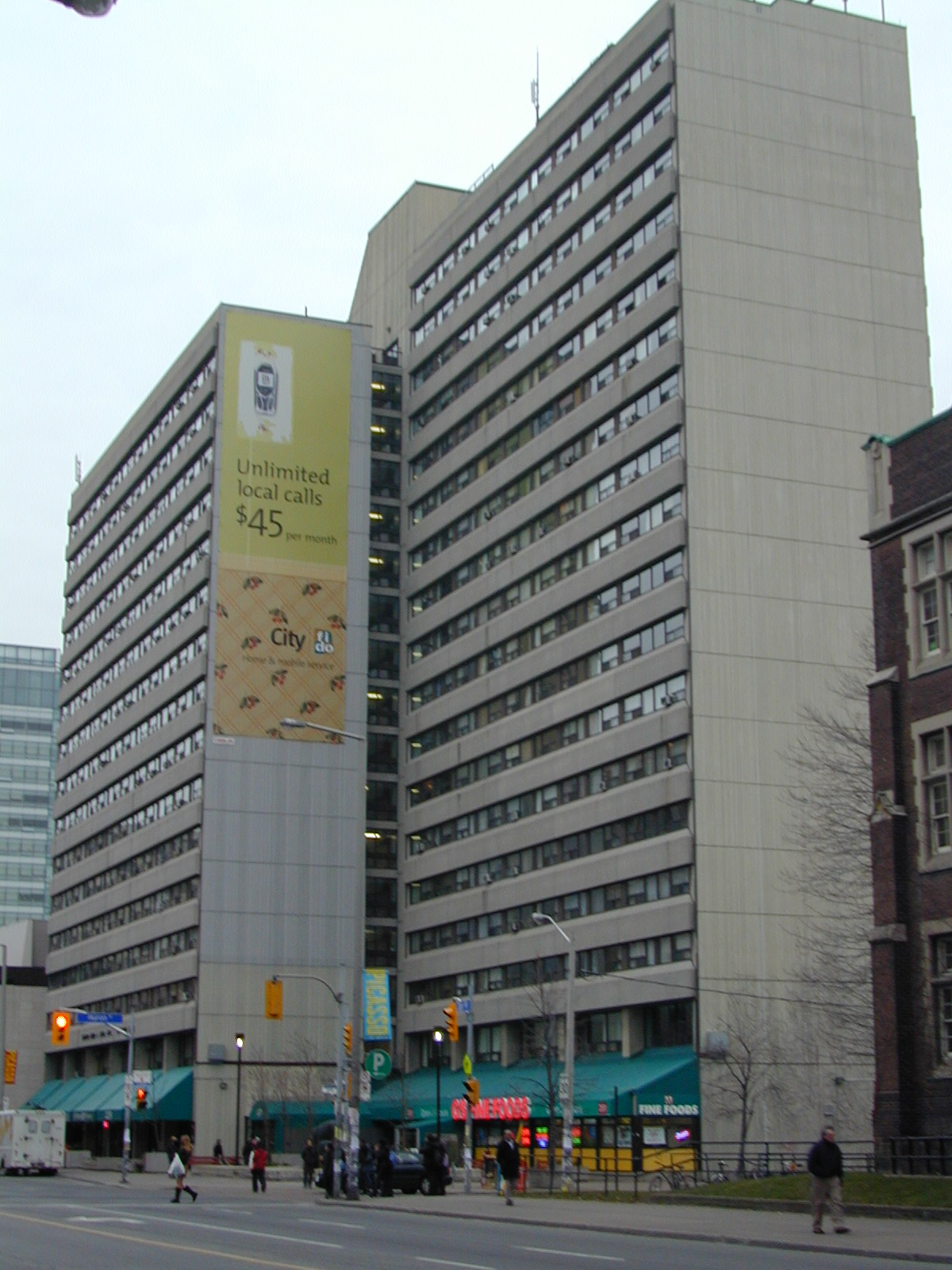
- The building that used to house Rochdale College, on Bloor Street in Toronto in 2004
- Active: 1968–1975
- Affiliations: University of Toronto
- Location: Toronto, Ontario, Canada; 43°40′01″N 79°24′03″W

Rochdale College was an experiment in student-run alternative education and co-operative living in Toronto, Canada from 1968 to 1975. It provided space for 840 residents in a co-operative living space. It was also an informal, noncredited free university where students and teachers would live together and share knowledge. The project ultimately failed when it could not cover its financing and neighbours complained that it had become a haven for drugs and crime.

== Co-operative housing experiment ==
Rochdale was the largest co-op residence in North America, occupying an 18-storey student residence at Bloor St. and Huron St. in downtown Toronto. It was situated on the edges of the University of Toronto's St. George campus, near to Yorkville, Toronto's hippie haven in the 1960s and early 1970s.

The college took its name from Rochdale, a town in north-west England, where the world's first cooperative society was established in 1844. The Rochdale Society of Equitable Pioneers is usually considered the first successful co-operative enterprise, used as a model for modern co-ops, following the 'Rochdale Principles'. A group of 28 weavers and other artisans set up the society to open their own store selling food items they could not otherwise afford. Within ten years there were over 1,000 co-operative societies in the United Kingdom.

The college's modern architecture was uniquely designed for communal living. Some areas were divided into independently operated communal units of about a dozen bedrooms (called ashrams), each with its own collective washroom, kitchen and dining room. Each unit was responsible for collecting rent and maintaining its own housekeeping. Other areas consisted of bachelor, one-bedroom, and two-bedroom apartments. On the first and second floor were common areas used for socialization, education, and commercial purposes. The roof was accessible from the 18th floor and was used for sunbathing. Clothing was optional.

== Founding ==
Rochdale began as a response to a growing need for student housing at the University of Toronto, and a nineteen-year-old entrepreneur and philosophy student, Howard Adelman, was hired by the Campus Co-operative to meet the housing demand in 1958. With Adelman's advice, Campus Co-op began to acquire more properties, and formed Campus Co-operative Residence Incorporated., a non-profit offshoot of Campus Co-op. After obtaining federal mortgages at well below the market rate, Campus Co-op incorporated Rochdale College in 1964.

It was by accident rather than design that Rochdale became such a tall building. Campus Co-op preferred to have the building be built to two times coverage, which would have resulted in a relatively easily managed building whose floor area would be only twice the size of the lot. However, due to Rochdale's location on a busy arterial road, the site was zoned at seven times coverage. This meant an unanticipated jump to 840 residents, a fact that was originally greeted with great enthusiasm, due to the expansionist attitudes of the founders. Zoning regulations also stipulated that the site was to be an apartment-hotel, which meant that only half the floor space could be used for apartments with self-contained kitchens. This disadvantage was not fully appreciated due to faith in a communal system, in which residents would be expected to effectively share the space available to them.

In addition, the west and east wings differed by planners’ fiat in matters of self-containment and density of intended occupation. The west wing attracted a population that was relatively stable, an attraction helped by one-year leases, while the east wing attracted more transient tenants. The west-wing units were more in demand, not surprisingly when the rent structure in the first years gave an Aphrodite for two at $135 a month in the west wing and a Gnostic for two, with less space, at $200 a month in the east. With this rent structure, for some time the east wing subsidized the “landed gentry” in the west. The west wing with its self-contained units [the apartments] tended to stay aloof from the east wing [the hotel], and east-wing residents often were uninterested in the operations of the College. In a symbolic rather than a practical sense, a visible seal was put on this east-west division by a fire door that split the floors in half.

Campus Co-op, the parent corporation of Rochdale College, was uncomfortable with education taking a central role at Rochdale, a position held strongly by Rochdale's intellectual leaders such as Dennis Lee. A decision was made to separate from Campus Co-op. Further emphasis was placed on education when Adelman noted that the college's $175,000 property tax could be avoided if they had a functioning educational program. In Adelman's words, if "we run an education program for $75,000, we'll come out $100,000 ahead."

Although many Rochdale founders viewed its education program as a form of tax avoidance, those who were dedicated to Rochdale as an educational institution did not let that deter them from pursuing what they viewed as a more noble purpose. Dennis Lee, the creative talent of the operation, notes plans like the tax avoidance scheme were, "primarily in the thinking of people like Howard who were involved in the planning, they did a good job of keeping their cards fairly close to their chest. It was not something that was being passed around generally, [...] it would have made other people completely furious to hear it at the time." Yet it would be inaccurate to conclude that Adelman, the organizational talent of the operation, did not share its educational goals. With Lee, Adelman edited a collection of articles published in 1968 that constituted a manifesto of sorts for "free university" education, calling for liberation from inhibiting educational institutions. Adelman's contribution was a particularly scathing indictment of the modern university as an institution that stifles innovation and serves only the establishment.

Even before its construction, there was a tension in Rochdale between fiscal responsibility and idealism. Mietkiewicz writes, "[p]erhaps because of their idealistic preoccupations, few of Rochdale's academic leaders were fully aware that much of Campus Co-op's enthusiasm for education had stemmed from its vision of the program as a sort of tax dodge."

== Transition ==
The originally intended tenants for Rochdale were screened. Screenings were handled by residents of the Rochdale Houses, a precursor "dry-run" to Rochdale conducted at Campus Co-op owned houses, and they chose people who were by and large going to be associated with the University of Toronto. However, a construction strike in 1967 that delayed the opening of Rochdale by half a year changed Rochdale's population from what was supposed to be a carefully selected one to a completely random one. The screened applicants, most of whom had commitments to the university, could not wait for Rochdale to be completed and many found new accommodations. The simple fact that the building was still in some ways a construction site may have deterred many of the students who were attracted to the idea of the hip, alternative education envisioned by its founders, torpedoing the raison d’être for the enterprise on day one. In contrast, Toronto’s hippies were undeterred by the dust and debris. Following the month-long hepatitis scare that had swept through their nearby Yorkville scene and looking towards the long winter to come, they weren’t exactly picky. They poured into this apparent haven by the hundreds.

When the college was slowly completed floor by floor, a practical decision was made to make the building available to "people who walked in right off the street." As the small group of founders later stated: "[w]e were sealing the fate of the Rochdale that most of us had wanted to experiment with. And since there were very few rules about how the place would be run, we were in effect handing the building over to people very unlike ourselves." "If the new residents were a problem to the resource people, non-residents were a problem to everyone," says Rochdale chronicler and Ohio University Lecturer David Sharpe. "As Rochdalians claimed floor by floor in the fall of 1968, transients discovered wide open areas on the upper floors and moved in – and out and in and out. As those areas became permanently occupied, the transients continued to wander and squat and wander again. Meanwhile, word of mouth, word of press, called out: A free college! A college so unlicensed that it offers, not freedom or license, but both. Freedom from parents, freedom from rent, freedom even from an address. Thousands of visitors and interim residents came from the roads and the suburbs.

"Metro had a little school
Its name was black as sin
And day and night the Metro kids
Were screaming to get in." (Rochdale Daily)

== Educational ideals ==
In the late 1960s, universities were centres of political idealism and experimentation. Rochdale College was established as an alternative to what were considered traditional paternalistic and non-democratic governing bodies within university education. Conversely, Rochdale's government policy was decided at open meetings in which all members of the co-operative could attend, participate in debate, and engage in consensus decision making.

It was the largest of more than 300 tuition-free universities in North America and offered no structured courses, curriculum, exams, degrees, or traditional teaching faculty. Beginning with seminars on phenomenology and a recorder consort that performed with the London (Ontario) Symphony Orchestra, it became associated with freethought and radical idealism.

Rochdale College never used traditional professors or structured classes. Posting notices on bulletin boards and in a student newsletter, groups of students coalesced around an interest, and "resource people" were found with various academic and non-academic backgrounds, who led informal discussion groups on a wide variety of subjects. Resource persons of note included an Anglican priest, Alderman and later Member of Parliament, Dan Heap, author Dennis Lee and Futurian Judith Merril, who founded Rochdale's library.

Rochdale participants were involved with various cultural institutions in Toronto such as Coach House Press, Theatre Passe Muraille, The Toronto Free Dance Theatre, This Magazine is About Schools (now This Magazine), the Spaced-out Library (now the Merril Collection of the Toronto Public Library) and House of Anansi Press. Rochdale's co-op daycare Acorn (which was relocated from the Rochdale site to the basement of nearby St. Thomas Church) lives on today as Huron Playschool Cooperative.

Students had complete freedom to develop their own learning process, much of which emerged from the shared community experience. The college included theatres for drama and film, and a ceramics studio. Students decided school policy and made their own evaluations.

It was typical of the free universities not to award degrees and the University of Toronto did not offer degrees through Rochdale College. Indicative of the playful humour of the times, anyone could purchase a BA by donating $25 to the college and answering a simple skill-testing question. An MA cost $50, with the applicant choosing the question. A PhD cost $100, no questions asked.

The Rochdale application also described its "non-degree": "We are also offering Non-Degrees at comparable rates. A Non-BA is $25.00. Course duration is your choice; requirements are simple, we ask that you say something. A Non-MA is $50.00 for which we require you to say something logical. A Non-PhD is $100.00; you will be required to say something useful." Nobody at Rochdale ever took these degrees seriously, and the fees (if any were collected) were treated as voluntary donations.

"1970–73 is the period that has always interested observers of the College most," Henderson writes, "[filled with] sustained attempts at building the truly functional alternative social structures, communities, and facilities that characterized the period. Residents, realizing that they were edging towards a kind of separate society right there in the building, founded a health clinic (where babies were born!), a library, a range of food services, a child care centre, an in-house radio and TV station, a vibrant newspaper, and a series of floor-wide communes." Its own pirate radio station was called CRUD, with an unusual assortment of music, talk, and static. The Canadian Radio-television and Telecommunications Commission tried to shut the station down a number of times, but the dedication of its staff kept it on the air. Rochdale had a large cafeteria and a ground-floor restaurant open to the public. It had a health-food store, a laundromat on the roof, a day-care, a free school called Superschool where the kids designed their own curriculum, and a medical clinic run by an RN. "It is often claimed," says Henderson, "that some inhabitants didn’t go outside for weeks and months at a stretch, since they could access everything they needed right within the building."

== Drug culture ==
Rochdale was originally a refuge for idealists. Ultimately, the constituents of its cooperative idealism were its downfall. Dedicated to consensus decision making and granting a vote to everyone who lived (or claimed to live) in the building, Rochdale's governing body was unable to reach agreement to expel those who failed to pay their rents or otherwise live up to its ideals. Unable to pay its mortgage to the Canadian government, Rochdale drifted towards insolvency. As nearby Yorkville became gentrified during the late 1960s, much of Toronto's counterculture moved into Rochdale. This included homeless squatters and bikers who dealt hard drugs, along with a substantial number of undercover officers from the Royal Canadian Mounted Police.

Judith Merril, librarian at Rochdale during the early 1970s, reported that Robert MacDonald, an employee of the Addiction Research Foundation, maintained a presence at Rochdale and actively collected samples of the available drugs, which were lab tested for toxicity and the results made available to Rochdale residents.

According to the CBC Archives, by 1971 Rochdale had become known as "'North America's largest drug distribution warehouse.' Hash, pot, and LSD are in large supply. The Rochdale security force includes members of biker gangs" Hiring the bikers for security in late 1971 was the beginning of the end. Until then there was a strict unwritten code that no one sold hard drugs out of Rochdale.

CBC Archives also describe how "[d]ue to problems with cops and bikers, the governing council set up a paid security force to be on 24-hour alert. Ironically, some of these security people were bikers themselves. As had happened in Yorkville, an unofficial alliance with the Vagabonds outlaw motorcycle club developed." Rochdale's educational focus and student population declined as the drug business increased.

After increased clashes with police, and unable to pay its mortgage, political pressure forced financial foreclosure by the government, and Rochdale closed in 1975. A number of residents refused to leave. On 30 May the last residents were carried from the building by police. The doors to the college had to be welded shut to keep them out. "When it was clear that the game was up," writes Sharpe, "Rochdale published its own wry comment: 'Drugdealing is now the domain of the professionals, i.e. lawyers, doctors, etc. Let's hope they never get to live in the same building.'"

== The building ==
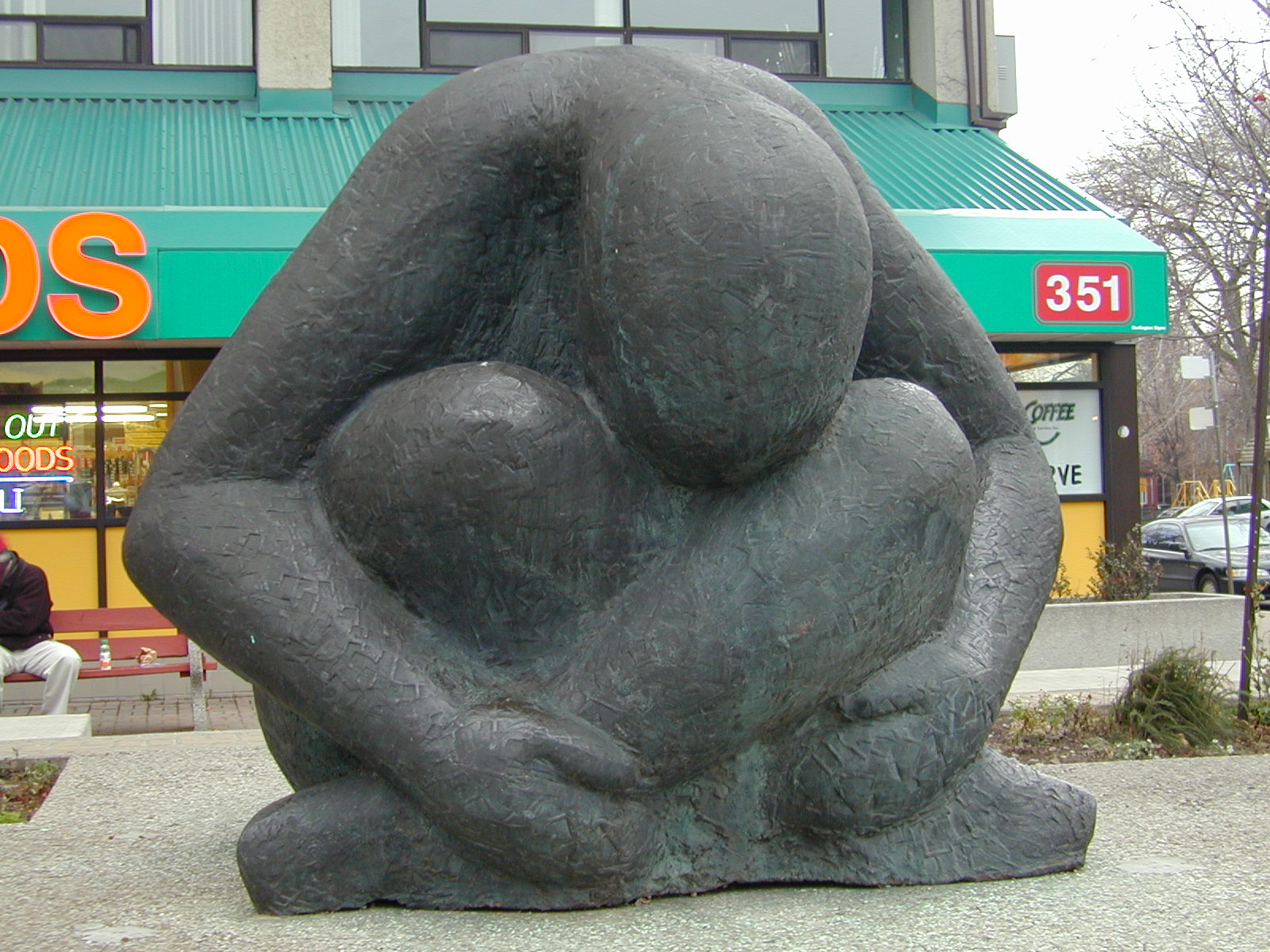
The Unknown Student sculpture in front of the Rochdale building on Bloor St.

The 18-storey tower that once housed Rochdale at 341 Bloor Street is now known as the Senator David A. Croll Apartments. Completed in 1968, it is the sister building to the Tartu student residence a short distance west across Bloor street. Designed by the architects Elmar Tampõld and John Wells (who had earlier constructed the Charles Street Apartments at Bay Street and Bloor Street).

== In retrospect ==
"Love it or loathe it, Rochdale College is hard to dismiss even 20 years after its closing." (University of Toronto Magazine, Spring, 1995, p. 38.)

"At its best," Sharpe writes, "Rochdale was a noble experiment. It tested new approaches to education, creativity, and community, and like the testing of new products in industry, the limits of a new product cannot be known until the point of destruction is reached. This product of the Sixties -- the mix of ideals and attitudes that Rochdale concentrated from the surrounding youth culture -- had to be dropped from a height, pounded, stretched, and put under heat. The accomplishment of Rochdale cannot be separated from its eventual destruction, and an institution that was not allowed to be self-destructive about such sweeping questions would have tested nothing at all."

Judith Merril writes, comparing University of Toronto's nearby Ontario Institute for Studies in Education with Rochdale: "At OISE, as at Rochdale, ninety-nine starts out of a hundred are false ones. At OISE, of course, they have to keep records of all that money, so they know what they've tried that didn't work, and maybe why, and maybe what to try next. At Rochdale, they have to keep trying the same inexpensive things over and over, because they have no money and no records -- and sometimes something works after a while. Which way is worse?"

The story of Rochdale was turned into a play by Canadian playwright, David Yee, and was staged during the Summerworks theatre festival in 2022.

== See also ==
- The National Film Board of Canada documentary `Dream Tower` (1994) directed by Ron Mann, documents Rochdale College, a controversial experiment combining free university and student residence.
- Ken Westerfield was a 1971-2 resident and disc sports pioneer.
- List of Brutalist structures
