= John Jonides =

American cognitive neuroscientist and psychologist

- Born: December 8, 1947 (age 78)
- Education: University of Pennsylvania (Ph.D., 1975)
- Spouse: Linda K. Jonides
- Awards: 2011 William James Fellow Award from the Association for Psychological Science
- Scientific career
- Fields: Cognitive neuroscience
- Workplaces: University of Michigan
- Thesis: Anatomy of an anomaly: The category-effect in visual search (1975)
- Doctoral advisor: Henry Gleitman

John Jonides (born December 8, 1947) is an American cognitive neuroscientist and psychologist. He is the Edward E. Smith Professor of Psychology and Neuroscience at the University of Michigan. He has been a fellow of the American Association for the Advancement of Science since 1995 and of the Society of Experimental Psychologists since 1996. He is known for his research on the malleability of human intelligence, and on the effects of Facebook use on happiness and life satisfaction. In 2011, he received the Association for Psychological Science's William James Fellow Award.
