= Daniel Schacter =

American psychologist (born 1952)

- Born: June 17, 1952 (age 74); Scarsdale, New York, U.S.
- Known for: Human memory and amnesia

Academic background
- Education: University of North Carolina at Chapel Hill (BA); University of Toronto (MA, PhD)
- Doctoral advisor: Endel Tulving

Daniel Lawrence Schacter (born June 17, 1952) is an American psychologist. He is William R. Kenan, Jr.'s endowed professor of psychology at Harvard University. His research has focused on psychological and biological aspects of human memory and amnesia, with a particular emphasis on the distinction between conscious and nonconscious forms of memory and, more recently, on brain mechanisms of memory and brain distortion, and memory and future simulation.

== Education ==
Schacter received his B.A. from the University of North Carolina at Chapel Hill in 1974, M.A. and Ph.D. from the University of Toronto in Canada in 1977 and 1981 respectively. His Ph.D. thesis was supervised by Endel Tulving. In 1978, he was a visiting researcher at the University of Oxford's Department of Experimental Psychology. He has also studied the effects of aging on memory.

== Research ==
Professor Schacter's research uses both cognitive testing and brain imaging techniques such as positron emission tomography and functional magnetic resonance imaging. Schacter has written three books, edited seven volumes, and published over 200 scientific articles and chapters. His books include: Searching for Memory: The Brain, the Mind, and the Past (1996); Forgotten ideas, neglected pioneers: Richard Semon and the story of memory. (2001); and The Seven Sins of Memory: How the Mind Forgets and Remembers (2001).

In The Seven Sins of Memory: How the Mind Forgets and Remembers, Schacter identifies seven ways ("sins") that memory can "fail us". The seven sins are: Transience, Absent-Mindedness, Blocking, Misattribution, Suggestibility, Persistence, and Bias.

In addition to his books, Schacter publishes regularly in scientific journals. Among the topics that Schacter has investigated are: Alzheimer's disease, the neuroscience of memory, age-related memory effects, issues related to false memory, and memory and simulation. He is widely known for his integrative reviews, including his seminal review of implicit memory in 1987.

In 2012 he said in an interview to the American Psychologist journal that our brain is like a time machine, or to be precise, it works as a virtual reality simulator. He also said that our brain can imagine the future but it has difficulty in retracing the past.

He has been the first author on multiple editions of the textbooks Psychology and Introducing Psychology, both having six editions as of 2023.

== Honors and awards ==
He was elected a Fellow of the American Academy of Arts and Sciences in 1996. In 2005 Schacter received the NAS Award for Scientific Reviewing from the National Academy of Sciences. He was elected to membership in NAS in 2013.

== Representative Publications ==
- Buckner, R. L., Andrews‐Hanna, J. R., & Schacter, D. L. (2008). The brain's default network. Annals of the New York Academy of Sciences, 1124(1), 1-38.
- Schacter, D. L. (1992). Priming and multiple memory systems: Perceptual mechanisms of implicit memory. Journal of Cognitive Neuroscience, 4(3), 244–256.
- Schacter, D. L. (2008). Searching for memory: The brain, the mind, and the past. Basic Books.
- Schacter, D. L., Addis, D. R., & Buckner, R. L. (2007). Remembering the past to imagine the future: the prospective brain. Nature Reviews Neuroscience, 8(9), 657–661.
- Schacter, D. L., & Graf, P. (1986). Effects of Elaborative Processing on Implicit and Explicit Memory for New Associations. Journal of Experimental Psychology: Learning, Memory, and Cognition, 12(3), 432–444.
- Tulving, E., & Schacter, D. L. (1990). Priming and human memory systems. Science, 247(4940), 301–306.
