= Stephan Hamann =

American psychologist

- Education: University of California, Berkeley (B.A., 1988), University of Toronto (Ph.D., 1993)
- Scientific career
- Fields: Psychology, neuroscience
- Workplaces: Emory University
- Thesis: Comparing implicit and explicit performance in perceptual and conceptual tasks: applicability of a generation/recognition model (1993)
- Doctoral advisor: Endel Tulving

Stephan Hamann is an American psychologist and professor of psychology at Emory University in Atlanta, Georgia, where he has worked since 1996. His research focuses on understanding the neural basis of emotion, memory, and their interaction, using a combination of neuroimaging and neuropsychological approaches. He is currently Editor-in-Chief of the journal Neuropsychologia.
