= Thomas Salthouse =

English Quaker preacher and writer

- Born: 1630; Lancashire
- Died: 1691 (aged 60–61)
- Occupations: Quaker preacher and writer

Thomas Salthouse (1630–1691) was an English Quaker preacher and writer.

== Biography ==
Salthouse was born in Lancashire in 1630, probably at Dragley Beck, an outlying district in Ulverston parish, about half a mile from Swarthmoor Hall. After a scanty education, Salthouse was employed as land steward by Judge Thomas Fell at Swarthmoor Hall (Wastfield, True Testimony, p. 43; Webb, Fells of Swarthmoor, pp. 41, 146), and was converted to quakerism, with the other inmates of the house, on George Fox's first visit there in 1652. His brother Robert also became a quaker. Two years later he set out with Miles Halhead to visit Cornwall, where many of the sect were in prison. On reaching Honiton, they were taken for cavaliers and imprisoned a fortnight. Being passed on as ‘vagrants’ (although described as ‘men of substance and reputation, who travelled on horseback, lodged at the best inns, and paid punctually’), they reached Taunton, where the officer in command released them. On 16 May 1655 they arrived in Plymouth, and were re-arrested. This time the quakers were taken for jesuits, and for refusing the oath of abjuration of popery were sent to Exeter Castle, removed to the gaol, and detained more than seven months, with much ill-usage, which is detailed in ‘The Wounds of an Enemy in the House of a Friend’ (1656, 4to). On being released Salthouse held meetings in Somerset, and was again arrested at Martock on 24 April 1657. He was sent to Ilchester gaol, brought up at Taunton, fined, and condemned to remain in prison until the fine was paid (A True Testimony of Faithful Witnesses, &c., London, 1657, 4to, part by Salthouse). The chief charge against him was invariably that he was a ‘wandering person who gave no account of any visible estate to live on.’

Salthouse met George Fox in Devonshire in 1663 (Journal, 8th edit. ii. 6). In April 1665 he was fined for preaching at Kingston, Surrey, and, refusing to pay, was imprisoned seven weeks in the White Lion prison, Southwark. When Charles II's proclamation against papists and nonconformists was issued in March 1668, Salthouse wrote from Somerset to Margaret Fell: ‘We are preparing our minds for prisons in these parts, for though papists are named we are like to bear the greatest part of the sufferings .... and we are resolved to meet, preach, and pray, in public and private, in season and out of season, in city, town, or country, as if it had never been’ (Barclay, Letters of Early Friends, p. 245). As he anticipated, he was many times in prison, and more than once refused his liberty on the terms offered, viz. to return to Lancashire and engage not to visit the south for three years. For preaching at a funeral in Cornwall on 8 February 1681 he was fined 20l. Subsequently, he was three years in Launceston gaol for refusing the oath of allegiance. He died on 29 January 1690–1 at St. Austell, and was buried on 1 February. He married, on 10 November 1670, Anna Upcott (d. 5 July 1695), daughter of the puritan rector of St. Austell.

Salthouse wrote:

- ‘An Epistle to the Anabaptists,’ 1657.
- ‘The Lyne of True Judgment,’ &c., London, 1658, 4to; this was written with John Collens in reply to Thomas Collier's answer to the above epistle. Collier then attacked him in ‘The Hypocrisie and Falsehood of T. Salthouse discovered’ (1659), which Robert Wastfield answered on Salthouse's behalf.
- ‘A Manifestation of Divine Love, written to Friends in the West of England,’ London, 1660, 4to.
- ‘A Candle lighted at a Coal from the Altar,’ London, 1660, 4to.
- ‘An Address to both Houses of Parliament, the General, and Officers of the Army,’ 15 May 1660, on the ill-treatment experienced by the Friends at a meeting in their hired house in Palace Yard, Westminster.
- ‘To all the Christian Congregation of the Peculiar People … of Quakers,’ 1662, 4to.
- ‘Righteous and Religious Reasons’ in ‘A Controversy between the Quakers and Bishops,’ London, 1663, 4to.
- ‘A Loving Salutation, from the White Lion Prison,’ London, 1665, 4to.
- ‘A Brief Discovery of the Cause for which the Land Mourns’ (with reference to the plague), 1665, 4to.
