= Implicit memory =

Type of long-term human memory

In psychology and neuroscience, implicit memory is one of the two main types of long-term human memory. It is acquired and used unconsciously, and can affect thoughts and behaviours. One of its most common forms is procedural memory, which allows people to perform certain tasks without conscious awareness of these previous experiences; for example, remembering how to tie one's shoes or ride a bicycle without consciously thinking about those activities.

The type of knowledge that is stored in implicit memory is called implicit knowledge, implicit memory's counterpart is known as explicit memory or declarative memory, which refers to the conscious, intentional recollection of factual information, previous experiences and concepts.

Evidence for implicit memory arises in priming, a process whereby subjects are measured by how they have improved their performance on tasks for which they have been subconsciously prepared. Implicit memory also leads to the illusory truth effect, which suggests that subjects are more likely to rate as true those statements that they have already heard, regardless of their truthfulness.

== Evidence and current research ==
=== Early research ===
Advanced studies of implicit memory began only in the 1980s. In early research, subjects were presented with words under different conditions and were given two types of tests: recognition memory tests and perceptual identification tests. These studies provided evidence that effects of memory on perceptual identification was independent of recognition memory. Jacoby & Brooks argued that perceptual identity effects reflect very rapid, context-specific learning. Unconscious influences of memory were found to alter the subjective experiences of participants. In one such study, participants judged that the white background noise was lower when they read words they had already been presented, thus misattributing their ease of perceiving the word to less noisy environment. This provided evidence for specific and long-living influences of past memory even when participants were unaware of its influence. Similar effects have been found with studies where participants made judgments about difficulty of anagrams and recognized famous names.

=== Priming studies ===
The effect of implicit memory was tested employing priming procedures. Several studies confirm implicit memory as a separate entity. In one such experiment, participants were asked to listen to several songs and decide if they were familiar with the song or not. Half of the participants were presented with familiar American folk songs and the other half were presented with songs made using the tunes of the same songs from group 1 but mixed with new lyrics. Results show that participants in group 1 had a much higher chance of recalling the songs as being familiar, even though in both groups, the tunes of the songs were the same. This study shows that people are even implicitly making connections amongst their memories. Much memory study focuses on associative memory, or memories formed between two entities, linking them together in the brain. This study shows that people implicitly make a strong associative connection between a song's tune and its lyrics that they can't separate later.

Some clues as to the anatomical basis of implicit memory have emanated from recent studies comparing different forms of dementia. Patients with dementia of the Alzheimer type (DAT) have been reported to be severely impaired on both lexical and semantic priming tasks, while patients with Huntington's disease (HD) were able to demonstrate normal priming ability (Shimamura et al., 1987; Salmon et al., 1988). In contrast, HD patients evidenced little learning on a pursuit-rotor task that was easily mastered by both amnesic and DAT patients (Eslinger and Damasio, 1986; Heindel et al., 1988). This possible double dissociation involving HD and DAT patients suggests that different implicit memory tasks are mediated by distinct neural systems and that these tasks can be used to differentiate some of the so-called "cortical" (e.g., DAT) from "subcortical" (e.g., HD) dementias (Cummings and Benson, 1984).

A more recent contribution to the study of implicit memory comes from the experiments with a spatial organization computer game on amnesic patients (Stickgold et al., 2000). Damage to the bilateral temporal lobe and hippocampus had caused the loss of explicit memory. However, despite being unable to recall the game, these patients were able to dream of it at sleep onset. This observation is interesting as it shows that learning can be memorized without the contribution of explicit memory, which requires the activation of the hippocampus and of the temporal and basal cortex. In the cases observed by Stickgold et al., the explicit memory was definitely impaired, but a non-explicit and non-conscious kind of memory was left and could emerge in dreams. This observation shows that an experience can be stored in the implicit memory and can be represented symbolically in dreams.

=== Current research ===
According to Daniel L. Schacter, "The question of whether implicit and explicit memory depend on a single underlying system or on multiple underlying systems is not yet resolved." The findings display such a variety of phenomena that there has not yet been a theory to account for all of the observations. Instead, two theories have been presented to explain different subsets of the data.

Modern discoveries in neuropsychology concerning the organization of memory allow us to hypothesize that some synaptical cortical and subcortical circuits form the seat of unconscious mental functions. The possibility of identifying, in the explicit and implicit memory respectively, the repressed and unrepressed unconscious opens new and stimulating perspectives for an integration of neuroscience with psychoanalysis, and for a possible anatomic localization of the functions of these two different forms of unconscious. This depends on a presupposition: that the experiences, emotions, phantasies, and defences that help organize an individual's unconscious psychic reality, from birth throughout life, are stored in the nervous structures concerning memory, both implicit and explicit. This is, after all, in line with Freud's conviction: 'latent conceptions, if we have any reason to suppose that they exist in the mind—as we had in the case of memory—let them be denoted by the term "unconscious"' (1912, p. 260).

There are usually two approaches to studying implicit memory. The first is to define a characteristic associated with explicit memory. If a person with a normal working memory can solve the task (e.g. remembering a list of words), then they are consciously recalling a memory. The second approach invokes neither a conscious nor an unconscious response. This approach is dependent on many independent variables that affect the response of a person's implicit and explicit memory.

== Development ==
Empirical evidence suggests infants are only capable of implicit memory because they are unable to intentionally draw knowledge from pre-existing memories. As people mature, they are usually capable of intentional recollection of memory, or explicit memory. But amnesic patients are usually the exception to developing memory, but are still capable of undergoing priming, to some extent. Since procedural memory is based on automatic responses to certain stimuli, amnesic patients are not affected by their disability when behaving habitually.

Childhood is when knowledge representation grows quickly. New concepts are formed from experience through poorly understood inductive processes. Word knowledge grows rapidly, perhaps at one a day. These processes are currently poorly understood, and may be unconscious.

Although the explicit–implicit distinction was introduced during the 1980s, the sort of contrast that it captures is not new; related distinctions between conscious and unconscious memories, to take just one example, have been around for more than a century (for historical considerations, see Roediger, 1990b; Schacter, 1987). The critical development during the past decade has been the systematic demonstration, exploration, and attempted explanation of dissociations between explicit and implicit memory. Some of these dissociations have been provided by experiments demonstrating that brain-damaged amnesic patients with severe impairments of explicit memory can exhibit intact implicit memory; others come from studies showing that specific experimental variables produce different and even opposite effects on explicit and implicit memory tasks.

The discovery of implicit memory was made by Warrington and Weiskrantz (1974) who studied with priming experiments patients affected by Korsakov's amnesia, in which the structures of explicit memory are damaged. Subsequently, the procedural dimension of implicit memory has been confirmed. As well as this, the emotional and affective dimension of implicit memory is of particular interest for psychoanalysis. It is linked to the earliest, most significant experiences of the infant with the mother and the surrounding environment.

=== Activation processing ===
Activation processing is one of two parts in Mandler's dual processing theory. According to Mandler, there are two processes that operate on mental representations. The first is activation, where increased activity causes a memory to be more distinctive. This increases the familiarity component of the memory, which explains results from priming effects. The second is elaboration, which is a conscious memory used to encode explicit memories that involves activation, but also creating new relationships amongst existing memories.

=== Multiple memory system ===
The multiple memory system theory ascribes the differences in implicit and explicit memory to the differences in the underlying structures. The theory says that explicit memories are associated with a declarative memory system responsible for the formation of new representations or data structures. In contrast, implicit memories are associated with a procedural memory system where memories are just modifications of existing procedures or processing operations.

Progress in identifying the structures and connections that make up the medial temporal lobe memory system has been paralleled by gains in understanding how this system participates in memory functions. An important step in this achievement was the insight that the hippocampal formation is important for only a particular kind of memory. The implication was that memory is not a single entity but consists of multiple processes or systems. Converging evidence about the selective role of the hippocampal formation in memory is now available from rats, monkeys, and humans. It took time for the idea of multiple memory systems to become firmly established. In 1962, the severely impaired amnesic patient H. M. was reported to be capable of day-to-day improvement in a hand–eye coordination skill, despite having no memory for the practice sessions (Milner, 1962). Nevertheless, subsequent discussions of memory in general and amnesia in particular tended to set aside motor skill learning and to focus on the unitary nature of the rest of memory. Amnesia was considered to impair memory globally, with the recognition that an exception should be made for motor skills.

== Memory as tool vs. memory as object ==
Jacoby and Kelly posited that memory could serve as both an object and a tool. Memory is treated as an object in recall or recognition; it can be inspected and described to others. In this case, the focus is on the past. However, memory (from the past) can be used as a tool to perceive and interpret present events. When riding a bicycle, one's focus is on travelling down the road, rather than the specifics of keeping balance. A bicyclist may not even be able to specify the particulars of balancing. In this case, the past memory of keeping one's balance serves as a tool rather than an object.

When used as a tool, the use of a memory is unconscious because the focus is not on the past, but on the present that is being aided by the past memory. Memory can serve as a tool even when one is unable to recall or recognize the influence of the past memory. This distinction between the two functions of memory set the stage for understanding the role of unconscious (or implicit) memory.

== Illusion-of-truth effect ==
The illusion-of-truth effect states that a person is more likely to believe a familiar statement than an unfamiliar one. In a 1977 experiment participants were asked to read 60 plausible statements every two weeks and to rate them based on their validity. Some of these statements, both true and false ones, were presented more than once in different sessions. Results showed that participants were more likely to rate as true statements the ones they had previously heard (even if they didn't consciously remember having heard them), regardless of the actual validity of the statement.

As the illusion-of-truth effect occurs even without explicit knowledge, it is a direct result of implicit memory. Some participants rated previously heard sentences as true even when they were previously told that they were false. The illusion-of-truth effect shows in some ways the potential dangers of implicit memory as it can lead to unconscious decisions about a statement's veracity.

== Procedural memory ==
A form of implicit memory used every day is called procedural memory. Procedural memory lets us perform some actions (such as writing or riding a bike) even if we are not consciously thinking about it.

In one experiment two groups of people, one composed of amnesic patients with heavily impaired long-term memory, and the other composed by healthy subjects, were asked several times to solve a Tower of Hanoi puzzle (a complex problem-solving game that requires thirty-one steps to complete). The first group showed the same improvements over time as the second group, even if some participants claimed that they didn't even remember having seen the puzzle before. These findings strongly suggest that procedural memory is somewhat independent from declarative memory.

In another experiment two groups of people were given a flavored carbonated drink. The first group was later exposed to motion sickness, and these participants developed a taste aversion against the carbonated drink, even if they were made aware that the drink didn't lead to the motion sickness. This shows that there appears to be an implicit, procedural memory that subconsciously links the sickness and the drink flavor.

It is debated whether implicit attitudes (that is, attitudes people have without being consciously aware of them) belong under the category of implicit memory or if this merely involves a pragmatic approach to asserting knowledge. In some ways, implicit attitudes resemble procedural memory as they rely on an implicit, unconscious piece of knowledge that was previously learned.

=== Declarative and Procedural memory in language acquisition ===
In order to understand the individual references on learning a language on individual adults Morgan-Short et al (2014) designed a study that included seven test sessions in which “cognitive, measures of declarative and procedural learning, intelligence, language training, practice (grammar), artificial language practice, and assessment sessions” were used. In this experiment all participants knew only one language (English). Further results in the experiment demonstrated that language learning abilities are potentially present during declarative and procedural learning. The study showed that “declarative memory was more associated with the rules and syntactic meaning of the words in the early language acquisition process” whereas, procedural memory was associated with the latter stages. This experiment can shed new light about the different outcomes of language acquisition and grammatical development in learners.

== Evidence for the separation of implicit and explicit memory ==
Evidence strongly suggests that implicit memory is largely distinct from explicit memory and operates through a different process in the brain. Recently, interest has been directed towards studying these differences, most notably by studying amnesic patients and the effect of priming.

=== Implicit memory in amnesic patients ===
The strongest evidence that suggests a separation of implicit and explicit memory focuses on studies of amnesic patients. As was previously discussed in the section on procedural memory, amnesic patients showed unimpaired ability to learn tasks and procedures that do not rely on explicit memory. In one study, amnesic patients showed a severely impaired ability in verbal long-term memory, but no impairment in their memory for learning how to solve a certain motor task called a pursuit rotor. Patients showed this improvement over time even while claiming on each occasion to have never seen the puzzle before. This result indicates that the mechanism for long-term declarative memory does not have a similar effect on implicit memory. Furthermore, studies on priming in amnesic patients also reveal the possibility of an intact implicit memory despite a severely impaired explicit memory. For example, amnesic patients and a control group showed similar improvements in word completion as a result of priming, even if they had no memory of being involved in a previous test. That priming occurs without the involvement of explicit memory again suggests that the two types of memory have different functions in the brain.

In amnesia, damage has occurred to the hippocampus, or related structures, and the capacity is lost for one kind of neuroplasticity (LTP in hippocampus) and for one kind of memory. The fact that residual learning abilities are accomplished implicitly could be taken to mean that nothing at all has been lost except the ability to engage in conscious remembering. However, by analogy to the loss of form vision in blindsight, it is suggested here that a specific ability has also been lost in amnesia. What has been lost is the ability to store a particular kind of memory, a kind of memory that is flexible and available to conscious recollection.

The tradition of work with amnesic patients explains why the idea of multiple memory systems led naturally to a consideration of what kind of memory depends on the integrity of the brain structures, including hippocampus, that are damaged in amnesia. In addition, the idea that the hippocampus might be involved in only one kind of memory appeared independently in the animal literature, on the basis of the selective effects of limbic lesions (Gaffan, 1974; Hirsch, 1974; O'Keefe & Nadel, 1978; Olton et al., 1979). The sections that follow suggest that the findings from humans and experimental animals, including rats and monkeys, are now in substantial agreement about the kind of memory that depends specifically on the hippocampus and related structures.

=== Process dissociation method ===
Process dissociation is a framework proposed by L. L. Jacoby as a procedure to separate the contributions of different types of processes to performance of a task. This method uses the 'dissociation' paradigm of comparing performance on two tasks.

Jacoby employed this technique in his false fame experiment. Participants in this experiment were provided a list of names in the first session. In the second session, participants were given one of the two kinds of tasks. In the 'exclusion task', participants were told that none of the names they read in session one belonged to famous people and they should respond "no" when judging fame in the second session. In the 'inclusion task' condition, participants were informed that the names from the first session were famous but obscure and they should respond "yes" for famous if they remember a name from the first session or otherwise know it to be famous. Theoretically, the probability of saying "yes" in the exclusion condition is the probability of the name being remembered only unconsciously. The probability of saying "yes" in the inclusion condition was the probability of a name being remembered either consciously or unconsciously. Comparison of these two yields an estimate of conscious influences.

The process dissociation procedure provides a general framework for separating the influences of automatic processes from the intentional processes and can be applied to a variety of domains. Later, Visser & Merikle also employed the process dissociation method to demonstrate the effects of motivation on conscious and unconscious processes.

=== Double dissociation on explicit and implicit memory ===
The neural components of memory have demonstrated to be extensive in its operating characteristics. In order to obtain more information on the different memory systems that exist within the brain, research done by Gabrieli et al (1995) used the cases of patients with brain injuries associated with the recollection of explicit and implicit memories. This premise led investigators to create different functional neural components that seek to explain the activation of memory (explicit and implicit) in the human brain. (#) (1) The existent possibility of one homogeneous system in the brain in matters of memory performance and that explicit memory has more representability in terms of neural resources than implicit memory. (2) The implicit memory process constitutes a different subsystem from explicit memory, however as these processes differ in the internal organization of its functions, they both share relation on how interrelated they are. Results on patients with traumatic brain injuries demonstrated that the neural architecture of the brain can be separated at the time of studying how the memory systems differ at the time of using “memory recalling visual implicit memory”, “explicit memory for words” and “conceptual implicit memory for words”

=== Other evidence for differences between implicit and explicit memory ===
Besides the study of amnesic patients, other evidence also indicates a separation between implicit and explicit memory. Basic patterns that exist for explicit memory development do not apply to implicit memory, implying that the two are two different processes. Children tested at various increasing ages, in different stages of development, do not exhibit the same increase in performance in implicit memory tasks the way they always do with explicit memory tasks. The same is true for elderly people. Studies show that as people grow older, their performance on explicit memory tasks declines, however their performance on implicit memory tasks does not decline at all.

Neuropsychology has used imaging techniques such as PET (positron emission tomography) and MRI (magnetic resonance imaging) to study brain-injured patients, and has shown that explicit memory relies on the integrity of the medial temporal lobe (rhinal, perirhinal and parahippocampal cortex), the frontal–basal areas and the bilateral functionality of the hippocampus. The amygdala is mainly responsible for the emotional component in the process of information storage (see Gazzaniga, 1999; Mancia, 2000b, 2004, in press), and can modulate both the encoding and the storage of hippocampal-dependent memories (Phelps, 2004). Implicit memory, by contrast, is not conscious and concerns data that can be neither remembered nor verbalized. It presides over the learning of various skills: a) priming, which is the ability of an individual to choose an object to which he has previously been exposed subliminally; b) procedural memory, which concerns cognitive and sensorimotor experiences such as motor skills learning, everyday activities, playing instruments or playing certain sports: c) emotive and affective memory, which concerns emotional experiences, as well as the phantasies and defences linked to the first relations of the child with the environment and in particular with the mother.

Implicit memory does not depend on explicit memory. Notions of unconscious memory are related to the concept of implicit memory (J. Breuer, Z. Freud The Study of Hysteria).

Many experiments have been performed to demonstrate the differences between implicit and explicit memory. One such method of differentiation is revealed through the depth-of-processing effect. In a 1981 study by Jacoby and Dallas, subjects were first given a list of words and asked to engage with them in some way. For some of these words, subjects were asked to interact with the words in a relatively superficial way, such as counting the number of letters in each given word. For one set of words, subjects performed tasks that required elaborative processing (denotation), such as answering questions about a word's meaning. They were then given a test that assessed their ability to recognize whether they had seen the word in the studying part of the experiment. Because depth of processing aids in the explicit memory of a word, subjects showed better memory for the words that required elaborative processing on this test. When implicit memory was tested through flashing words on a screen and asking subjects to identify them, however, the priming effect was extremely similar for the words that involved elaborative processing as compared to the words that did not. This suggests that implicit memory does not rely on depth of processing as explicit memory does.

The same study also tested the effect on memory by priming the words via an auditory test and then testing through visual stimuli. In this case, there was little decline in the priming effect when patients were tested explicitly by merely being asked whether they recognized hearing the word in the first part of the experiment. On the word identification test of implicit memory, however, the priming effect was severely reduced by the change in modality from the studying part to the testing part.

Both implicit and explicit memory experiences can be present in transference, influencing each other just as they do in the normal development of the infantile mind (Siegel, 1999). If the work on implicit memory can facilitate the emergence of phantasies and memories stored in the explicit memory, so the work of reconstruction, which relies on the autobiographic memory, can facilitate the emergence in the transference and in the dreams of the most archaic experiences, with their relevant phantasies and defences, stored in the implicit memory of the patient. This corresponds to Davis's (2001) description of declarative and non-declarative processes in the psychoanalytic perspective.

A later study showed that attempts to interfere with the memory of a list of words significantly impacted subjects' ability to recognize the words in a test of explicit recognition, but the interference did not have a similar effect on the subject's implicit memory of the words. Also, there seems to be no statistical correlation between a person's ability to explicitly remember a list of words and their ability to subconsciously use the priming effect to aid performance in identifying previously seen words in tests of word completion. All of these results strongly indicate that implicit memory not only exists, but exists as its own entity, with its own processes that significantly differ from explicit memory.

One of the key findings from the foregoing research that implies a fundamental difference between implicit and explicit memory is provided by studies that have examined the effects of elaborative processing on these two forms of memory. It is well known that explicit recall and recognition benefit substantially from semantic elaboration during study (e.g., Craik & Tulving, 1975; Jacoby & Craik, 1979). In contrast, the results of several experiments suggest that performance on implicit memory tests does not benefit from elaborative processing relative to nonelaborative processing. This finding was observed initially with a word-identification task, which requires subjects to identify words from extremely brief presentations (Jacoby & Dallas, 1981), and has since been demonstrated with various other implicit memory tests. For example, on a word-completion task, which requires completing fragments of recently presented words and new words (e.g., rea___ for reason), the magnitude of priming effects is comparable after an elaborative study task (e.g., rating the pleasantness of a word) and a nonelaborative study task (e.g., counting the number of vowels in a word; Graf et al., 1982). Similarly, when subjects study linguistic idioms (e.g., sour grapes) and are then given a free association test (e.g., sour—?), they show similar amounts of priming following elaborative and nonelaborative study tasks (Schacter, 1985b). Finally, it has also been demonstrated that elaborative versus nonelaborative processing activities have little or no influence on priming effects in a lexical decision task (Carroll & Kirsner, 1982).

== See also ==
- Explicit memory
- Implicit association test
- Implicit cognition
