= Elizabeth A. Phelps =

Cognitive neuroscientist

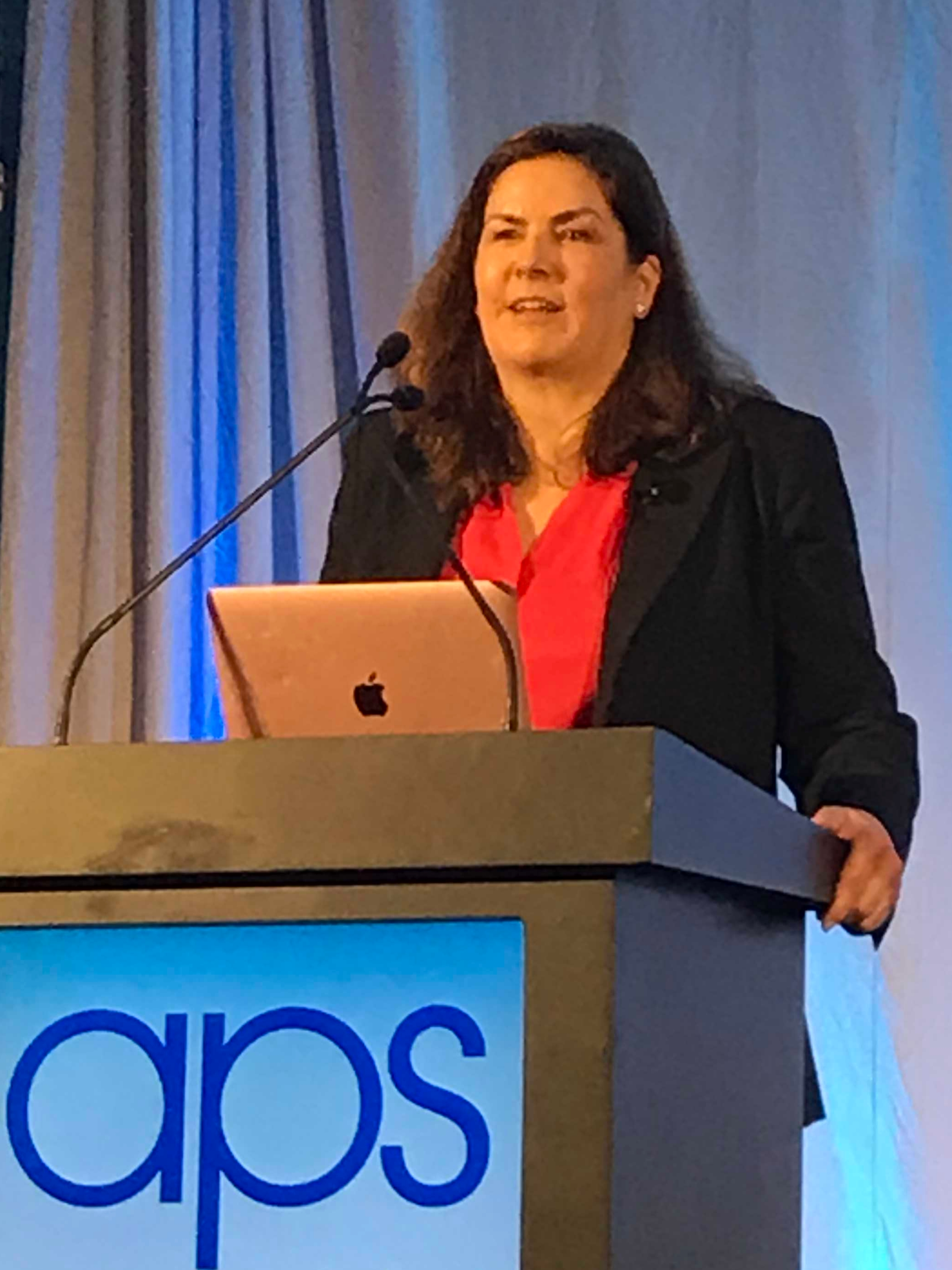
- Phelps in 2019
- Occupation: Professor of Psychology
- Awards: 2014 Distinguished Scholar Award; 2019 William James Award; 2021 George Miller Award; 2023 Goldman-Rakic Award; 2025 APS Mentor Award

Academic background
- Education: Ohio Wesleyan University; Princeton University

Elizabeth Anya Phelps is the Pershing Square Professor of Human Neuroscience at Harvard University in the Department of Psychology. She is known for her research on uncovering how the human brain processes emotion and its influence on learning, memory and decision making. She was the recipient of the Social and Affective Neuroscience Society Distinguished Scholar Award, the George Miller Award from the Cognitive Neuroscience Society, the Goldman-Rakic Award for Outstanding Achievement in Cognitive Neuroscience, and the William James Award and Mentor Award from the Association for Psychological Science.

Phelps is a past-president of the Association for Psychological Science, past-president of the Society for NeuroEconomics, past-president of the Social and Affective Neuroscience Society, and a founding board member of the Society for Neuroethics. She is a member of the American Academy of Arts and Sciences and a fellow of the Society of Experimental Psychologists and American Association for the Advancement of Science.

== Biography ==
Phelps was born in Washington DC. She attended college at Ohio Wesleyan University and earned a bachelor's degree in 1984, with a major in psychology and a minor in Philosophy. As a student athlete in track and field, Phelps was named three times as an All-America selection in the heptathlon. She has one daughter, Evangeline Grace Phelps.

Subsequently, Phelps went to Princeton University where she received a M.A. in 1986 and Ph.D. in 1989 in Psychology, working under the supervision of William Hirst and Marcia K. Johnson. After graduation she worked as a research scientist at Dartmouth Medical School, the New School of Social Research and at New York University.

Phelps joined the faculty at Harvard University in 2018. Previously she had worked at NYU obtaining the rank of Full Professor in 2004 and Yale University as an Assistant and associate professor of psychology (1992–1999).

Phelps has served on the board of directors of the APS and as the editor of the journal Emotion.

In 2026, Phelps was elected to the National Academy of Sciences.

== Research ==
Phelps's research focuses on how our emotions affect the way brain systems function in relation to memory and learning. She aims to figure out how emotions make certain learning experiences stick with us. Her research centers around four topics: incorporating animal models of emotional learning to explain human behavior, influence of emotion on episodic memory, impact of emotion on perception, attention, and expression, and explaining social behavior, decision making, and economics using basic mechanisms of emotional learning.

In an interview with Ira Flatow of Science Friday with NPR News, Phelps explained her study on extinction of memory, and how she hopes it can be used to treat people with fearful memories (e.g., phobias, PTSD, anxiety disorders). Phelps paired colored squares and mild shocks to participants' wrist to create a fear memory. She then examined the extinction of the fear memory by incorporating extinction training (showing the colored square without shocks) to one group of participants when the memory was vulnerable, and observed that the group no longer showed signs of fear. The second group received the same extinction training but outside of the memory vulnerability window, and still expressed fear. Repeated extinction training helps remove the fearful memory.

In another study Phelps examined flashbulb memories using functional magnetic resonance imaging. She observed 24 participants as they recalled their 9/11 experiences. As participants recalled the attacks, the fMRI displayed their amygdala lighting up, showing that the amygdala associated with emotional memories.

== Representative publications ==
- Anderson, A. K., & Phelps, E. A. (2001). Lesions of the human amygdala impair enhanced perception of emotionally salient events. Nature, 411(6835), 305–309.
- Phelps, E. A. (2006). Emotion and cognition: insights from studies of the human amygdala. Annual Review of Psychology, 57, 27–53.
- Phelps, E. A., & LeDoux, J. E. (2005). Contributions of the amygdala to emotion processing: from animal models to human behavior. Neuron, 48(2), 175–187.
- Phelps, E. A., O'Connor, K. J., Cunningham, W. A., Funayama, E. S., Gatenby, J. C., Gore, J. C., & Banaji, M. R. (2000). Performance on indirect measures of race evaluation predicts amygdala activation. Journal of Cognitive Neuroscience, 12(5), 729–738.
