= Timothy A. Salthouse =

American psychologist

Timothy A. Salthouse is the Brown-Forman professor of Psychology in the Department of Psychology at the University of Virginia where he leads the Cognitive Aging Laboratory.

== Education ==
In 1974, Salthouse received his PhD from the University of Michigan.

== Research ==
At the Cognitive Aging Laboratory, a major focus is the Virginia Cognitive Aging Project (VCAP), one of the largest longitudinal assessments of cognitive aging.

In his research, Salthouse helped discover that the first indicators of cognitive decline (regarding brain speed, reasoning, and visual problem-solving ability) start in one's late 20s.

== Honors ==
Salthouse is a Fellow of the American Psychological Association, the Association for Psychological Science, the American Association for the Advancement of Science and other organisations.

His awards include the William James Fellow Award from the Association for Psychological Science in 1998 and the Lifetime Achievement Award of the International Society for Intelligence Research in 2012.

== Published works ==
Salthouse has authored or co-authored and published over 200 articles in academic journals. His h-index according to Google Scholar is 116.

=== Selected books ===
- Salthouse, Timothy (1982). Adult cognition: An experimental psychology of human aging. New York: Springer Science+Business Media. ISBN 978-0-387-90728-4.
- Salthouse, Timothy (1985). A theory of cognitive aging. Amsterdam: North-Holland. ISBN 978-0-444-87827-4.
- Salthouse, Timothy (1991). Theoretical perspectives on cognitive aging. Hillsdale, N.J: Taylor & Francis. ISBN 978-0-8058-0424-9.
- Salthouse, Timothy (1992). Mechanisms of age-cognition relations in adulthood. Hillsdale, New Jersey: L. Taylor & Francis. ISBN 978-0-8058-1129-2.
- Salthouse, Timothy (2010). Major issues in cognitive aging. New York: Oxford University Press. ISBN 978-0-19-537215-1.
