= Stephen Lindsay =

D. Stephen Lindsay is a cognitive psychologist in the field of memory, and a professor of psychology at the University of Victoria (UVic), British Columbia. He received his PhD from Princeton University in 1987.

Lindsay's research is focused on human memory performance, the factors and processes that may lead to false memories, incorrect beliefs about past experiences and memory distortions, and the application of these areas to other fields, such as eyewitness memory and its effect on decisions in criminal investigation, and therapy in the context of the debate over recovered memories.

Lindsay has achieved recognition in his field. He has published scores of journal articles, edited or co-edited several books and contributed chapters to many edited volumes. He was awarded the American Psychological Association Young Investigator Award in Experimental Psychology in 1995, served as Editor in Chief of the Journal of Experimental Psychology: General from 2001 to 2007, became a Fellow of the Association for Psychological Science in 2005, received the University of Victoria Faculty of Social Science's Teaching Excellence award in 2006, and is currently Editor in Chief of Psychological Science.

Lindsay became a faculty member at UVic in 1991, previously teaching at Williams College and completing a post-doctoral fellowship with Larry Jacoby at McMaster University.

== Education ==
Lindsay graduated from Reed College in 1981 with a BA in psychology. After a brief period working as a construction labourer in Anchorage, Alaska, he began postgraduate study at Princeton in 1983; his doctoral work was supervised by well-known memory researcher Marcia Johnson. In his dissertation he initially set out to investigate the impact of imagining contrary-to-truth hiding places on children's memory for the actual spatial location of objects.

He became interested in Johnson's ongoing work on reality monitoring (the process of distinguishing between memories of external, physically experienced events versus those originating from internal sources such as imagination and thought). This led to work on the broader issues of source monitoring - how people decide where a given memory comes from, whether from own experience, a television broadcast, a story told by a friend etc. His final dissertation focused on source similarity - how alike two potential sources of a memory are - as a factor in increasing the likelihood of a source monitoring error.

== Research ==
Lindsay's early research focused on source monitoring: what people do when they try to identify the origins of memories, knowledge and beliefs. With Marcia Johnson and other memory researchers, he was centrally involved in developing the source monitoring framework, a model of the processes involved in source-monitoring decisions. This body of work is cited extensively, had an impact on how memory processes are understood and paved the way for further research on false memories, memory distortion and the nature of metagcognitive judgments. He also investigated what factors could impact the accuracy and confidence of such judgments. His current research on memory performance includes work on improving recognition memory sensitivity.

Lindsay became interested in memory errors partially due to the recovered memory debate, and has published work about the consequences of recovered memory therapy. and the nature and causes of recovered memory experiences. He has also studied the application of the psychology of memory to eyewitness testimony for many years, beginning with the implications of the source-monitoring framework for the accuracy of eyewitness evidence. His current work related to eyewitness testimony includes research on the influence of (often inaccurate) eyewitness evidence on investigators' decisions about the guilt of suspects.
