= Janellen Huttenlocher =

American psychologist (1932–2016)

- Born: February 17, 1932; Buffalo, New York, U.S.
- Died: November 20, 2016 (aged 84); Chicago, Illinois, U.S.
- Education: University of Buffalo, Harvard University
- Occupations: Professor of Psychology, University of Chicago
- Spouse: Peter Huttenlocher
- Children: 3, including Anna Huttenlocher

Janellen Huttenlocher (February 17, 1932 – November 20, 2016) was a psychologist and professor known for her research in the field of the child's environment in the development of cognitive skills. She was the William S. Gray Professor Emeritus in Psychology at the University of Chicago at the time of her death.

Huttenlocher was a recipient of the Association for Psychological Science William James Fellow Award in 2013, and the Society for Research in Child Development Award for Distinguished Scientific Contributions to Child Development in 2009. She was honored with the APA Award for Distinguished Scientific Contributions to Psychology in 2008 for having "greatly expanded scientific knowledge about cognition and its development in domains as varied as language, spatial cognition, quantitative thought, and memory."

== Biography ==
Huttenlocher (née Burns) was born in Buffalo, New York. She received her B.A. at the University of Buffalo in 1953, married her husband Peter Huttenlocher in 1954, and had three children. Huttenlocher attended Harvard University for her graduate studies in Psychology, completing her M.A. in 1958 and Ph.D in 1960 under the supervision of Professor Frederick Mosteller. She completed postdoctoral training at Harvard University in the 1960s in the midst of the cognitive revolution. Huttenlocher joined the faculty of the Department of Psychology at the University of Chicago in 1974, after teaching at Teachers College, Columbia University.

== Research ==
Huttenlocher co-authored two books and over 100 research articles on a range of topics including language development, spatial reasoning, memory, and quantitative development. Her book Making space: The development of spatial representation and reasoning, co-authored with Nora Newcombe, provided a comprehensive account of how children actively construct mental models of spatial environments. Her second book Quantitative development in infancy and early childhood, co-authored with Kelly Mix and Susan Levine, focused on how children develop numerical concepts and quantitative reasoning skills.

Huttenlocher was well known for her research on the verbal behavior of parents and teachers in relation to children's language development, focusing on the effects of early input on children's vocabulary growth and their learning of grammar (syntax).

== Representative publications ==
- Huttenlocher, J. (1968). Constructing spatial images. Psychological Review, 75(6), 550-560.
- Huttenlocher, J. (1964). Children's language: Word-phrase relationship. Science, 143(3603), 264-265.
- Huttenlocher, J., Haight, W., Bryk, A., Seltzer, M., & Lyons, T. (1991). Early vocabulary growth: Relation to language input and gender. Developmental Psychology, 27(2), 236-248.
- Huttenlocher, J., Hedges, L. V., & Duncan, S. (1991). Categories and particulars. Psychological Review, 98(3), 352-376.
- Huttenlocher, J., Vasilyeva, M., Cymerman, E., & Levine, S. (2002). Language input and child syntax. Cognitive psychology, 45(3), 337-374.
- Huttenlocher, J., Waterfall, H., Vasilyeva, M., Vevea, J., & Hedges, L. V. (2010). Sources of variability in children’s language growth. Cognitive Psychology, 61(4), 343-365.
