= Elizabeth Tipton =

American statistician

Elizabeth Tipton is an American statistician whose research focuses on causal inference from meta-analysis and robust variance estimation, especially for applications of social statistics in education and behavior. She is a professor of statistics and data science at Northwestern University, where she also holds a courtesy professorship in human development and social policy in the Northwestern School of Education and Social Policy, a fellow of the Institute for Policy Research, and co-director of the Statistics for Evidence-Based Policy and Practice Center.

== Education and career ==
Tipton majored in mathematics at Transylvania University in Kentucky, US, graduating in 2001. Returning to graduate study, she earned a master's degree in sociology from the University of Chicago in 2005, and a Ph.D. in statistics at Northwestern University in 2011. Her doctoral dissertation, Essays on Generalizing from Experiments, was supervised by Larry V. Hedges.

She became an assistant professor of applied statistics in Teachers College, Columbia University in 2011, and was tenured there as an associate professor in 2017. She returned to Northwestern in 2018 as an associate professor of statistics and faculty fellow in the Institute for Policy Research in 2018. In 2019, the Statistics for Evidence-Based Policy and Practice (STEPP) Center was founded in the Institute for Policy Research, and she became one of two founding co-directors. She was promoted to full professor in 2023.

== Recognition ==
Tipton was the 2017 recipient of the Anne Anastasi Distinguished Early Career Award of the American Psychological Association and the 2020 recipient of the Frederick Mosteller Award of the Campbell Collaboration.

In 2024, she was named a Fellow of the American Educational Research Association and a Fellow of the American Statistical Association. In 2025, she was elected as a member in the National Academy of Education.
