= Peter Huttenlocher =

German-American neurologist (1931–2013)

Peter Richard Huttenlocher
- Born: February 23, 1931; Oberlahnstein bei Kolbenz
- Died: August 15, 2013 (aged 82); Chicago
- Education: University of Buffalo
- Known for: Development of the brain in infants
- Spouse: Janellen Huttenlocher (1932–2013)
- Children: 3, including Anna Huttenlocher
- Scientific career
- Fields: Neurology, neuroscience
- Workplaces: Harvard Medical School; Yale School of Medicine; University of Chicago Pritzker School of Medicine

Peter Richard Huttenlocher (February 23, 1931 – August 15, 2013) was a German-American pediatric neurologist and neuroscientist who discovered how the brain develops in children. He is considered to be one of the fathers of developmental cognitive neuroscience.

== Work ==
Huttenlocher discovered that synapses are created in the first few months of a child's development, and then "pruned", by examining the brains of about 50 people, mostly infants and young children who had died unexpectedly, but also a few adults, one of them age 90. Using an electron microscope to count image samples of material, and then manually counting the synapses, he showed that synaptic density was low at birth, about 2,500 connections per neuron. It increased rapidly to levels 50 to 60 percent above adult levels, and then gradually declined, falling to typical adult values.

He had originally intended to study defective parts of the brain, but found that: "Paradoxically, in our early studies, the findings in the normal population were more interesting than the abnormal population." The individuals with intellectual disability he studied were discovered to have the same number of synapses as those without, but of a different shape.

This "pruning" mechanism removes redundant connections in the brain. Huttenlocher found that in individuals with intellectual disabilities, this mechanism works differently.

Huttenlocher also became an early authority on Reye's syndrome, and in 1987 launched the first clinic in the United States for children with tuberous sclerosis.

His findings have influenced government policy and parents' priorities, putting more emphasis on the importance of early education. He correlated the acquisition of skills and the development of the parts of the brain associated with them.

== Personal life ==
Huttenlocher was born in Oberlahnstein bei Koblenz on February 23, 1931. His parents became divorced when he was young, and his mother, Else, an opera singer, refused to join the Nazi Party and fled to the United States in 1937. Peter and his brothers were raised by their father, Richard, who was a chemist. The experience of growing up under Nazism contributed to his lifelong interest in ethics and morality.

He travelled in 1949 to the United States with his older brother Dieter to meet his mother, and decided to stay. He met his future wife Janellen Huttenlocher (née Burns) (February 17, 1932 – November 20, 2016) at the University of Buffalo in New York, from where he graduated summa cum laude in philosophy in 1953. He married Janellen a year later, and moved with her to Harvard University, where she obtained a Phd in Psychology and he his MD, magna cum laude, from Harvard Medical School in 1957. After an internship at Harvard's Peter Bent Brigham Hospital, he completed his residency at Boston Children's Hospital and Massachusetts General Hospital (MGH), followed by research fellowships at the National Institutes of Health and MGH. He was an assistant professor in pediatric neurology at Harvard from 1964 to 1966, followed by eight years at Yale School of Medicine. In 1974, he moved with Janellen to the University of Chicago Pritzker School of Medicine as a professor of pediatrics, adding neurology in 1976. He stayed for almost 30 years, the remainder of his career, shifting to emeritus status in 2003.

Huttenlocher enjoyed classical music, and played the flute, as well as gardening and baking.

He died of pneumonia and complications of Parkinson's disease on August 15, 2013, in Chicago.

== Publications ==
He published more than 80 papers on a wide variety of topics related to the development of the brain in children. As well as a number of book chapters, he published in 2002 Neural Plasticity: The Effects of Environment on the Development of the Cerebral Cortex.

His 1976 description of a severe congenital recessive disorder involving seizures and liver dysfunction contributed to the discovery of Alpers–Huttenlocher syndrome, today recognized as a type of mitochondrial DNA depletion disorder.
