= Anna Huttenlocher =

American physician

- Parent(s): Peter Huttenlocher (father); Janellen Huttenlocher (mother)

Academic background
- Education: BA, Oberlin College; MD, Harvard Medical School
- Website: mmi.wisc.edu/staff/huttenlocher-anna/

Anna Huttenlocher is an American cell biologist and physician-scientist known for her work in cell migration and wound healing.

== Early life and education ==
Huttenlocher was born to two academic parents; her father, Peter, was a pediatric neurologist and her mother, Janellen, was a psychologist. She completed her Bachelor of Science degree at Oberlin College and her medical degree from Harvard Medical School. Following Harvard, she completed her training at Boston Children's Hospital and the University of California, San Francisco.

== Career ==
Huttenlocher joined the faculty at the University of Wisconsin–Madison (UW-M) in 1999 with a joint appointment in the Departments of Pediatrics and Pharmacology, and as an associate director of the Medical Scientist Training Program (MSTP). In this role, Huttenlocher's research has defined cellular and molecular mechanisms that regulate cell migration and identified basic adhesive mechanisms that regulate cell migration and leukocyte chemotaxis. By 2005, her research team had identified a novel pathway that turned out to be critical for cell migration and chemotaxis, involving intracellular proteolysis by the calcium-dependent protease calpain. Her laboratory was also the first to document reverse migration of neutrophils away from sites of injury or inflammation. In 2011 her group reported the first redox sensor that mediates leukocyte attraction to wounds. In 2005 she was elected a member of the American Society for Clinical Investigation. Huttenlocher was promoted to Professor with tenure in 2008 and was the recipient of the Graduate School’s H.I. Romnes Fellowship award. She also received the Burroughs-Wellcome Fund’s Clinical Scientist Award in Translational Research for her project "Diagnosis and Treatment of Autoinflammatory Disease." Huttenlocher was the recipient of a 2011 WARF Kellett Mid-Career Award. Until 2023 she conducted this work while maintaining an active clinical practice as a pediatric rheumatologist.

In 2012, Huttenlocher was appointed as Director of the UW-Madison MD-PhD training program (MSTP), succeeding Deane Mosher. She was active in that role for over ten years. During that time she was also elected into the Association of American Physicians. In 2015 Dr. Huttenlocher was inducted as a Member of the National Academy of Medicine "for her pioneering studies of cell migration and alterations of cell migration in human diseases." In 2017, Huttenlocher was awarded a UW2020 grant to support her project "Engineering leukocytes generated from human iPS cells to treat human disease." At the same time, she was also elected a Fellow of the American Society for Cell Biology.

In May 2020, Huttenlocher was named the Anna Ruth Brummett Professor of Pediatrics and Medical Microbiology and Immunology Chair in honor of her "major contributions to the advancement of knowledge." The following year, she was part of a large team of researchers from the University of Wisconsin Carbone Cancer Center recognized with the Society for the Immunotherapy of Cancer’s Team Science Award for "long-standing contribution to the field of cancer immunotherapy over the past 35 years." Huttenlocher's recent research projects include "Cell migration and wound repair" and "Imaging immunometabolism in live animals during host defense."

In 2023, Huttenlocher published the book "From Loss to Memory: Behind the Discovery of Synaptic Pruning". It describes the discovery of synaptic pruning and its current relevance to early learning, autism, schizophrenia and Alzheimer's disease. The book centers on the intriguing life story of the discoverer of synaptic pruning, her father Peter Huttenlocher, and also discusses the physician-scientist career path.
