= Tartu College =

Student residence, and Estonian culture centre in Ontario

Coordinates: 43°40′02″N 79°24′09″W

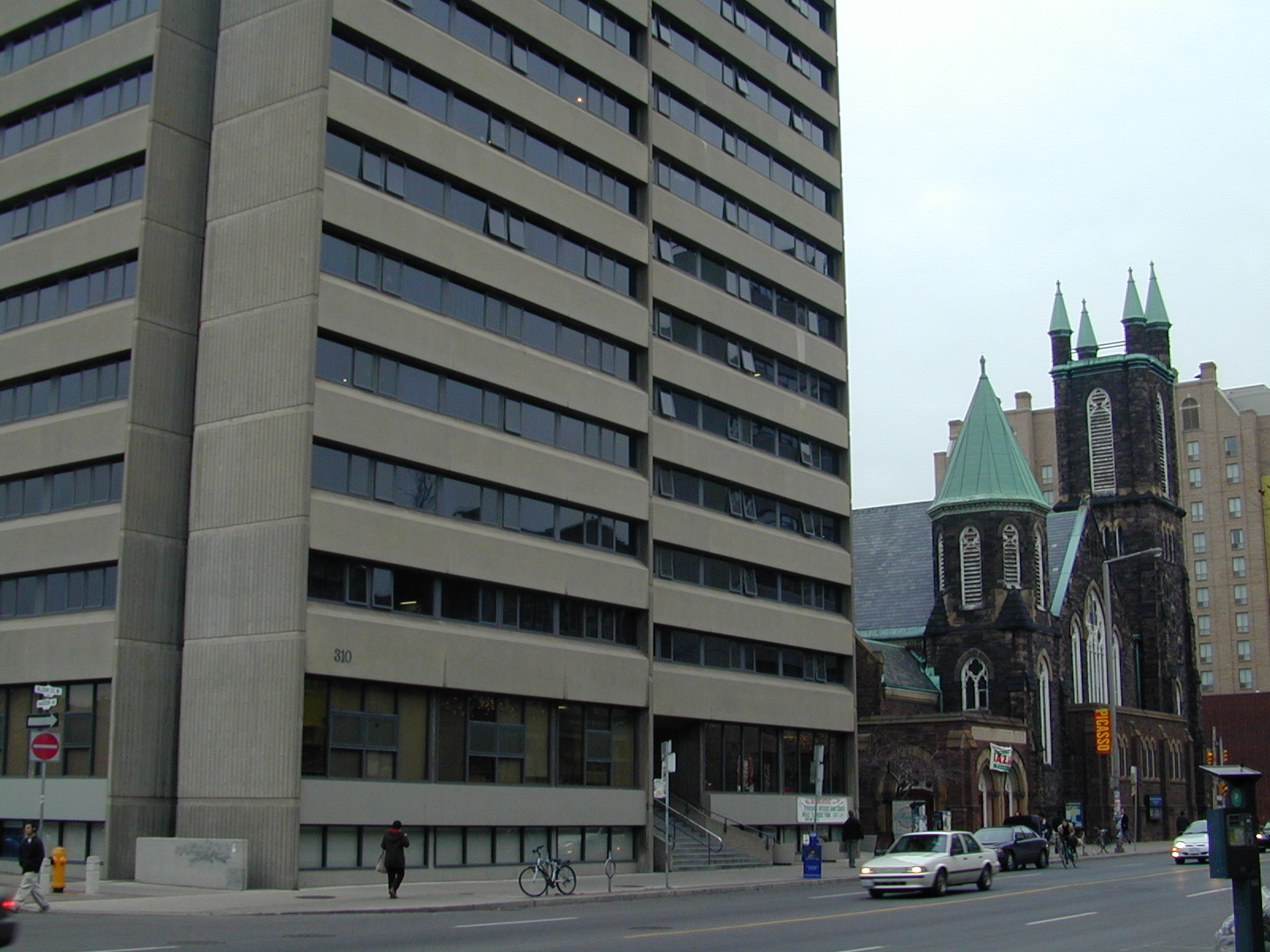
Tartu College

Tartu College is a not for profit student residence on the north side of Bloor Street West, just east of Madison Avenue, in Toronto, Ontario, Canada. Most of its residents are students of the University of Toronto.

Tartu College was built in 1970, two years after its sister building, the David A. Croll Apartments (originally Rochdale College), was built a block away on the opposite side of the street in 1968. Both buildings were designed by architects Elmar Tampõld and John Wells (who had earlier constructed the Charles Street apartments at Bay Street and Bloor Street). Like the Rochdale building, it is an example of brutalist architectural principles, and serves as a nostalgic reminder of the 1960s culture during which both buildings emerged.

It was named after the city of Tartu, Estonia, and was originally built as an undergraduate student co-op with a library, archive, and study centre serving the Estonian-Canadian community.

== Tartu Institute ==
Tartu College operates the Tartu Institute, which was established on 9 February 1971. The institute deals mostly with activities related to Estonian diaspora in Canada.
