= Olev Träss =

Estonian chemist

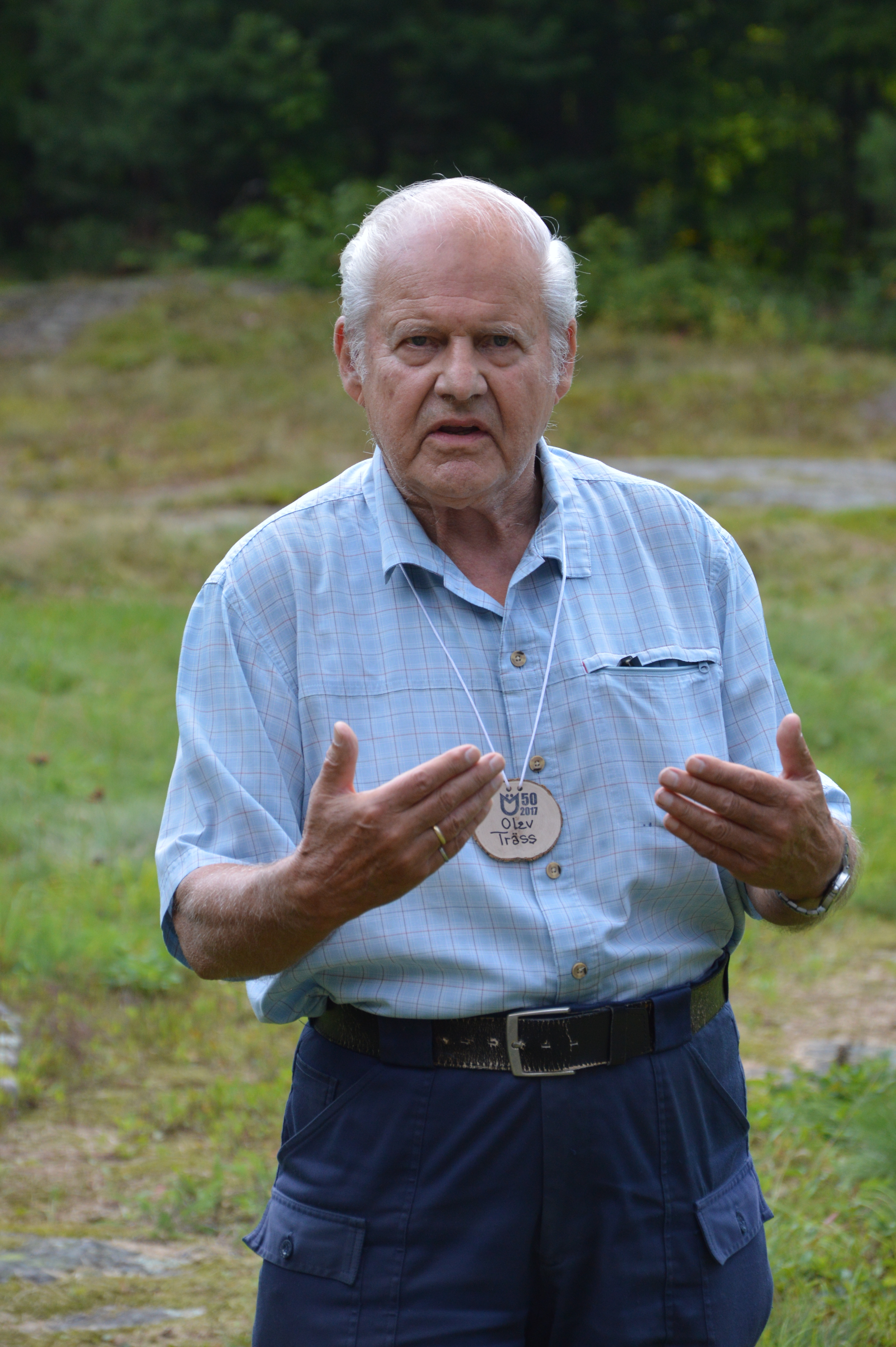
Olev Träss

Olev Träss (born 1931 in Tartu) is an Estonian chemist who lives in Canada. He is a promoter of Estonian community in Canada.

He has graduated from Massachusetts Institute of Technology. He joined the University of Toronto's Department of Chemical Engineering and Applied Chemistry in 1958, was made full professor within about a decade, and retired in 1995. At present he is listed as Professor Emeritus.

He is one of the founders of Tartu Institute (:et) in Toronto, and also its president. He is also one of the founder of Kotkajärv Forest University (:et).

In 2007 he was awarded with Order of the White Star, IV class.

In 2021 he received Aino Järvesoo prize for his contribution to sustaining and developing Estonian culture and language abroad.
