= Society for Experimental Psychology and Cognitive Science =

The Society for Experimental Psychology and Cognitive Science (SEPCS) (also known as American Psychological Association Division 3; formerly known as the Division of Experimental Psychology and the Division for Theoretical-Experimental Psychology) is a scholarly organization of psychologists in the principal area of general experimental psychology. The goals of this society are to promote, advance, and increase inclusion and exchange of ideas among the scholars in the many subfields of experimental psychology (including but not limited to behavior analysis, psychophysics, comparative, social, developmental, bio/physiological/neuropsychology/behavioral neuroscience, and the many topic areas of cognitive psychology, such as the study of memory, attention, language, intelligence, decision making, and so forth), both in basic and applied research. The society focuses on supporting research through advocacy, training and education, public policy, and outreach. It engages in a wide variety of service work, including leadership in the American Psychological Association's governance.

== Membership ==
There are several memberships that one can have in the SEPCS, including:

- Student Affiliate
- Member
- Professional Affiliate
- Lifetime Status Member

Members in the SEPCS may be APA members or fellows who affiliate with Division 3; however, one can join the SEPCS without being a member of APA.

== History ==
When the APA was founded in 1892 by G. Stanley Hall, it was itself a small society of experimental psychologists. Given the rapid growth and breadth of the organization, a new division structure for APA was introduced in 1944, with specialty areas organized under the APA umbrella. Among the 19 charter divisions, General Psychology was Division 1, Teaching was Division 2, and Theoretical-Experimental Psychology was Division 3. Professor Edward C. Tolman of Berkeley, CA was the first Chairman (President) of the division. Charter Division 6 was Physiological and Comparative Psychology, but would merge into Division 3 (renamed the Division of Experimental Psychology) in 1949. Division 6 would re-emerge as a separate division in 1964, although most members of Division 6 (which was renamed the Society for Behavioral Neuroscience and Comparative Psychology in 2015, the same year that Division 3 adopted its current name) remain affiliated also with Division 3.

The list of scholars who have served as officers of Division 3 reflects a virtual "who's who" of psychology. For example, the following psychologists (listed in chronological order) have been elected to lead Division 3 as President (or Chairman in 1945): Edward C. Tolman, Edwin Ray Guthrie, Clarence H. Graham, Clark L. Hull & Frank A. Beach, B.F. Skinner & WJ Brogden, Harry Harlow (1950), Harold H. Schlosberg, Neal E. Miller, Donald O. Hebb, James J. Gibson, Frank A. Geldard, Carl Pfaffmann, Judson S. Brown, William Kaye Estes. Benton J. Underwood (1960), David A. Grant, WD Neff, Lorrin A. Riggs, Lyle V. Jones, Howard H. Kendler, Charles N. Cofer, Richard Soloman, Delos D. Wickens, Arthur W. Melton, Leo J. Postman (1970) James E. Deese, Frank W. Finger, James J. Jenkins, Richard C. Atkinson, Wendell Garner, Gordon H. Bower, Bert F Green, Jr., Frank A. Logan, George Mandler, G. Robert Give, Roger N. Shepard (1980), William Bevan, James Greeno, Julian Hochberg, Robert A. Rescorla, Henry C. Ellis, Herschel W. Liebowitz, Russell M. Church, Elizabeth Loftus, Sam Glucksberg, Stuart H. Hulse (1990), Lyle E. Bourne, Jr., J. Bruce Overmier, Walter Kintsch, Judith P. Goggin, Neal F. Johnson, Geoffrey Keppel, Vincent M. LoLordo, Harry Bahrick, Henry L. Roedigger III (2000), Douglas L. Nelson, Morton Ann Gershbacher, David A. Balota, Randall W. Engle, Alice F. Healy, Thomas R. Zentall, Howard Egeth, Edward Wasserman, Nelson Cowan, Ralph Miller, Jeremy Wolfe (2010), Karen Hollis, Mark A. McDaniel, Nancy Dess, David A. Washburn, Leah Light, Anne Cleary, Jonathon Crystal, Frank Farley, Stephen Goldinger (2020), Stephen J. Ceci, Valerie F. Reyna, Kristi Mulhaup. Professor Elizabeth F. Loftus, who presided over the division's 1988 annual meeting, was the first woman elected to the office.

== Awards ==
Lifetime Achievement Award

The award will honor an individual who has made long-lasting and distinguished theoretical and/or empirical contributions to basic research in experimental psychology. The awardee will receive a plaque and will be invited to present an address at the next APA convention.

Recipients of the Society for Experimental Psychology and Cognitive Sciences Lifetime Achievement Award

2021: Alice F. Healey, PhD

2020: Nelson Cowan, PhD

2019: Harry Bahrick, PhD

2018: Michael I. Posner, PhD

2017: Anne Treisman, PhD and Morton Ann Gernschbacher, PhD

2016: Henry L. "Roddy" Roediger III, PhD & Duane M. Rumbaugh, PhD

2015: Larry L. Jacoby, PhD

2014: Keith Rayner, PhD

2013: Randall W. Engle, PhD

New Investigator Award

Since 1995, Division 3 has presented awards to honor outstanding new investigators. Each year the editors of each of the five sections of the Journal of Experimental Psychology are asked to nominate individuals based on the editors’ judgment of the most outstanding empirical papers published or accepted during that year that were authored by a new scholar (i.e., no more than three years post-PhD). The awards committee then makes recommendations to the Division 3 executive board for final approval. Typically, but not always, there is one winner from each journal.

== Publications ==
SEPCS publishes a bi-annual newsletter, The Experimental Psychology Bulletin, which encompasses member news, and recent awards, amongst others.

The five flagship Journals of Experimental Psychology of the society, each published by the APA:

- Journal of Experimental Psychology: Animal Learning and Cognition
- Journal of Experimental Psychology: Applied
- Journal of Experimental Psychology: General
- Journal of Experimental Psychology: Learning, Memory, and Cognition
- Journal of Experimental Psychology: Human Perception and Performance
