= Isabel Gauthier =

Canadian neuroscientist

- Education: Yale University
- Scientific career
- Fields: Cognitive neuroscience
- Workplaces: Vanderbilt University
- Thesis: (1998)
- Doctoral advisor: Michael J. Tarr

Isabel Gauthier is a cognitive neuroscientist, and the David K. Wilson Professor of Psychology and head of the Object Perception Lab at Vanderbilt University’s Department of Psychology. In 2000, with the support of the James S. McDonnell Foundation, she founded the Perceptual Expertise Network (PEN), which now comprises over ten labs based across North America. In 2006 PEN became part of the NSF-funded Temporal Dynamics of Learning Center (TDLC).

== Awards and recognition ==
Gauthier has received the Young Investigator Award, Cognitive Neuroscience Society (2002), the APA Distinguished Scientific Award for Early Career Contribution to Psychology in the area of Behavioral/Cognitive Neuroscience (2003) and the Troland research award from the National Academy of Sciences "for seminal experiments on the role of visual expertise in the recognition of complex objects including faces and for exploration of brain areas activated by this recognition." (2008). She was elected Fellow of the Association for Psychological Science (2010). In 2012, Gauthier was elected Fellow of the Society of Experimental Psychologists. In 2015, she was named "SEC professor of the year" by the Southeastern Conference. In 2021 Gauthier received the Psychonomic Society Mid-Career award.

Beginning in 2011, Gauthier is chief editor of the Journal of Experimental Psychology: General, where she introduced a brief report format and made report of effect sizes and consideration of power an editorial priority. Since 2016, she is chief editor of the Journal of Experimental Psychology: Human Perception and Performance, where she started a second term in 2023.

== Biography ==
Gauthier acquired her PhD at Yale University (1993–1998). Her dissertation Dissecting face recognition: The role of expertise and level of categorization in object recognition was conducted under the supervision of Michael J, Tarr. She held post-doctoral positions at Yale and MIT before joining the faculty of Vanderbilt University in 1999.

== Research ==
Gauthier has researched many topics involved in perception, with a focus on the role of perceptual expertise in category-specific effects in domains such as faces, letters or musical notation. She incorporates different techniques to study these topics, including functional magnetic resonance imaging (fMRI), event-related potentials (ERP), and behavioral training studies using novel objects (e.g., Greebles, YUFOs, Ziggerins).

One brain area frequently investigated by Gauthier and colleagues using fMRI is the fusiform face area (FFA). The FFA is believed to play an important role in face recognition, but Gauthier’s research has examined the role that FFA may play in the expert perception of non-face objects, such as cars in car experts.

Gauthier's research has a current h-index = 66 as of September 2021, according to Google Scholar), see Google Scholar page

== Representative papers ==
- Chua, K. W., & Gauthier, I. (2020). Domain-specific experience determines individual differences in holistic processing. Journal of Experimental Psychology: General, 149(1), 31.
- Gauthier, I., Skudlarski, P., Gore, J. C., & Anderson, A. W. (2000). Expertise for cars and birds recruits brain areas involved in face recognition. Nature Neuroscience, 3(2), 191–197.
- Gauthier, I., & Tarr, M. J. (1997). Becoming a “Greeble” expert: Exploring mechanisms for face recognition. Vision Research, 37(12), 1673–1682.
- Gauthier, I., Tarr, M. J., Anderson, A. W., Skudlarski, P., & Gore, J. C. (1999). Activation of the middle fusiform'face area'increases with expertise in recognizing novel objects. Nature Neuroscience, 2(6), 568–573.
- Gauthier, I., Tarr, M. J., Moylan, J., Skudlarski, P., Gore, J. C., & Anderson, A. W. (2000). The fusiform “face area” is part of a network that processes faces at the individual level. Journal of Cognitive Neuroscience, 12(3), 495–504.
- Richler, J. J., Tomarken, A. J., Sunday, M. A., Vickery, T. J., Ryan, K. F., Floyd, R. J., ... & Gauthier, I. (2019). Individual differences in object recognition. Psychological Review, 126(2), 226.
