= Deanna Barch =

American psychologist and professor

- Born: St. Louis, Missouri
- Spouse: Todd Braver
- Awards: Atkinson Prize in Psychological and Cognitive Sciences (2026)

Academic background
- Education: BA, 1987, Northwestern University; MA, 1991, PhD, 1993, clinical psychology, University of Illinois Urbana-Champaign
- Thesis: Communication disorder and language production in schizophrenia (1993)

Academic work
- Institutions: Washington University in St. Louis

Deanna Marie Barch is an American psychologist. She is a chair and professor of Psychological and Brain Sciences and the Gregory B. Couch Professor of Psychiatry at Washington University in St. Louis. Her research includes disorders such as schizophrenia, depression, cognitive and language deficits. She also focuses on behavioral, pharmacological, and neuroimaging studies with normal and clinical populations. Barch is a deputy editor at Biological Psychiatry. She previously served as editor-in-chief of Cognitive, Affective, & Behavioral Neuroscience.

== Early life and education ==
Barch was born and raised in St. Louis, Missouri. Growing up, she attended Parkway Central High School where she was a school newspaper editor and on the drill team. As a senior in 1983, she received a Corporate Merit Scholarship to attend either the University of Virginia or Northwestern University and major in child psychology. Barch received her Bachelor of Arts in psychology from Northwestern University in 1987 and her Master's degree and PhD in clinical psychology from the University of Illinois Urbana-Champaign. Upon completing her PhD, Barch completed an internship and three-year postdoctoral fellowship in clinical psychology at the University of Pittsburgh School of Medicine under the guidance of Jonathan D. Cohen. While Barch completed her clinical internship in Pittsburgh, she worked as a therapist with mentally ill patients. However, she chose to not pursue it as a full-time career in order to continue her research aspirations.

== Career ==
Upon completing her internship and three-year postdoctoral fellowship, Barch and her husband Todd Braver received assistant professor positions at the Washington University in St. Louis Department of Psychology in 1998. She was shortly thereafter promoted to the rank of associate professor of psychology in Arts & Sciences. In this role, Barch was a recipient of the 2002 Distinguished Scientific Award for Early Career Contributions to Psychology from the American Psychological Association. She was recognized for her research on the relationship between clinical, cognitive, and neurobiological disturbances in schizophrenia. Barch and Braver were soon appointed co-directors of the cognitive control and psychopathology laboratory in the psychology department. While conducting research in her laboratory, she co-authored a paper supporting cognitive rehabilitation techniques for schizophrenia. Her research team found that poor memory function in schizophrenia does not reflect an immutable inability to learn new information. Therefore, memory problems in schizophrenia can be reduced by having people use the right memorization strategy.

Barch continued to focus on schizophrenia and coordinated a group of neuroscience researchers to use MRIs to identify and study subtle structural and functional differences in the brains of people with schizophrenia and their relatives. In 2008, Barch was appointed the director of the Silvio Conte Center for Neuroscience Research. In this new role, her research team began trying to identify the neurobiological disturbances in the brains of those with schizophrenia that make them unable to either retain pleasurable memories or to anticipate pleasurable experiences. Barch also became the co-principal investigator of a National Institute of Mental Health project to standardize measurements of cognitive deficits in schizophrenia. In October 2010, she was presented with a Distinguished Faculty Award as a faculty member who has "demonstrated a strong commitment to the intellectual and personal growth of their students."

In 2013, Barch collaborated with Alan Ceaser to research about cognition in schizophrenia and core psychological and neutral mechanisms. They believe that there is a common action that will cause people to get schizophrenia. They can review the pattern of it by examining the context processing, working memory and episodic memory.

Barch is a Principal Investigator of the Human Connectome Project–Development, which aims to map the development of brain connectivity in healthy children. Barch is a deputy editor at Biological Psychiatry. She previously served as editor-in-chief of Cognitive, Affective and Behavioral Neuroscience. Barch is a member of the Society for Experimental Psychology and Cognitive Science.

In 2023 Barch was elected Fellow of the American Association for the Advancement of Science. In 2024 Barch received the National Academy of Medicine's Sarnat International Prize in Mental Health for her contributions to understanding and treating mental health disorders. In 2026, she was awarded the Atkinson Prize in Psychological and Cognitive Sciences by the National Academy of Sciences.
