= Nelson Cowan =

American psychologist

Nelson Cowan Link to image on Cowan's web site
- Born: Washington, D.C., United States
- Education: University of Michigan (BS, 1973); University of Wisconsin (MS, 1978; PhD, 1980)
- Known for: Working memory, Attention, Cognitive development
- Spouse: Jean Ispa
- Children: 3
- Awards: Lifetime Achievement Award from the Society for Experimental Psychology and Cognitive Science (2020); Honorary doctorates (University of Helsinki, Finland, 2003; University of Liège, Belgium, 2015); Society of Experimental Psychologists; President's Faculty Award for Sustained Excellence, University of Missouri System, 2011; Fellow, American Association for the Advancement of Science, 2012; Fellow, American Psychological Association and Charter Fellow, Association for Psychological Science; Golden Chalk Award, for graduate teaching and education, University of Missouri, 1999.
- Scientific career
- Fields: Psychology
- Workplaces: University of Missouri
- Thesis: Toward an understanding of morphological segmentation in unfamiliar languages (1980)
- Doctoral advisor: Philip A. Morse
- Other academic advisors: Lewis A. Leavitt (secondary during Ph.D.), Martin Braine (postdoctoral)
- Website: https://memory.psych.missouri.edu/cowan.html

Nelson Cowan is the Curators' Distinguished Professor Emeritus of Psychological Sciences at the University of Missouri. He specializes in working memory, the small amount of information held in mind and used for language processing and various kinds of problem solving. To overcome conceptual difficulties that arise for models of information processing in which different functions occur in separate boxes, Cowan proposed a more organically organized "embedded processes" model. Within it, representations held in working memory comprise an activated subset of the representations held in long-term memory, with a smaller subset held in a more integrated form in the current focus of attention. Other work has been on the developmental growth of working memory capacity and the scientific method. His work, funded by the National Institutes of Health since 1984 (primarily NICHD), has been cited over 66,000 times according to Google Scholar. The work has resulted in over 250 peer-reviewed articles, over 60 book chapters, 2 sole-authored books, and 4 edited volumes.

In addition to basic scientific work, Cowan's collaborative research related to working memory has led to clarification of the role of memory in language disorders, dyslexia, autism, schizophrenia, Parkinson's disease, amnesia, and alcoholic intoxication, as explained further on his web site and CV. For example, the work on amnesia indicates that individuals who usually cannot form new memories because of stroke or brain damage often demonstrate considerable ability to do so when the information to be memorized is surrounded by several minutes with minimal visual or acoustic interference.

== Main scientific contributions ==
=== Working memory capacity limits ===
Cowan's theoretical model addresses key puzzles in information processing using a new approach in which there are two aspects of working memory: the activated portion of long-term memory, which includes rapidly-learned information limited only by decay and interference among similar features and, within this activated portion, a focus of attention limited to about 3-4 separate items or chunks in typical adults. Cowan contends that previous models did not sufficiently distinguish between these temporary-storage mechanisms. In this theory, why is there interference between words and visual objects like colors when both are held in mind? Because the focus of attention is involved in maintaining information of all types and, when the procedure discourages mnemonic strategies like grouping and rehearsal, the focus of attention is limited to just a few separate units of information - as argued in a review cited over 6,900 times according to Google Scholar. In the brain, an area of the intraparietal sulcus plays a large role in the focus of attention, perhaps serving as an index connected to posterior areas representing the content of active memories.

=== Attention filtering by habituation of orienting ===
In another part of the theory of Cowan, conceptual difficulties of the idea of an attention filter were addressed. If unattended information is filtered out, how can it come to attract attention? In the theory, the attention filter is replaced by the well-known mechanism of orienting of attention. Stimuli with changed physical features attract attention, whereas stimulus features or patterns that are repeated or continuous become a part of the neural model of the environment; there is habituation of the orienting response, and such stimuli stop attracting attention. For example, Emily Elliott and Cowan showed that pre-exposure to sounds to be used as distractors reduced their capability to distract.

In another kind of research on attention, Noelle Wood and Cowan replicated an often-discussed but until then poorly-understood phenomenon termed the cocktail party phenomenon. Using methodology improved from the 1950s, they found that people take a long time to notice subtle acoustic changes in an ignored channel of speech while repeating different speech presented in the other ear, a selective listening task. They also used the improved methodology to replicate the early, poorly-studied finding that about a third of participants notice their names unexpectedly presented in a channel to be ignored . That finding, however, was ambiguous. It could be that high-working-memory-span individuals are better able to monitor the channel to be ignored, or it could be that the low-span individuals cannot fix their attention on the assigned task, so that it wanders over intermittently to sample the channel to be ignored. The results have come out strongly in that direction, with many more low-span individuals noticing their names in the ignored channel. Proving that the results did not have to turn out that way, they were different for healthy older adults; their spans are like relatively low-span younger adults, yet the older adults rarely noticed their names in the channel to be ignored, suggesting that their focus of attention is strategically intact but with possibly a smaller capacity than young adults.

=== Development of working memory ===
In Cowan's work on the childhood development of working memory, a major task has been to deconfound development given that many processes develop together and need to be disentangled. Could it be that working memory capacity increases with age only because of some other factor? Cowan has examined this question repeatedly in different ways and has found that a number of factors are not sufficient. These factors that could not completely account for working memory capacity growth include the allocation of attention to relevant items, encoding speed and rehearsal, and knowledge. In memory for simple, spoken sentences, for example, more mature participants remembered more units, not larger ones. Recent evidence suggests that older children become better able to notice patterns in the stimuli that allow them quickly to memorize information and thereby ease the load on the focus of attention. Consequently, older participants can remember tones or words and colors at the same time, better than younger children with less interference between the two modalities Similar findings have been obtained in the area of adult aging, with a U-shaped development across the life span in the number of items that can be held in working memory without mnemonic strategies. Simple working memory tasks account for aptitudes better in children too young to apply mnemonic strategies, and Cowan has made considerable use of a simple task that maximizes the correlation with aptitudes by making the endpoint of a list unpredictable, known as running memory span. Minimizing mnemonic strategies may mean that more attention is needed for recall, which may also be needed in typical tasks of intellectual aptitudes.

== Early life ==
Cowan provides many biographical details on his web site. He was born in 1951 in Washington, D.C. as the first child (son) of Jewish parents, Arthur Cowan from Boston, an optometrist, and Shirly B. Cowan (nee Frankle) of Baltimore. He grew up in Wheaton, Maryland and attended Wheaton High School. From oldest to youngest he has a younger brother with high-functioning autism diagnosed only at the age of about 50 (Mitchell), who has long been a valuable employee of the Veterans Administration, another younger brother (Elliott) who is an attorney, and a younger sister (Barbara) who is a social worker. Cowan was interested in science including making a telescope out of trial lenses in his father's office, tinkering with electricity and electronics at home, and expressing interest when Francis Crick won the Nobel prize and in the Washington Post indicated that he next wanted to study "how the brain works." Cowan's first experimental project, in a high school research class, involved supercooling suspended animation of rotifers, with guidance from his instructor and Commander Perry at the Bethesda Naval Hospital. Also in high school, reading a description of research studies in sleep and dreams inspired his interest in a career involving research on the brain and mind centered on understanding consciousness, which he hoped would also be of clinical, educational, or practical value. Cowan's home was within biking distance along Rock Creek Park to the National Institutes of Health in Bethesda, MD, and in the summers when home from college, he volunteered there one year (with Monte Buchsbaum), learning computer programming and studying hemispheric laterality, and had a paid assistantship the next summer (with David Jacobowitz). The latter led to his first publication on a study that he suggested to the scientists, on examining the synergic and antagonistic actions of two neurotransmitter systems in rats.

== Academic history ==
=== Education and positions ===
Cowan received a B.S. from the University of Michigan with an independent major in neuroscience in 1973 and a M.S. and Ph.D. in psychology from the University of Wisconsin in 1977 and 1980, respectively, after which he completed a postdoctoral fellowship at New York University. He subsequently was hired as a professor at the University of Massachusetts Amherst in 1982, and in 1985, he joined the faculty of the University of Missouri, where he has remained since. Additionally, Cowan has served as a Distinguished Visiting Professor at the University of Helsinki, the University of Leipzig, the University of Western Australia, the University of Bristol, and the University of Edinburgh, where he also served as a professorial fellow.

=== Professional activities and honors ===
Since 2017, Cowan has been the editor-in-chief of the Journal of Experimental Psychology: General and previously was associate editor of the Journal of Experimental Psychology: Learning, Memory, and Cognition, Quarterly Journal of Experimental Psychology, and the European Journal of Cognitive Psychology. He was awarded honorary doctorates at the University of Helsinki, Finland (2003) and the University of Liège, Belgium (2015). He is a fellow of the Society of Experimental Psychologists and the American Association for the Advancement of Science. Elected posts include member of the Governing Board of the Psychonomic Society (2006-2011) and President of the Experimental Psychology Division (3) of the American Psychological Association (2008-2009). He won the Lifetime Achievement Award from the Society for Experimental Psychology and Cognitive Science (2020).
