= Sarah Brown-Schmidt =

Developmental psychologist

- Occupation: Professor of Psychology
- Awards: Vanderbilt's Peabody Faculty Excellence Award for Service to the Field

Academic background
- Education: Reed College (BA); University of Rochester (MA, PhD)

Academic work
- Institutions: Vanderbilt University
- Website: https://www.sarahbrownschmidt.com/

Sarah Brown-Schmidt is a professor of psychology and human development at Vanderbilt University. Her research examines how people produce and understand language in interactive conversation and how traumatic brain injury affects spoken language comprehension.

Brown-Schmidt was Associate Editor of Cognition from 2017 to 2021 and Senior Editor in 2019. In 2022, she began a term as Editor-in-chief of the Journal of Experimental Psychology: General and serves on the American Psychological Association's Council of Editors. She has also served as Council Chair for the American Association for the Advancement of Science.

== Education and career ==
Brown-Schmidt received her B.A. in psychology from Reed College in 1999. She earned an M.A. (2004) and a Ph.D (2006) in Brain and Cognitive Sciences at the University of Rochester. Her doctoral thesis, supervised by Michael Tanenhaus, was titled Language Processing in Conversation.

Brown-Schmidt was a postdoctoral fellow in the Department of Psychology at the University of Illinois Urbana-Champaign from 2005 to 2007, and at the university's Beckman Institute from 2007 to 2010. She joined the Illinois psychology faculty as an assistant professor in 2010, and was promoted to associate professor in 2014. In 2016, she moved to Vanderbilt University's Department of Psychology and Human Development, and became a full professor in 2021. Her work has been supported by the National Science Foundation and the National Institutes of Health.

=== Honours and awards ===
- Psychonomic Society Early Career Award (2015)
- Vanderbilt's Peabody Faculty Excellence Award for Service to the Field (2025)

== Research ==
Brown-Schmidt studies how people produce and understand utterances during interactive conversation and how conversations and note-taking shape what people remember. Her work follows several main topics:

- How conversational partners' shared and private knowledge and perspective-taking shape language use
- How memory systems interact with real-time language processing
- How speakers turn thoughts into speech in unscripted conversation

Her methods include eye tracking and a "targeted language game" technique for studying unscripted dialogue. In the "targeted language game" approach, pairs of participants do a collaborative task in unscripted conversation, and the task is designed so that specific kinds of referring expressions come up naturally, while eye movements are recorded.

== Selected publications ==
- Arnold, J. E., Eisenband, J. G., Brown-Schmidt, S., & Trueswell, J. C. (2000). The rapid use of gender information: Evidence of the time course of pronoun resolution from eyetracking. Cognition, 76(1), B13–B26. https://doi.org/10.1016/S0010-0277(00)00073-1
- Brown-Schmidt, S. (2009). Partner-specific interpretation of maintained referential precedents during interactive dialog. Journal of Memory and Language, 61(2), 171-190. https://doi.org/10.1016/j.jml.2009.04.003
- Brown-Schmidt, S. (2009). The role of executive function in perspective taking during online language comprehension. Psychonomic Bulletin & Review, 16(5), 893–900. https://doi.org/10.3758/PBR.16.5.893
- Brown-Schmidt, S., Gunlogson, C., & Tanenhaus, M. K. (2008). Addressees distinguish shared from private information when interpreting questions during interactive conversation. Cognition, 107(3), 1122–1134. https://doi.org/10.1016/j.cognition.2007.11.005
- Duff, M. C., & Brown-Schmidt, S. (2012). The hippocampus and the flexible use and processing of language. Frontiers in Human Neuroscience, 6, 69. https://doi.org/10.3389/fnhum.2012.00069
