= Randall Engle =

American psychologist

- Born: December 2, 1946 (age 79)
- Citizenship: American
- Education: West Virginia State College (BA, 1968); Ohio State University (MA, 1969; PhD, 1973)
- Known for: Working memory, Attentional control, Human intelligence
- Awards: Lifetime Achievement Award from the Society for Experimental Psychology and Cognitive Science (2013), Mentor Award from the Association for Psychological Science (2017), the Amoco Award for University Teacher of the Year (1993), Distinguished Honors College Professor (1992), the Ace Teacher Award (1991), the Mortar Board Excellence in Teaching Award (1988, 1994).
- Scientific career
- Fields: Psychology
- Workplaces: Georgia Institute of Technology
- Thesis: The interaction between presentation rate, retention test and the negative recency effect (1973)
- Doctoral advisor: D.D. Wickens

Randall Wayne Engle is an American psychologist and professor of psychology at the Georgia Institute of Technology. Engle is known for his research on working memory, attentional control, and human intelligence. Specifically, his research investigates the nature of working memory, the causes of its limitations, its role in applied cognitive tasks, and the relationships between working memory, cognitive control, and fluid intelligence. His work has received funding from the National Institute of Child Health and Human Development, Air Force Office of Scientific Research, DARPA, and Office of Naval Research. Engle's work has influenced modern theories of cognitive and emotional control, and has had an impact on a number of fields including social psychology, emotion, psychopathology, developmental psychology, and psychological testing. According to Google Scholar, his work has been cited over 48,000 times. Engle is the principal investigator in the Attention & Working Memory Lab at the Georgia Institute of Technology.

== Professional affiliations ==
Engle was inducted into the National Academy of Sciences on April 27, 2020. Engle is a Fellow and former President of the American Psychological Association's Society for Experimental Psychology and Cognitive Science, as well as a fellow of the Association for Psychological Science, the American Association for the Advancement of Science, and the Society of Experimental Psychologists. He also was a Chair of the Governing Board of the Psychonomic Society and a chair of the executive board of the Council of Graduate Departments of Psychology. He was elected a fellow of the American Academy of Arts and Sciences in 2018. Engle served as Editor-in-Chief for the journal Current Directions in Psychological Science for a decade. He also was the founder and Director of the Georgia State University/Georgia Institute of Technology Center for Advanced Brain Imaging.

== Biography ==
Engle spent his childhood in rural West Virginia. He was the first college graduate in his family. He earned a Bachelor of Arts degree in psychology from West Virginia State College in 1968. As an undergraduate, he earned nearly as many credits in mathematics and zoology as in psychology, and only found out about the field through a fellow student who mentioned it during freshman orientation. Engle was interested in the experimental study of thought and behavior, and began his graduate studies at Ohio State under the direction of D. D. Wickens. In 1973, Engle earned his Ph.D. His thesis was titled “The interaction between presentation rate, retention test and the negative recency effect.” After graduating, Engle spent two years at King College in Tennessee where he honed his teaching skills; he taught 10 courses per year. During this time he published several articles on modality effects in short-term memory. His work attracted the attention of the University of South Carolina, where he was hired and would eventually be promoted to Professor in 1983. Twelve years later, in 1995, Randy was offered the chair position in the School of Psychology at the Georgia Institute of Technology. He accepted the position and served as chair for 13 years. Today, he is a professor of psychology at Georgia Tech.

== Working Memory and Attention Control Tasks ==
The cognitive tests used in Engle's lab to measure individual differences in working memory capacity and attention control are freely available for download from the Attention & Working Memory Lab website: http://englelab.gatech.edu/taskdownloads.

== Influential Publications ==
The following publications each have over 2,000 citations according to Google Scholar.

Engle, R. W., Tuholski, S. W., Laughlin, J. E., & Conway, A. R. (1999). Working memory, short-term memory, and general fluid intelligence: a latent-variable approach. Journal of Experimental Psychology: General, 128, 309–331.

Engle, R. W. (2002). Working memory capacity as executive attention. Current Directions in Psychological Science, 11, 19–23.

Turner, M. L., & Engle, R. W. (1989). Is working memory capacity task dependent? Journal of Memory and Language, 28, 127–154.

Conway, A. R., Kane, M. J., Bunting, M. F., Hambrick, D. Z., Wilhelm, O., & Engle, R. W. (2005). Working memory span tasks: A methodological review and user's guide. Psychonomic Bulletin & Review, 12, 769–786.

Kane, M. J., & Engle, R. W. (2002). The role of prefrontal cortex in working-memory capacity, executive attention, and general fluid intelligence: An individual-differences perspective. Psychonomic Bulletin & Review, 9, 637–671.

== Presentations and Interviews ==
Below is a list of presentations and interviews given by Randall Engle:

2017 Psychonomic Society Annual Meeting Keynote Address
https://www.youtube.com/watch?v=t0wyyfpj640

Brief History of Individual Differences in Working Memory Capacity
https://www.youtube.com/watch?v=woYyc-jcMJc

2019 meeting of the International Society for Intelligence Research
http://englelab.gatech.edu/about

An Interview with Professor Randall Engle
https://in-sightjournal.com/2016/05/22/an-interview-with-professor-randell-engle-adjunct-professor-psychiatry-emory-medical-school-professional-fellow-psychology-university-of-edinburgh-principle-investigator-attention-and-working/
