= Butterfly stroke =

Swimming stroke

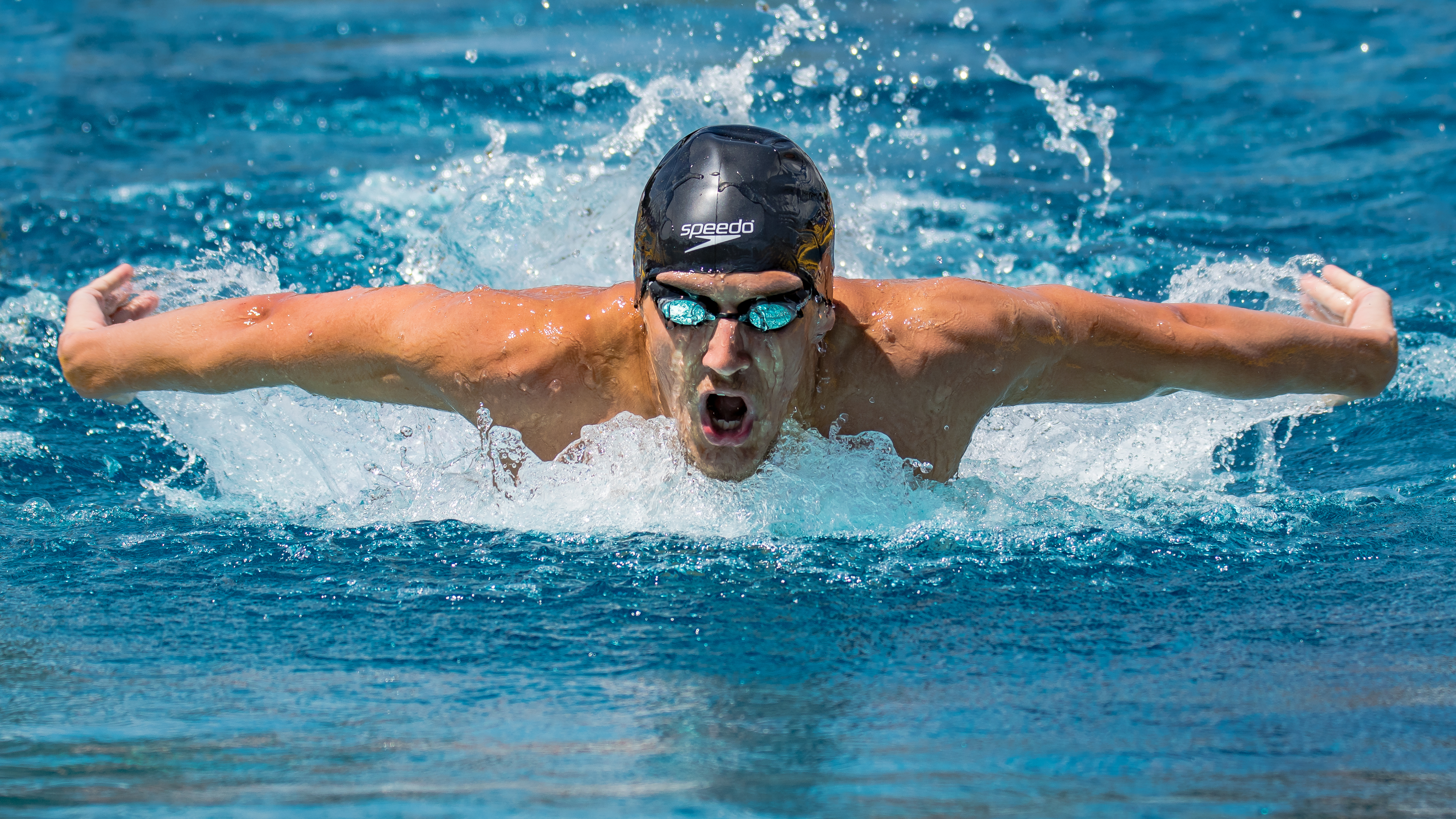
Butterfly stroke

Butterfly (shortened to fly) is a swimming stroke swum on the front. Both the arms and the legs are symmetric, with the arms moving symmetrically down the front of the body and then over the water, and the legs moving up and down together in a dolphin kick.

== Technique ==
Animation of the butterfly stroke from the top perspective

Swimmer performing the butterfly stroke, filmed from above

Butterfly, shortened to "fly", is a symmetric and undulating stroke. For most competitive swimmers, butterfly is the second fastest stroke, slower only than front crawl. Edward Wasserman wrote that for most competitive swimming fans, butterfly is the most exciting to watch.

During butterfly, the arms move symmetrically down the front of the body and then over the water, while the legs move up and down together in a dolphin kick. Each butterfly stroke cycle consists of two kicks and one full arm stroke, with each stroke cycle beginning when the arms enter the water in front.

=== Arm movement ===
The butterfly arm movement can be broken down into five phases: the entry and stretch, the outsweep and catch, the insweep, the upsweep, and the release and recovery.

==== Entry and stretch ====
The entry and stretch begins when the arms enter the water above the head. The arms should enter straight or with the elbows slightly bent, about shoulder-width apart, and with the thumbs pointing downward so that the hands can slice into the water.

==== Outsweep and catch ====
The purpose of the outsweep is to position the arms in such a way as to maximise the propulsion from the insweep that follows. The catch occurs towards the end of the outsweep and is the position from which the swimmer transitions to the insweep.

During the outsweep, the hands sweep outward and rotate, and the elbows bend, such that by the end of the outsweep, the arms are further than shoulder-width apart and the whole of each arm is facing backwards against the water. Throughout the outsweep, the arms decelerate so that they are moving slowly during the catch before accelerating during the insweep.

==== Insweep ====
The insweep begins when the water is caught at the end out the outsweep. The arms accelerate in a semi-circle towards the waist, moving slightly outwards at the beginning of the insweep and then inwards for the remainder of the phase. The insweep finishes when the hands are close together near the middle of the body. Moving the arms in this shape allows them to pull more still water, which provides greater resistance and therefore greater propulsion. It also makes the pull longer, allows multiple muscles to assist with the pull, and transitions well into the upsweep.

During the insweep, the whole of each arm is used to pull back on the water and generate propulsion, with the elbows being held high and bent to almost right angles to provide leverage against the water. The insweep movement of each arm is similar to the insweep motion in front crawl, however in contrast to in front crawl, the butterfly arms move together so their torques cancel out and there is no rotation along the body's longitudinal axis.

==== Upsweep ====
The upsweep is initiated by the hands altering their backwards trajectory to move away from each other and upwards towards the surface of the water. The elbows remain bent, so the arm can continue to pull back on the water, and, after decelerating during the transition from the insweep, the arms accelerate again to provide propulsion. The upsweep finishes as the hands decelerate for the last time underwater, preparing to exit the water for the recovery. By this point, the hands should be near the thighs.

==== Release and recovery ====
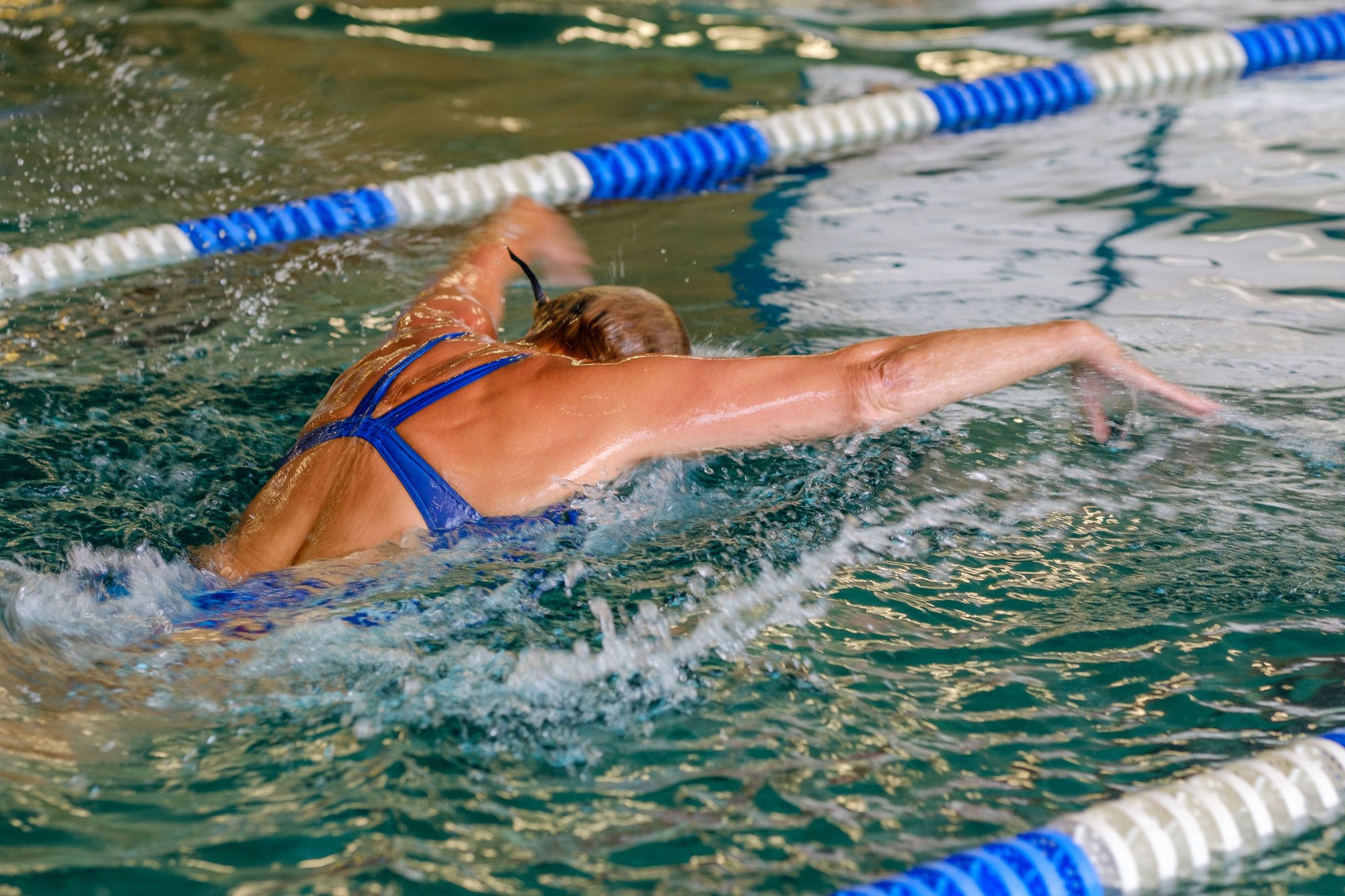
Butterfly stroke, shortly before the arms enter the water again at the end of the recovery

The deceleration of the arms causes them to release pressure on the water and cease providing propulsion. The hands then turn so that the palms face inward, which allows the hands to exit the water with minimal drag. The upper arms then exit the water first, followed by the lower arms and hands. As the arms exit the water, the elbow straightens, so that during the rest of the recovery, the arms are either fully extended or almost fully extended. The arms then travel out and over the surface of the water, so that they are ready to enter thumbs first and begin the next stroke cycle. The muscles in the arms should be relaxed as much as possible during the recovery, to allow them to recover ready for the next cycle.

=== Leg movement ===
Each dolphin kick can be broken down into two phases: the upbeat and the downbeat. The upbeat occurs as the legs move upwards, and the downbeat occurs as they move downwards.

=== Wave-like coordination ===
Animation of the butterfly stroke from the front perspective

Swimmer performing the butterfly stroke, filmed from underwater

Wave-like coordination in butterfly facilitates energy transfer between body parts, making the stroke more efficient. Two distinct wave-like motions are present: The first occurs once per arm cycle and is formed by the midline of the body coordinating to form the wave from head to toe, establishing a rhythm that the arms coordinate with, while the second occurs twice per arm cycle and accounts for the almost all of the rest of the movement in the lower body, from the hips downwards.

During the recovery, since the upper body is lifted out of the water, it has high gravitational energy. This potential energy can be utilised to initiate the downward movement of the head and chest at the end of the recovery, which begins the first wave's movement down the body. The downward movement of this wave continues down the body until it is completed with the downbeat of the first kick. (Note: In "Swimming Fastest", Ernest Maglischo writes that it should begin slightly before the arm entry. In "Science of Swimming", Ross Sanders and Carla McCabe write that it should assist the arm entry, and in the Human Movement Science journal, Seifert et al. writes that it should happen slightly after the arm entry.)

Higher-skilled butterfly swimmers travel further per stroke and exhibit greater synchronisation between the arms and legs at various points throughout each stroke cycle. (Note: Elite swimmers exhibit greater synchronisation between the beginning of the arm pull and the upbeat of the first kick, and between the beginning of the arm push and the downbeat of the second kick.) Greater speed variation within each cycle is also associated with less efficiency.

=== Wave propulsion ===
If the swimmer sharply decelerates the arms during the release, at the body's peak velocity during the upsweep, then the swimmers velocity will sharply decrease. If this occurs, then the wake of the wave generated by the swimmer when they were at peak velocity will catch up during the first half of the recovery and propel them forward. This phenomenon is termed wave propulsion.

== Start, turn and finish ==
Butterfly uses the regular start for swimming, if in a competition the swimmer would start off a diving block. After the start, a gliding phase follows underwater, followed by dolphin kicks swimming underwater. Swimming underwater reduces the drag from breaking the surface and is very economical. Rules allow for 15 m underwater swimming before the head breaks the surface and regular swimming begins.

The turn and finish requires the swimmer to touch the wall "with both hands separated and simultaneously". Both hands must simultaneously touch the wall during turns and finish while the swimmer remains swimming face down. The swimmer touches the wall with both hands while bending the elbows slightly. The bent elbows allow the swimmer to push themself away from the wall and turn sideways. One hand leaves the wall to be moved to the front underwater. At the same time, the legs are pulled closer and moved underneath the body towards the wall. The second hand leaves the wall to be moved to the front over water. It is commonly referred to as an "over/under turn" or an "open turn". The legs touch the wall, and the hands are at the front. The swimmer sinks underwater and lies on the breast, or nearly so. Then the swimmer pushes off the wall, keeping a streamlined position with the hands to the front. Like the start, the swimmer is allowed to swim 15 metres underwater before the head breaks the surface. Most swimmers dolphin kick after an initial gliding phase.

== Training ==
Competitive swimmers often train the butterfly stroke using interval sets that combine short sprint distances with longer aerobic repetitions in order to maintain stroke efficiency under fatigue.

== History ==
The butterfly arms and kick developed independently before being combined to form the butterfly stroke. The development of butterfly and its eventual inclusion as a separate stroke took just under 25 years. In the Journal of Olympic History, David and Robert Barney compared the history of the stroke to Odysseus' journey in the Odyssey, writing that "in the minds of many [...] the journey featured as many pitfalls and perils in the turbulent seas of the international swimming world as Odysseus might have encountered on the storm-tossed waters of the Aegean and Ionian Seas on his homeward voyage to Ithaca."

=== Origins of the butterfly kick ===
The invention of the dolphin kick has been credited to George Corsan, who introduced it by demonstration to David Armbruster in 1911 and called it the "fishtail kick", and to Volney Wilson, who invented the kick after analyzing the movements of fish at the Shedd Aquarium in Chicago. Another discovery of the kick was made by Jack Sieg, who, while being watched by Armbruster, went underwater, lay on his side, and performed the kick in imitation of a fish. Using this technique, Sieg was able to beat the best flutter kickers at the University of Iowa.

Armbruster and Sieg experimented with using the butterfly kick in breaststroke, calling it the "dolphin breaststroke kick". They published their results in a 1935 article called "The Dolphin Breast Stroke" in The Journal of Health and Physical Education where, due to its potential to be faster than the traditional whip kick, Armbruster was enthusiastic to have it legalized within the breaststroke rules, to "offer this new type of stroke for exploitation as a competitive or racing-speed stroke". Armbruster followed this appeal with another article in the 1937 NCAA Swimming and Diving Guide, which urged the NCAA to allow the kick in the rules for the extra speed. This however did not come to fruition, as in a FINA meeting in October 1938, the bureau unanimously agreed to prohibit up-and-down movements of the legs in the vertical plane.

=== Origins of the butterfly arms ===
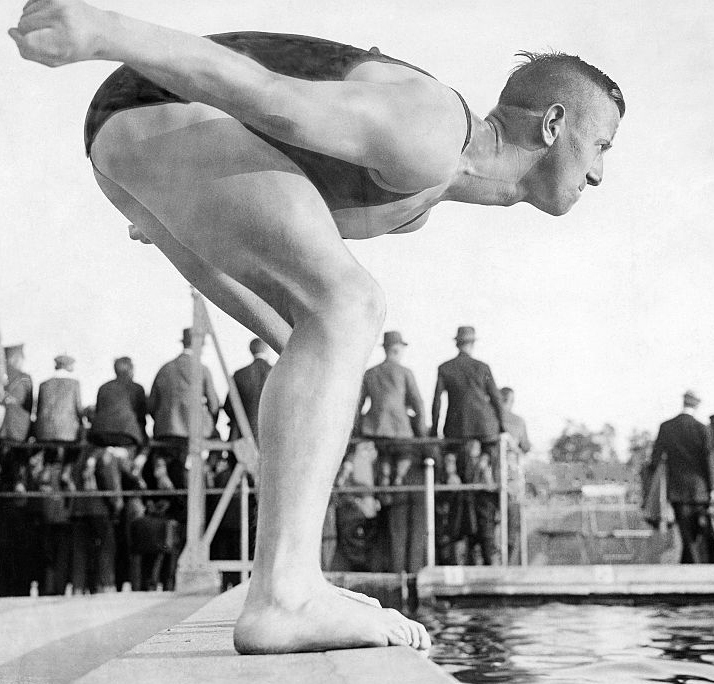
Germany's Erich Rademacher was one of the first people to use the overarm recovery in breaststroke.

The butterfly arms evolved from a loophole in the breaststroke rules. Prior to 1935, both the FINA and NCAA breaststroke rules stated that the arms had to be simultaneously pushed forward on recovery. Since the rules did not state that the arm recovery had to be underwater, in 1926, Germany's Erich Rademacher began using an overarm recovery, which was initially called the "flying fish", or the "fly-away" technique. (Note: Some writers credit Sydney Cavill with creating the overarm recovery.) Rademacher generally used this technique coming out of the turns, which was dubbed the "flying breaststroke turn", and at the end of the race, which was dubbed the "flying finish".

Rademacher insisted that this did not break the rules, and he continued to use it in the late 1920s and early 1930s in the United States. (Note: Sources conflict as to whether he used it in the 1928 Summer Olympics, with the International Swimming Hall of Fame saying he did and Francois Oppenheim's book "The History of Swimming" saying he didn't.) Other early adoptees of the flying breaststroke turn were Walter and Wallace Spence, who went on to dominate the breaststroke events using it. In 1933, Henry Myers extended the use of the butterfly arm to every stroke cycle, completely replacing the traditional breaststroke underwater recovery; he used this technique for the first time against Wallace Spence in the breaststroke leg of a three-stroke medley. (Note: Sources conflict on whether Myers beat Spence on the breaststroke split, with Cecil Colwin writing in Swim News that he didn't, and a letter from Myers claiming he did.) The reaction to his technique was mixed; Myers was not disqualified and some spectators praised the innovation, while Spence withdrew from the event and the Brooklyn Central YMCA's magazine included an article criticising "the sportsmanship of young Myers who observed the letter but not the spirit of the breaststroke rules". Myers argued the butterfly recovery was more exciting for spectators, saying:

It [is] uninteresting to watch a breaststroke race, in time, the old breaststroke would have become as passé as the English sidestroke, as far as racing is concerned. A butterfly-breaststroke race is a very exciting race to watch. The splashing and violent arm-motion seems to be quite conducive to spectator enthusiasm.

In 1935, presumably to make it clearer that the butterfly arms were legal, the NCAA changed the wording of the rule regarding the breaststroke recovery to use the word "moved", rather than "pushed", and the European rules followed, legalising the technique; it later became known as "butterfly-breaststroke". As the overarm recovery caught on more, John Higgins, at the 1936 National AAU Indoor Swimming Championships, swam new world record of 1:10.8 for the 100-metre breaststroke, becoming the first swimmer to set a world record using the butterfly arms exclusively, and later at the 1936 US Olympic Trials, again using the technique, Higgins set a new world record in the 200 m breaststroke of 2:44.1. In the 200 m breaststroke at the 1936 Berlin Olympics, Higgins finished fourth while using the butterfly-breaststroke technique. Butterfly-breaststroke was almost prohibited in an October 1938 FINA Executive Bureau meeting, where four of seven votes were in favour of disallowing it, but since a two-thirds majority was required to change technical rules, the motion was not carried. In the 200 m breaststroke at the 1948 London Olympics, all but one of the finalists used butterfly-breaststroke throughout, and the only finalist who did not use it on every stroke (Bob Bonte of the Netherlands) finished last.

This dominant display of butterfly-breaststroke led to the idea of separating breaststroke into two breaststroke events: traditional breaststroke and butterfly-breaststroke. However, the IOC president Sigfrid Edstrom decided not to add any events to the 1952 Helsinki Olympics, due to the chaotic situation after World War II. Despite this, FINA did add a definition of the two styles of breaststroke to the rules which named traditional breaststroke style "A" and butterfly-breaststroke style "B". A consequence of this was competitors were not able to swim both of the styles in the same race.

=== Origins of the full butterfly stroke ===
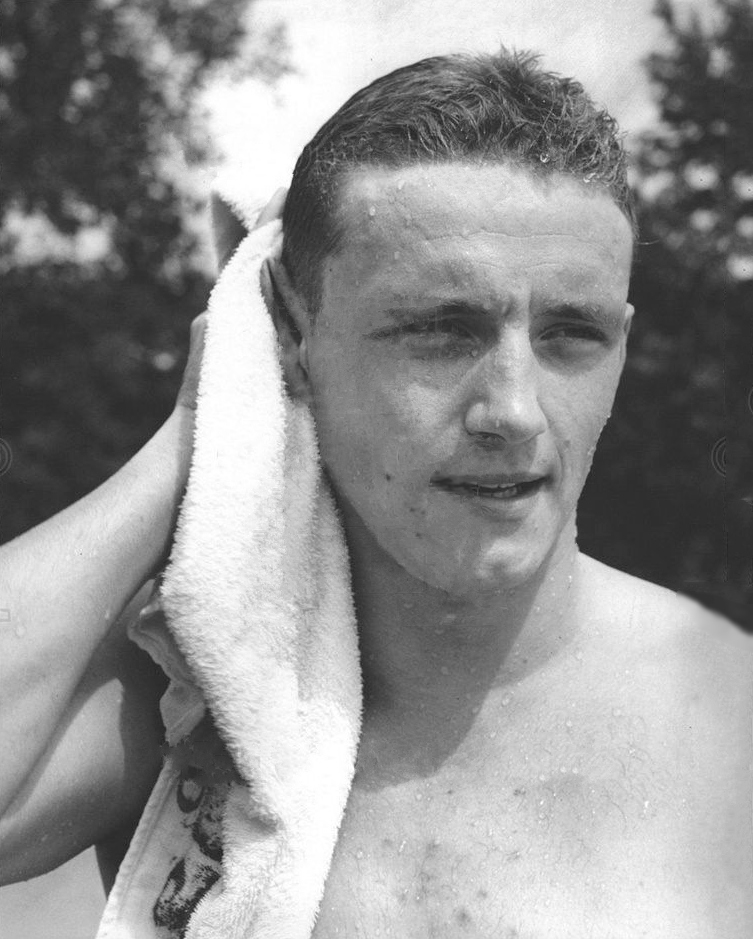
William Yorzyk won the first ever butterfly event at the Olympics, winning gold in the 200-metre butterfly at the 1956 Summer Olympics.

Back in 1932, after seeing variations of the butterfly pull demonstrated at swimming exhibitions, and having worked on developing the dolphin kick, Armbruster and Sieg had merged the two together to create the first full butterfly stroke. They reported on this new stroke in The Dolphin Breast Stroke, calling it the "dolphin butterfly breast stroke". The stroke was not legal in any of the events of the time, so it was not until 1952, when the argument for separating the A and B styles of breaststroke was gaining traction, that FINA separated breaststroke into two different events: breaststroke (the previous style A), and butterfly (the previous style B). Furthermore, while traditional breaststroke required the whip kick, the new butterfly stroke allowed the use of the butterfly kick. The butterfly stroke was first seen in the Olympics at the 1956 Summer Games, where the men's 200 m butterfly event was won by William Yorzyk, and the women's 100 m butterfly event was won by Shelley Mann.

== See also ==
- 50 metres butterfly
- 100 metres butterfly
- 200 metres butterfly

== Bibliography ==
- Maglischo, Ernest (2003). Swimming Fastest (3rd ed.). Champaign, Illinois: Human Kinetics. ISBN 0736031804.
- Seifert, L.; Boulesteix, L.; Chollet, D.; Vilas-Boas, J. P. (1 February 2008). "Differences in spatial-temporal parameters and arm–leg coordination in butterfly stroke as a function of race pace, skill and gender". Human Movement Science. 27 (1). doi:10.1016/j.humov.2007.08.001. ISSN 0167-9457 – via ScienceDirect.
- Barney, David; Barney, Robert (December 2008). "A Long Night's Journey Into Day: the Odyssey of Butterfly". Journal of Olympic History. 16 (3): 11–25 – via Olympic World Library.
- Sanders, Ross; McCabe, Carla (2015). Riewald, Scott; Rodeo, Scott (eds.). Science of Swimming Faster. Human Kinetics. ISBN 978-0-7360-9571-6.
- Colwin, Cecil (20 February 2002). Breakthrough Swimming. Human Kinetics. ISBN 9780736037778.
- Oppenheim, Francois (1970). The History of Swimming. Swimming World. pp. 120–121.
- Colwin, Cecil (1997). "Swim News - April 1997 (No.227)". Swim News. pp. 22–23.
- Wasserman, Edward (2021). As If by Design: How Creative Behaviors Really Evolve. Cambridge University Press. pp. 28–38. ISBN 9781108774895.
- Sanders, Ross; Cappaert, Jane; Devlin, Roni (January 1995). "Wave characteristics of butterfly swimming". Journal of Biomechanics. 28 (1): 9–16. doi:10.1016/0021-9290(95)80002-6.
