= Reinout Wiers =

Dutch psychologist and writer

- Born: Netherlands
- Occupations: Psychologist, writer
- Known for: Introduction of the alcohol‐related approach–avoidance task (AAT) and research on neurocognitive processes in addiction
- Title: Professor of Developmental Psychopathology
- Board member of: Centre for Urban Mental Health

Academic background
- Education: University of Amsterdam (Ph.D.)
- Thesis: (1998)
- Doctoral advisor: Joe Sergeant, Boudewijn Gunning, Ken Sher

Academic work
- Discipline: Psychology
- Sub-discipline: Developmental psychopathology, addiction research
- Institutions: University of Amsterdam; Maastricht University; Radboud Universiteit Nijmegen
- Main interests: Neurocognitive processes in addiction and related disorders
- Notable works: Handbook of Implicit Cognition and Addiction (2006); A New Approach to Addiction and Choice (2024)
- Notable ideas: Alcohol‐related approach–avoidance task (AAT)

Reinout W. H. J. Wiers is a Dutch psychologist and writer. He currently serves as a Professor of Developmental Psychopathology at the University of Amsterdam, a position he has held since 2008. He also serves as the co-chair of the Centre for Urban Mental Health.

== Early life and education ==
Wiers was born in the Netherlands. He earned a Master of Science in psychonomics from the University of Amsterdam in 1992, graduating cum laude. Later, he completed his Ph.D. in experimental psychopathology at the same institution in 1998, under the supervision of Joe Sergeant, Boudewijn Gunning, and Ken Sher from the University of Missouri.

== Career ==
From 1998 to 2002, Wiers was an assistant professor of psychology at Maastricht University. He then became an associate professor in Experimental Addiction Research at Maastricht University, a role he held until 2008. Between 2006 and 2008, he was also a Professor of Experimental Psychological Research on Addictive Behaviors in Youth at Radboud Universiteit Nijmegen. From 2014 to 2019, he also served as a professor at FMG-UvA.

Wiers also works with several European and international research consortia.

== Research ==
Wiers conducts research on the neurocognitive processes involved in addiction and related disorders, aiming to develop effective interventions.

In 2009, Wiers introduced the alcohol-related approach-avoidance task (AAT), a tool for assessing implicit appetitive tendencies toward alcohol. Building on this, Wiers developed automatic action tendency re-training to reduce alcohol consumption among students and increase abstinence rates in alcoholic patients, with subsequent studies validating these interventions.

In 2010, Wiers conducted the first randomized controlled trial on attentional retraining for alcohol use disorders and explored neurocognitive predictors of addiction trajectories. His work also includes interventions such as transcranial direct current stimulation (tDCS) for addiction and the development of training programs for other disorders, including anxiety and depression.

Wiers is involved in integrating Cognitive Behavior Therapy (CBT) with Cognitive Bias Modification (CBM) applications, including mobile and gamified formats.

== Bibliography ==
- Handbook of Implicit Cognition and Addiction (2006)
- A New Approach to Addiction and Choice (2024)

== Awards and recognition ==
Wiers was awarded the VIDI research grant in 2002 and the VICI research grant in 2008 by the Dutch National Science Foundation (N.W.O.) for his work on implicit cognition and addiction.
