= David A. Washburn =

American psychologist (1961–2025)

- Born: October 5, 1961; Birmingham, AL, USA
- Died: January 24, 2025 (aged 63); Lookout Mountain, GA, USA
- Citizenship: American
- Education: Covenant College; Georgia State University
- Known for: Computer-based testing of human and nonhuman primates using game-like tasks
- Scientific career
- Fields: Psychology
- Institutions: Georgia State University; Covenant College
- Thesis: A Cognitive and Comparative Investigation of Attention: The Stimulus Movement Effect (1991)
- Doctoral advisor: R. Thompson Putney
- Other academic advisors: Duane M. Rumbaugh, James L. Pate, Michael J. Rulon

David Alan Washburn(October 5, 1961 – January 24, 2025) was an American psychologist who was professor emeritus of psychology and neuroscience at Georgia State University. From 2001 to 2019, he also served as the Director of the Georgia State University Language Research Center. In August, 2019, he retired at Georgia State University and joined the faculty of his alma mater as professor of psychology at Covenant College. His research included studies of individual and group (including primate species) differences in cognitive competencies, particularly attention and its relation to learning, memory, and executive functioning. He is best known for his noninvasive behavioral and cognitive research with monkeys, using game-like computerized tasks.

== Professional affiliations ==
Washburn was a Fellow and former President of the American Psychological Association's Society for Experimental Psychology and Cognitive Science (APA Division 3) and Society for Behavioral Neuroscience and Comparative Psychology (APA Division 6). He was also a fellow of the Association for Psychological Science and the Psychonomic Society. He was also elected to terms as president and other offices of the Society for Computers in Psychology, the Southern Society for Philosophy and Psychology, and the Southeastern Psychological Association. He co-authored (with Duane M. Rumbaugh) The Intelligence of Apes and Other Rational Beings (Yale University Press, 2003) and edited Primate Perspectives on Behavior and Cognition (American Psychological Association, 2007).

== Death ==
Washburn died on January 24, 2025 from cancer.
