= Abram Amsel =

American psychologist (1922-2006)

- Born: December 4, 1922; Montreal, Quebec
- Died: August 31, 2006 (aged 83)
- Occupation: Psychologist

Abram Amsel (December 4, 1922 – August 31, 2006) was a Canadian-born American psychologist and faculty member at several universities. A member of the National Academy of Sciences and a Fellow of the American Association for the Advancement of Science, he conducted influential research into concepts of reward and nonreward in learning and behavior. Later, his research shifted from learning theory to neurobiology.

== Early life ==
Amsel was born in Montreal, Quebec on December 4, 1922. He earned undergraduate and master's degrees in psychology from Queen's University (1944) and McGill University (1946), respectively. He completed his Ph.D. at the University of Iowa, where his mentor was learning and motivation researcher Kenneth Spence, who had been a protégé of Clark L. Hull at Yale University. Shortly after he finished the Ph.D., Amsel completed research that expanded upon the Hull-Spence theory of learning and motivation.

== Career ==
Amsel noted a phenomenon that he called frustrative nonreward in which a subject is expecting a reward but does not receive one. In this circumstance, nonreward becomes aversive. He presented his findings on frustrative nonreward at a conference in 1951. They were based on finding a frustration effect (FE) with rats in a double-runway: faster running after reward omission at the beginning of the second runway. Psychological Review rejected the ideas for publication, with one reviewer noting that he was loath "to revive Hullian theory". Seven years later, the paper was published in Psychological Bulletin, where it had become the journal's second-most cited paper by the late 1980s. Amsel wrote a book on the concept, Frustration Theory: An Analysis of Dispositional Learning and Memory.

An alternative account of the FE, now termed the omission effect and supported subsequently by a series of experiments, was presented by Staddon and Innis in 1966, and the topic rather faded from the animal-learning literature.

Later in his career, Amsel's research interests evolved from learning theory toward neurobiology as he worked to understand developmental differences in his young and mature rat subjects.

Amsel held faculty appointments at Newcomb College (1948–60), the University of Toronto (1960-69) and the University of Texas at Austin (1969–99). Amsel replaced Spence at Texas after the latter died of cancer. He conducted research that clarified the role of nonreward and frustration on classical conditioning. Amsel founded the journal Animal Learning & Behavior in 1973; it is now known as Learning & Behavior. He was elected chairman of the board of the Psychonomic Society in 1978.

He became a Fellow of the American Association for the Advancement of Science in 1951 and was elected to the National Academy of Sciences in 1992. He died of Alzheimer's disease in Austin on August 31, 2006. Amsel was survived by his wife Tess and their children. Amsel had a Jaguar in his garage for many years; he said that the smell of the leather reminded him of when he was dating Tess.
