= Greeble (psychology) =

Psychological construct pertaining to facial recognition

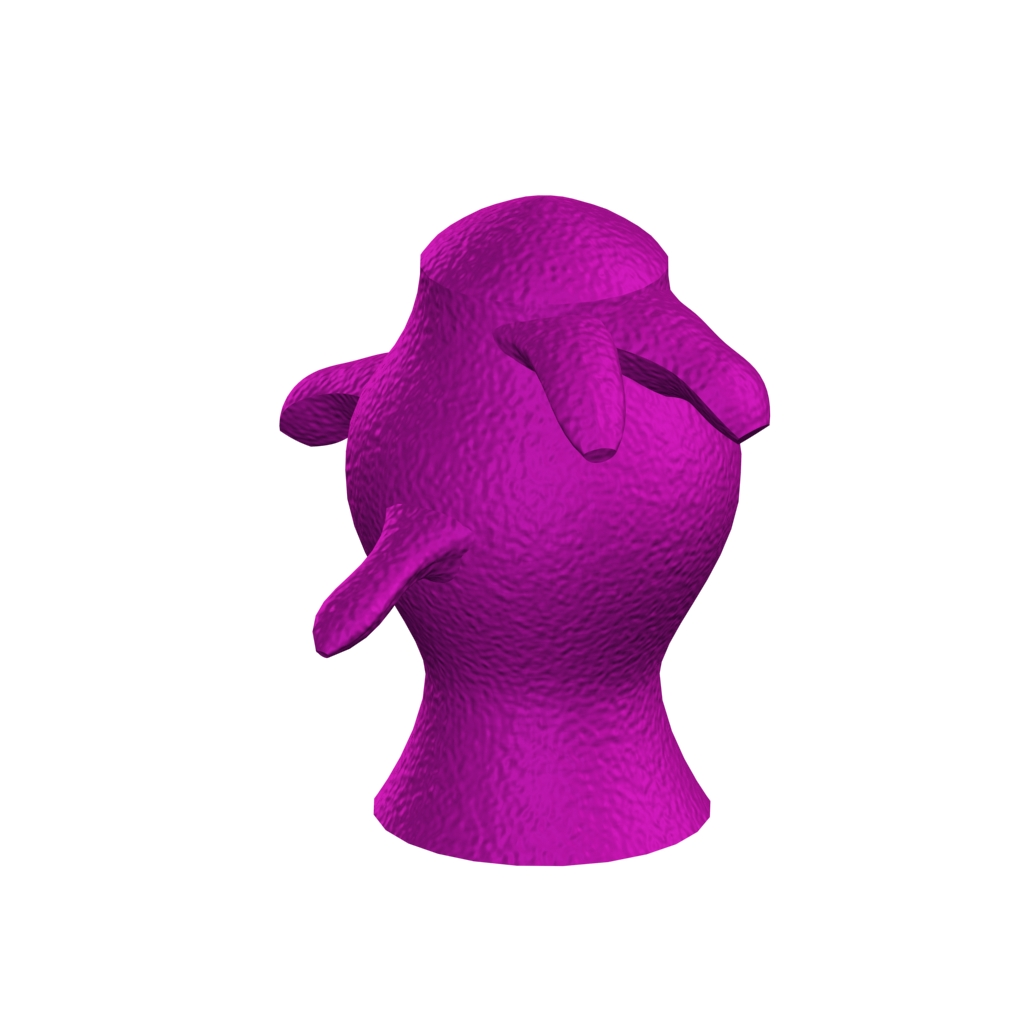
An example of a single Greeble

The Greebles are artificial objects designed to be used as stimuli in psychological studies of object and face recognition. They were named by the American psychologist Robert Abelson. The greebles were created in 1996 by Scott Yu using AliasSketch! software (Macintosh version) for Isabel Gauthier's dissertation work at Yale University working with her PhD advisor, Michael Tarr. They were created as visual stimuli for human cognitive and cognitive neuroscience experiments and were intentionally designed to share some constraints with faces: they have a small number of unique parts in a common configuration that defines an individual's membership in both a particular "family" and being of a particular "gender". Greebles have appeared in a variety of textbooks, and in more than 100 scientific articles on human perception and cognition. They have most often been used in as stimuli in face-like tasks where the goal is to study processing or learning for novel, never-before-seen objects. They have also been 3D printed and used in studies of haptic perception.

While Greebles have been used in a wide variety of research paradigms, the two canonical results are both built on an experimental design in which participants learn to name individual greebles, identify their family, and classify their gender over several experimental sessions. The original behavioral study explores whether expertise with Greebles can produce face-like recognition mechanisms. The authors trained participants to become "Greeble experts" and found that, as with faces, these newly-trained experts exhibited sensitivity to configural transformations—meaning they processed the arrangement of parts more holistically. These results suggest that face-specific effects may stem from general perceptual expertise with homogeneous stimuli rather than from face-exclusive mechanisms. The followup neuroimaging (fMRI) study investigates whether the fusiform face area (FFA) in the brain, traditionally linked to face recognition, is similarly driven by expertise rather than face-specific processing alone. Using fMRI, participants were trained to become experts at recognizing Greebles. With increasing expertise, participants showed heightened activation in the FFA for Greebles, especially in the right middle fusiform gyrus. These results suggest that the FFA is not exclusively specialized for faces but may be recruited for expert-level object recognition more broadly. A similar result was obtained using the same basic design, but ERPs as the dependent measure.

Greebles
	samar	osmit	galli	radok	tasio
plok					
glip					

Since those original studies there has been extensive debate on how to interpret these and related results. A somewhat dated discussion of the differing points of view may be found in a paired set of articles written by Tarr & Gauthier, and Kanwisher. Perhaps most pertinent to the debate, similar activation of the FFA may be found for pre-existing experts—car and bird experts—but only for their domain of expertise (i.e., bird experts do not show face-like effects when viewing cars and car experts do not show face-like effects for viewing birds). Moreover, the degree of activation for the FFA was correlated with the behaviorally measured degree of expertise in each individual participant. Similar effect have been found for other visual domains as well, including chess boards for chess experts. For a more modern take on the neural constraints that lead to selective category responses in human visual cortex, see this recent chapter by Mahon.

== See also ==
- The Wug Test – A psycholinguistic test involving pseudowords and artificial creatures
