= Comparative Cognition Society =

The Comparative Cognition Society (CCS) is one of the primary scientific societies for the study of animal cognition and comparative psychology. The CCS is a non-profit, international society dedicated to gaining a greater understanding of the nature and evolution of cognition in human and non-human animals.

== Membership ==
Members of the CCS include university professors, postdoctoral fellows and graduate students. Members come from many different disciplines including psychology, biology, anthropology and applied animal behaviour.

Membership to the society supports the annual International Conference on Comparative Cognition (CO3) in Melbourne, Florida. The CCS also organizes a Fall Meeting conference, coordinated with the annual meeting of the Psychonomic Society.

== History ==
The society was formed in 1999 by 100 or so active researchers in the area of comparative cognition. The society's founding president (1999-2000) was Ron Weisman. Since its formation, CCS has been run by both new and founding members, elected as part of the executive board.

Past Presidents of the Comparative Cognition Society
	2000 - 2001	2001 - 2002	2002 - 2004	2004 - 2006	2006 - 2008	2008 - 2010	2010 - 2012	2012 - 2014	2014 - 2016	2016–Present
President	Ed Wasserman	Robert Cook	Suzanne MacDonald	Tom Zentall	Michael Brown	Marcia Spetch	Jonathon Crystal	Jeffrey Katz	Debbie Kelly	Olga Lazareva

== Meetings ==
One of the primary functions of the society is sponsorship of the annual Conference on Comparative Cognition (CO3). The first informal meeting of the conference was held in March, 1994 in Melbourne, Florida. With the founding of the CCS in 1999, CO3 became a formalized conference. Over the years, CO3 has included talks on over 100 species by scientists from over a dozen countries. CO3 brings together new and returning researchers from across the world who present talks and posters about their work.

Each year at CO3, an eminent researcher in the field is honoured with the CCS Research Award and asked to give a master lecture. Past honourees include Sara Shettleworth, Alex Kacelnik, Alan Kamil, Thomas Zentall, Edward Wasserman, Karen Hollis and Ron Weisman. A special paper session is held discussing the impact of the honouree on the scientific community each year, and an issue of the journal Behavioural Processes including articles related to the talks at the special session is published.

Beginning in 2008 CCS has sponsored a fall meeting in cooperation with the Psychonomic Society. The fall meeting coincides with the annual meeting of the Psychonomic society.

== On-Line Journal ==
CCS publishes the online journal, Comparative Cognition and Behavior Reviews. Comparative Cognition & Behavior Reviews is an open-access, peer-reviewed electronic journal of substantive reviews and constructive critiques in the area of animal cognition. The topics for these reviews and critiques include all aspects of research on cognition, perception, learning, memory and behavior in animals.

Current issue: Volume 12 (2017) - Co-editors: Marcia Spetch, Christopher Sturdy, & Anna Wilkinson.

== E-Books ==
The CCS has also published two electronic books: Avian Visual Cognition and Animal Spatial Cognition: Comparative, Neural, and Computational Approaches.

== Proceedings ==
Beginning with the ninth annual CO3 conference, the society has published the proceedings of the conference online.
