= Alex Kacelnik =

British zoologist

Alejandro "Alex" Kacelnik, FRS (born 14 December 1946) is an Argentine-British zoologist, professor of behavioural ecology at Oxford University and E.P. Abraham Fellow of Pembroke College, Oxford. Kacelnik heads the Behavioural Ecology Research Group at Oxford. The author of more than 200 peer reviewed publications, his research focuses on the evolution of behaviour and mathematical modelling. His work uses an interdisciplinary approach, combining data and methods from zoology, psychology and economic theory. In 2011 Kacelnik was honoured by the Comparative Cognition Society for his contributions to the field of animal cognition. He has also received the Cogito Prize for interdisciplinary research linking the natural and social sciences, shared with Professor Ernst Fehr of the University of Zurich, the de Robertis Medal of the Argentinian Society of Neurosciences, and the Raíces ("Roots") Prize for contributions to international collaborations between Argentinian and other scientists.

Kacelnik is best known for his research on tool-making and tool-use in New Caledonian crows. However, his research has involved many other species of animals, especially starlings and cowbirds, and he has made many contributions to optimal foraging theory, mechanisms of animal decision making, and brood parasitism.
