= Memory & Cognition =

- Discipline: Cognitive science
- Language: English
- Edited by: Bennett Schwartz, Florida International University

Publication details
- History: 1973-present
- Publisher: Springer Science+Business Media on behalf of the Psychonomic Society
- Frequency: 8/year
- Impact factor: 2.482 (2021)

Standard abbreviations
- ISO 4: Mem. Cogn.

Indexing
- CODEN: MYCGAO
- ISSN: 0090-502X (print); 1532-5946 (web)
- LCCN: 73645334
- OCLC no.: 907921555

Links
- Journal homepage; Online archive; Journal page at society's website

Memory & Cognition is a peer-reviewed academic journal covering cognitive science. It is published by Springer Science+Business Media on behalf of the Psychonomic Society and was established in 1973. The editor-in-chief is Bennett Schwartz (Florida International University).

== Abstracting and indexing information ==
The journal is abstracted and indexed in:

- CINAHL
- Current Contents/Social & Behavioral Sciences
- EBSCO databases
- Embase
- EMCare
- FRANCIS
- Index Medicus/MEDLINE/PubMed
- International Bibliography of Periodical Literature
- MLA International Bibliography
- PASCAL
- ProQuest databases
- PsycINFO
- Scopus
- Social Sciences Citation Index

According to the Journal Citation Reports, the journal has a 2014 impact factor of 2.457.
