= Alan Kamil =

American experimental psychologist

Alan C. Kamil is an American experimental psychologist. He is the Director, School of Biological Sciences and George Holmes Professor of Biological Sciences and Psychology at the University of Nebraska–Lincoln. Kamil's work focusses on the evolution of memory and adaptive specializations of learning in many animal species, especially the Clark's nutcracker and other birds. Kamil has published peer reviewed articles on both theoretical aspects of comparative psychology and animal cognition, and on empirical studies of animal learning and memory. In 2013 Kamil was honoured by the Comparative Cognition Society for his contributions to the study of animal cognition.
