= Karen Hollis =

American psychologist and academic

Karen Hollis is an American professor of psychology and education at Mount Holyoke College in South Hadley Massachusetts. Hollis's research focusses on an evolutionary approach to learning and cognition in non human animals. She served as the head of the American Psychological Association's sixth division (behavioural neuroscience and comparative psychology) from 2006 to 2007 and the third division (experimental psychology] from 2010 to 2011. Hollis was the first woman to head the third division. She has served on the editorial boards of many journals, including Animal Behaviour, Animal Learning & Behavior and the Journal of Comparative Psychology.

Hollis received a B.A. from Slippery Rock State College (now Slippery Rock University of Pennsylvania) and a Ph.D. from the University of Minnesota.

In 2016 Hollis was honored Comparative Cognition Society for her contributions to the study of animal cognition.
