= Journal of Experimental Psychology =

- Discipline: Experimental psychology
- Language: English

Publication details
- History: 1916–1975
- Publisher: American Psychological Association (United States)
- Frequency: Bimonthly

Standard abbreviations
- ISO 4: J. Exp. Psychol.

Indexing
- ISSN: 0096-3445
- LCCN: 76643075
- OCLC no.: 936784767

The Journal of Experimental Psychology was a bimonthly peer-reviewed academic journal published by American Psychological Association. Established in 1916, it became the association's largest and most prestigious journal by the mid-1970s, when dissatisfaction with publication lag led the organization to restructure the journal. Beginning in 1975, it was split into four independently edited and distributed successor journals, with an additional successor journal being added in 1995.

== History ==
The first issue was published by the Psychological Review Company, Princeton, New Jersey.

The following successor journals are currently published:

- Journal of Experimental Psychology: General
- Journal of Experimental Psychology: Learning, Memory, and Cognition
- Journal of Experimental Psychology: Human Perception and Performance
- Journal of Experimental Psychology: Animal Learning and Cognition
- Journal of Experimental Psychology: Applied
