= Cognitive, Affective, & Behavioral Neuroscience =

- Discipline: Cognitive neuroscience
- Language: English
- Edited by: Diego A. Pizzagalli, Harvard Medical School

Publication details
- Former name: Psychobiology
- History: 1973–2000 as Psychobiology/Physiological Psychology 2001-Present as Cognitive, Affective & Behavioral Neuroscience
- Publisher: Springer Science+Business Media on behalf of the Psychonomic Society
- Frequency: 5/year (Feb, Apr, Jun, Aug, Oct)
- Impact factor: 3.526 (2021)

Standard abbreviations
- ISO 4: Cogn. Affect. Behav. Neurosci.

Indexing
- CODEN: CABNC2
- ISSN: 1530-7026 (print); 1531-135X (web)
- LCCN: 00214924
- OCLC no.: 44447951
- Psychobiology
- ISSN: 0889-6313

Links
- Journal homepage; Online archive; Online archive of Psychobiology; Journal page at society's website

Cognitive, Affective, & Behavioral Neuroscience is peer-reviewed scientific journal covering research on behavior and brain processes in humans. It was established in 1973 as Psychobiology and received its current title in 2001, with volume numbering restarting at 1. The journal is published by Springer Science+Business Media on behalf of the Psychonomic Society and the editor-in-chief is Diego A. Pizzagalli (Harvard Medical School).

== Abstracting and indexing ==
The journal is abstracted and indexed in:

- Science Citation Index Expanded
- PubMed/MEDLINE
- Scopus
- PsycINFO
- Embase
- EBSCO databases
- Academic Search
- Biological Abstracts
- BIOSIS Previews
- Elsevier Biobase
- FRANCIS
- PASCAL

According to the Journal Citation Reports, the journal has a 2020 impact factor of 3.282.
