= Psychonomics =

Application of quantitative and mathematical analyses to experimental psychology

Psychonomics is a field of cognitive science and psychology characterized by the use of mathematical modeling to discovering the laws (Greek: 'nomos') that govern the workings of the mind (Greek: 'psyche'). The field is directly related to experimental psychology. The word is used most prominently by the Psychonomic Society, a society of experimental psychologists. It is closely related to psychophysics.
