= Neuroepistemology =

Field of study

Neuroepistemology is an empirical approach to epistemology—the study of knowledge in a general, philosophical sense—which is informed by modern neuroscience, especially the study of the structure and operation of the brain involving neural networks and neuronal epistemology. Philosopher Patricia Churchland has written about the topic and, in her book Brain-Wise, characterised the problem as "how meat knows". Georg Northoff, in his Philosophy of the Brain, wrote that it "focuses on direct linkage between the brain on one hand and epistemic abilities and inabilities on the other."

== Assumptive framework ==
The postmodernist Menachem Mazabow wrote that it "is necessary... to state the set of assumptions that are seen as fundamental to any neuro-epistemological inquiry." These include:

1. The significance of revealing the suppositions which influence one’s behavior (the self-reflexive connection between meaning and behavior).
2. The larger socio-politico-historical contextual effects on one’s individual assumptions.
3. The power relations deeply rooted in the dominant discourses in a field and their overpowering effect on different modes of thought.
4. The unavoidably context-dependent and subjective nature of all concepts, compared to objective systems of validity.
5. The importance of examining embedded assumptions and of concentrating on the association between idea and context.
6. The affirmation that appropriate theorizing is a certainty of our nature as language observers and directing theorists in the direction of improving awareness of their fundamental responsibility.
7. The assertion that the concept of efficacy, instead of objective validity should be the fulcrum in the evaluation of theory.

== Application ==
Brown has noted the "tacit bias" in any observation, which is rooted in "assumptions on the nature of mind" that shape the research, and for Hanlan and Brown, theory does not arise from data alone. Crick has stated that it is impossible to pursue a difficult programme of research in neuroscience without some preconceived ideas, seen as inevitable by Churchland. Stein, Brailowsky and Will have opined that such preconceptions about the central nervous system have tended to hamper research in certain areas.
