= Lloyd Humphreys =

American psychologist

Lloyd G. Humphreys
- Born: December 12, 1913
- Died: September 7, 2003 (aged 89)
- Education: University of Oregon; Indiana University; Stanford University
- Scientific career
- Fields: Psychology

Lloyd Girton Humphreys (December 12, 1913 – September 7, 2003) was an American differential psychologist and methodologist who focused on assessing individual differences in human behavior. His work is among the most widely cited in intelligence research, and he received awards in this field.

== Early life and education ==
Born in Lorane, Oregon, Humphreys earned his undergraduate degree at the University of Oregon in 1935, a master's from Indiana University in 1936, where he first learned about factor analysis, then received his doctorate at Stanford in 1938, studying under Ernest Hilgard. His dissertation on the partial reinforcement effect (or the Humphreys effect), is considered a classic in the field.

== Career ==
His first position was at Northwestern University (1939–1945). He was a Carnegie Fellow in Anthropology (1941–1942, Columbia University) during that time, then taught at the University of Washington (1946–1948) and Stanford (1948–1952). He then took a post as Research Director, Personnel Laboratory, for the United States Air Force (1951–1957). He then spent the remainder of his career at the University of Illinois at Urbana-Champaign (1957–1984).

Humphreys argued that much psychological research fails to replicate because of inadequate sample sizes, because correlations fluctuate when Ns are small. His own empirical research typically involved large-scale longitudinal studies such as Project Talent.

In the 1970s, Humphreys chaired the American Psychological Association's Task Force on ability and achievement testing. He deemed a general intelligence test "the single most important test that can be administered for vocational guidance purposes" (Humphreys, 1985, p. 211). He also coined the concept "inadequate learning syndrome" (ILS) and argued it was a more important social problem than the AIDS epidemic (Humphreys, 1988).

Amid the controversy generated by publication of The Bell Curve in 1994, Humphreys wrote a target article (Humphreys, 1994), which stimulated a series of comments by a number of prominent scholars in the field. He generated further controversy by accepting funding from the Pioneer Fund. He was also one of 52 signatories on "Mainstream Science on Intelligence," an editorial written by Linda Gottfredson and published in the Wall Street Journal, which defended the findings on intelligence in The Bell Curve.

== Selected works ==
- Humphreys LG (1939). The effect of random alternation of reinforcement on the acquisition and extinction of conditioned eyelid reactions. Journal of Experimental Psychology, 25, 141–158.
- Humphreys, L. G. (1985). General intelligence: An integration of factor, test, and simplex theory. In B. B. Wolman (Ed.), Handbook of intelligence ( pp. 201–224). New York: Wiley.
- Humphreys, L. G. (1988). Trends in levels of academic achievement of blacks and other minorities. Intelligence, 12, 231–260.
- Humphreys, L. G. (1994). Intelligence from the standpoint of a (pragmatic) behaviorist. Psychological Inquiry, 5, 179–192.
