= Learning & Behavior =

- Discipline: Neuroscience, psychology
- Language: English
- Edited by: Lauren M. Guillette, University of Alberta

Publication details
- Former name(s): Animal Learning & Behavior
- History: 1973–present
- Publisher: Springer Science+Business Media on behalf of the Psychonomic Society
- Frequency: Quarterly
- Impact factor: 1.926 (2021)

Standard abbreviations
- ISO 4: Learn. Behav.

Indexing
- ISSN: 1543-4494 (print); 1543-4508 (web)
- LCCN: 2003212080
- OCLC no.: 890337525

Links
- Journal homepage; Online archive; Journal page at society's website

Learning & Behavior is a quarterly peer-reviewed scientific journal published by Springer Science+Business Media on behalf of the Psychonomic Society. The journal was established in 1973 as Animal Learning & Behavior, obtaining its current title in 2003. The founding editor-in-chief was Abram Amsel, the current editor is Lauren M. Guillette (University of Alberta). The journal covers research into fundamental processes underlying learning and behavior in animals (including humans).

== Abstracting and indexing ==
The journal is abstracted and indexed in:

- Science Citation Index
- Social Sciences Citation Index
- Index medicus/MEDLINE/PubMed
- Scopus
- PsycINFO
- Astrophysics Data System
- Embase
- CAB International
- Academic OneFile
- Academic Search
- Aquatic Sciences and Fisheries Abstracts
- Biological Abstracts
- BIOSIS Previews
- CAB Abstracts
- CSA Environmental Sciences
- Current Contents/Social & Behavioral Sciences
- Current Contents/Life Sciences
- Elsevier BIOBASE
- FRANCIS
- Global Health
- The Zoological Record

According to the Journal Citation Reports, the journal has a 2021 impact factor of 1.986.
