= Journal of Experimental Psychology: Human Perception and Performance =

- Discipline: Experimental Psychology
- Language: English
- Edited by: Isabel Gauthier

Publication details
- History: 1975-present
- Publisher: American Psychological Association (United States)
- Frequency: Bimonthly
- Impact factor: 2.3 (2024)

Standard abbreviations
- ISO 4: J. Exp. Psychol. Hum. Percept. Perform.

Indexing
- ISSN: 0096-1523 (print); 1939-1277 (web)
- OCLC no.: 610205796

Links
- Journal homepage; Online access

The Journal of Experimental Psychology: Human Perception and Performance is a peer-reviewed academic journal published by the American Psychological Association. It was established in 1975 as an independent section of the Journal of Experimental Psychology and covers research in experimental psychology. The journal "publishes studies on perception, control of action, perceptual aspects of language processing, and related cognitive processes."

The journal has implemented the Transparency and Openness Promotion (TOP) Guidelines. The TOP Guidelines provide structure to research planning and reporting and aim to make research more transparent, accessible, and reproducible.

The journal includes three types of articles:

- Observations
- Reports
- Commentary

The editor-in-chief is Isabel Gauthier (Vanderbilt University).

== Abstracting and indexing ==
The journal is abstracted and indexed by MEDLINE/PubMed and the Social Sciences Citation Index. According to the Journal Citation Reports, the journal has a 2024 impact factor of 2.3.
