= Journal of Experimental Psychology: Animal Learning and Cognition =

- Discipline: Experimental Psychology
- Language: English
- Edited by: Jonathon D. Crystal

Publication details
- History: 1975-present
- Publisher: American Psychological Association (United States)
- Frequency: Quarterly
- Impact factor: 1.5 (2024)

Standard abbreviations
- ISO 4: J. Exp. Psychol. Animal Learn. Cogn.

Indexing
- ISSN: 2329-8456 (print); 2329-8464 (web)
- LCCN: 2013203309
- OCLC no.: 851372163

Links
- Journal homepage; Online access

The Journal of Experimental Psychology: Animal Learning and Cognition is a peer-reviewed academic journal published by the American Psychological Association. It covers research in experimental psychology, specifically pertaining to all aspects of animal behavior processes. It was established in 1975 as the Journal of Experimental Psychology: Animal Behavior Processes (J. Exp. Psychol. Anim. Behav. Process.), an independent section of the Journal of Experimental Psychology. In 2014, the journal subtitle was changed to Animal Learning and Cognition. The editor-in-chief is Jonathon D. Crystal.

The journal has implemented the Transparency and Openness Promotion (TOP) Guidelines. The TOP Guidelines provide structure to research planning and reporting and aim to make research more transparent, accessible, and reproducible.

== Abstracting and indexing ==
The journal is abstracted and indexed by MEDLINE/PubMed and the Social Sciences Citation Index. According to the Journal Citation Reports, the journal has a 2024 impact factor of 2.7.
