= Journal of Experimental Psychology: Learning, Memory, and Cognition =

US journal

- Discipline: Experimental Psychology
- Language: English
- Edited by: Jeffrey Starns

Publication details
- Former names: Journal of Experimental Psychology: Human Learning and Memory
- History: 1975-present
- Publisher: American Psychological Association (United States)
- Frequency: Bimonthly
- Impact factor: 2.1 (2024)

Standard abbreviations
- ISO 4: J. Exp. Psychol. Learn. Mem. Cogn.

Indexing
- ISSN: 0278-7393 (print); 1939-1285 (web)
- OCLC no.: 7949766

Links
- Journal homepage; Online access

The Journal of Experimental Psychology: Learning, Memory, and Cognition is a peer-reviewed academic journal published by the American Psychological Association. It was established in 1975 as an independent section of the Journal of Experimental Psychology and covers research in experimental psychology. More specifically, the journal "publishes original experimental studies on basic processes of cognition, learning, memory, imagery, concept formation, problem solving, decision making, thinking, reading, and language processing". The current editor-in-chief is Jeffrey Starns.

The journal has implemented the Transparency and Openness Promotion (TOP) Guidelines. The TOP Guidelines provide structure to research planning and reporting and aim to make research more transparent, accessible, and reproducible.

== History ==
The journal was formerly titled the Journal of Experimental Psychology: Human Learning and Memory. In 1980, the editor of Human Learning and Memory, Richard M. Shiffrin, announced that he intended to "broaden the scope of the journal to include a more general set of topics in human cognition", and that the journal would be renamed Learning, Memory, and Cognition. The last issue of Human Learning and Memory was 1981 volume 7 issue 6. Learning, Memory, and Cognition started in 1982 as volume 8, issue 1.

== Abstracting and indexing ==
The journal is abstracted and indexed by MEDLINE/PubMed and the Social Sciences Citation Index. According to the Journal Citation Reports, the journal has a 2024 impact factor of 2.1.
