= Edward Wasserman =

American psychologist

Edward A. ('Ed') Wasserman is a professor of psychology at the University of Iowa. His research focusses on comparing cognitive processes in human and non-human animals. Wasserman has over 250 publications in peer-reviewed academic journals. In 2015 Wasserman was honoured by the Comparative Cognition Society for his contributions to the study of animal cognition.

== Selected publications ==
- Comparative Cognition Experimental Explorations of Animal Intelligence (with Thomas Zentall, 2006)
