= Michael J. Tarr =

American cognitive neuroscientist

Michael J. Tarr is an American cognitive neuroscientist who currently holds the Kavčić-Moura Professorship in Cognitive and Brain Science. He is a professor at Carnegie Mellon University, a recipient of the APA Distinguished Scientific Award for an Early Career Contribution to Psychology from the American Psychological Association in 1997, a recipient of the Troland Award from the National Academy of Sciences in 2003, a Guggenheim Fellow in 2007, and an Elected Fellow of the American Association for the Advancement of Science.

== Education ==
Tarr is a 1980 graduate of Taylor Allderdice High School. He earned his B.A at Cornell University in 1984 and his Ph.D. at Massachusetts Institute of Technology.

== Research ==
He is an expert in human visual perception, object recognition, and NeuroAI. His work focuses on high-level vision and representation in both natural and artificial systems. His highest cited paper is Activation of the middle fusiform 'face area' increases with expertise in recognizing novel objects which has been cited over 1700 times, according to Google Scholar.

== Recent Publications ==
- Sarch, G, Saha, S, Khandelwal, N, Jain, A, Tarr, MJ, Kumar, A, Fragkiadaki, K (2025) Grounded Reinforcement Learning for Visual Reasoning. The Thirty-ninth Annual Conference on Neural Information Processing Systems (NeurIPS).
- Yu, M, Nan, M, Adeli, H, Prince, JS, Pyles, JA, Wehbe, L, Henderson, MM, Tarr, MJ, Luo, AF (2025) Meta-Learning an In-Context Transformer Model of Human Higher Visual Cortex. The Thirty-ninth Annual Conference on Neural Information Processing Systems (NeurIPS).
- Zhou, Y, Tarr, MJ, Yurovsky, D (2025) Quantifying the roles of visual, linguistic, and visual-linguistic complexity in noun and verb acquisition. PLOS ONE. 20(5): e0321973.
- Yeung, J, Luo, A, Sarch GH, Henderson, MM, Ramanan, D, Tarr, MJ (2025) Reanimating Images using Neural Representations of Dynamic Stimuli. Conference on Computer Vision and Pattern Recognition (CVPR Oral).
- Henderson, MM, Tarr, MJ, Wehbe, L (2025) Origins of food selectivity in human visual cortex. Trends in Neurosciences.
- Luo, AF, Yeung, J, Zawar, R, Dewan, S, Henderson, MM, Wehbe, L, Tarr, MJ (2025) Brain Mapping with Dense Features: Grounding Cortical Semantic Selectivity in Natural Images With Vision Transformers. International Conference on Learning Representations (ICLR).
- Sarch, GH, Jang, L, Tarr, MJ, Cohen, WW, Marino, K, Fragkiadaki, K. (2024) VLM Agents Generate Their Own Memories: Distilling Experience into Embodied Programs of Thought. Neural Information Processing Systems (NeurIPS Spotlight), 38. arXiv
- Zhou, Y, Liu, E, Neubig, G, Tarr, MJ, Wehbe, L (2024) Divergences between language models and human brains. Neural Information Processing Systems (NeurIPS), 38.
- Luo, AF, Henderson, MM, Tarr, MJ, Wehbe, L (2024) BrainSCUBA: Fine-Grained Natural Language Captions of Visual Cortex Selectivity. International Conference on Learning Representations (ICLR).
- Luo, AF, Henderson, MM, Wehbe, L, Tarr, MJ (2023) Brain diffusion for visual exploration: Cortical discovery using large scale generative models. Neural Information Processing Systems (NeurIPS Oral), 37.
- Wang, AY, Kay, K, Naselaris, T, Tarr, MJ, Wehbe, L (2023) Better models of human high-level visual cortex emerge from natural language supervision with a large and diverse dataset. Nat Mach Intell 5, 1415–1426.

== Highly Cited Publications ==
- Gauthier, I, Tarr, MJ, Anderson, AW, Skudlarski, P, & Gore, JC (1999). Activation of the middle fusiform “face area” increases with expertise in recognizing novel objects. Nature Neuroscience, 2(6), 568-573.
- Gauthier, I, & Tarr, MJ (1997). Becoming a “Greeble” expert: Exploring mechanisms for face recognition. Vision Research, 37(12), 1673-1682.
- Tarr, MJ, & Pinker, S (1989) Mental rotation and orientation-dependence in shape recognition. Cognitive Psychology, 21(2), 233-282.
- Tarr, MJ, & Gauthier, I (2000) FFA: A Flexible Fusiform Area for subordinate-level visual processing automatized by expertise. Nature Neuroscience, 3(8), 764-769.
- Tarr, MJ (1995). Rotating objects to recognize them: A case study of the role of viewpoint dependency in the recognition of three-dimensional objects. Psychonomic Bulletin and Review, 2, 55-82.
