= Thomas Zentall =

Thomas R. Zentall is a professor of psychology at the University of Kentucky. His research focusses on learning and memory in non-human animals. A former president of both the Midwestern Psychological Association and the Eastern Psychological Association, Zentall has over 300 publications in peer-reviewed journals. In 2014 Zentall was honoured by the Comparative Cognition Society for his contributions to the study of animal cognition.

He is a fellow of the Society of Experimental Psychologists.
