= Journal of Experimental Psychology: General =

- Discipline: Experimental Psychology
- Language: English
- Edited by: Sarah Brown-Schmidt

Publication details
- History: 1916-present
- Publisher: American Psychological Association (United States)
- Frequency: Bimonthly
- Impact factor: 3.5 (2024)

Standard abbreviations
- ISO 4: J. Exp. Psychol. Gen.

Indexing
- ISSN: 0096-3445 (print); 1939-2222 (web)
- OCLC no.: 2441503

Links
- Journal homepage; Online access

The Journal of Experimental Psychology: General is a peer-reviewed academic journal published by the American Psychological Association. It was established in 1975 as an independent section of the Journal of Experimental Psychology and covers research in experimental psychology.

The journal has implemented the Transparency and Openness Promotion (TOP) Guidelines. The TOP Guidelines provide structure to research planning and reporting and aim to make research more transparent, accessible, and reproducible.

The journal may include articles on the following topics:

- social processes
- developmental processes
- psychopathology
- neuroscience
- computational modeling

The current editor-in-chief is Sarah Brown-Schmidt.

== Abstracting and indexing ==
The journal is abstracted and indexed by MEDLINE/PubMed and the Social Sciences Citation Index. According to the Journal Citation Reports, the journal has a 2024 impact factor of 3.5.
