= Psychonomic Society =

Society for experimental psychology

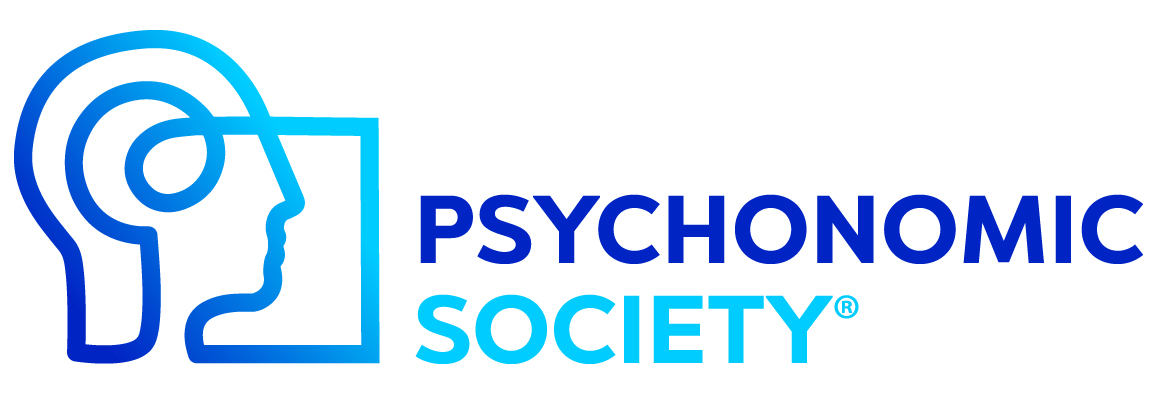
- Formation: March 31, 1960; 66 years ago
- Type: Scientific society
- Legal status: 501(c)(3) nonprofit organization
- Headquarters: 4300 Duraform Lane
- Location: Windsor, Wisconsin United States
- Members: 4,500+
- 2026 Chair: Myra Fernandes
- Key people: Governing Board, Louis Shomette, Executive Director & CEO
- Website: www.psychonomic.org

The Psychonomic Society is an international scientific society of over 4,500 scientists in the field of experimental psychology. The mission of the Psychonomic Society is to foster the science of cognition through the advancement and communication of basic research in experimental psychology and allied sciences. It is open to international researchers, and almost 40% of members are based outside of North America. Although open to all areas of experimental and cognitive psychology, its members typically study areas such as learning, memory, attention, motivation, perception, categorization, decision making, and psycholinguistics. Its name is taken from the word psychonomics, meaning "the science of the laws of the mind".

== History ==
The Psychonomic Society was founded by a group of experimental psychologists during a meeting in Chicago, Illinois, USA in December 1959. The main goal was to create a society that would support open communication about psychological science with minimal structure. An interesting article about the society's inception and history can be found in Dewsbury, D. A., & Bolles, R. C. (1995). The founding of the Psychonomic Society. Psychonomic Bulletin & Review, 2, 216-233.

The society was founded in 1959 by a small group of experimental psychologists, who recognized the need for a distinct society that would support open and accessible communications about new research on experimental and cognitive psychology. They broke away from the dominant association of the day, the American Psychological Association, to create a smaller, more select and less formal society with a minimal structure and sole focus on experimental work rather than practice-related research. Their early success in publishing a journal to report on the latest experimental research paved the way for the Psychonomic Society ("Society" or "PS") to ultimately self-publish six distinct journals.

However, psychology is a science that is constantly evolving, and the past ten years have seen dramatic changes and an expansion of the field, particularly at its juncture with neuroscience. New and more specialized societies have been created to focus on particular types of science, much as the Psychonomic Society was created in 1959. There has also been a dramatic shift for the society as it embraced the modern publishing process, divested itself of its own publishing house, and contracted with Springer Publishing to produce its six journals. There was also a transition of society management from internal staff to an external management firm. In addition, the publishing contract brought in a new and substantial revenue stream that has put the Psychonomic Society in a position to consider various new programs.

Upon establishment, the governing board of the society undertook an assessment of where the society stood at present and what its goals should be for the future. They wanted to make sure the Psychonomic Society retained the qualities that its members value and yet is nimble enough to change with the times. A strategic planning process was used to chart a course for the society for the next decade.

Its organizing committee included: Wilfred J. Brogden, William K. Estes, Frank A. Geldard, Clarence H. Graham, Lloyd G. Humphreys, Clifford T. Morgan, William D. Neff, Kenneth W. Spence, Stanley Smith Stevens, Benton J. Underwood, and William S. Verplanck (Secretary-Treasurer).

Past chairs of the society's governing board have included Clifford T. Morgan and Lloyd G. Humphreys.

== Membership ==
The society includes over 4,500 members, including graduate student members, and beginning in 2023, undergraduate student members. Emeritus, Fellows, and Full Members hold a Ph.D. or equivalent degrees in their field. To be eligible for Fellow status, researchers must have published significant research other than their doctoral dissertation.

Members of the Society are experimental and experimental psychologists and include some of the most distinguished researchers in the field.

Many members of the society are concerned with the application of psychology to health, technology and education, and many use converging methods such as neuroscience and computational science to achieve their research goals. A common underlying thread of the society’s research is the use of behavioral techniques to better understand mental functioning. The society and its members perform and promote the basic science of behavior in areas such as memory, learning, problem solving, action planning, language, and perception that connect with other fields of research.

The society works closely with other societies that focus on allied fields of research. The society also support advocacy for research funding by working in partnership with the Federation of Associations in Behavioral & Brain Sciences (FABBS).

== Meetings ==
The Psychonomic Society convenes every year in the fall, usually November. Normally, around 2,600 people attend, with 1,300 papers and posters presented.

The first meeting was held at the University of Chicago in 1960, in conjunction with the American Psychological Association meeting. Many of the meetings of the society have occurred in Chicago (in the 1960s) and St. Louis (in the 1970s). In recent years, the meeting has moved between major convention cities in the USA and Canada. There are occasional international meetings of the society, the first of which was held jointly with the UK Experimental Psychology Society in Edinburgh, UK in 2007. Starting in 2001, the meeting instituted a keynote address honoring distinguished members.

== Journals ==
The Psychonomic Society publishes seven peer-reviewed journals covering experimental psychology:

- Attention, Perception, & Psychophysics (2009–present) (formerly Perception & Psychophysics)
- Behavior Research Methods (2004–present) (formerly Behavior Research Methods, Instruments, & Computers)
- Cognitive, Affective, & Behavioral Neuroscience (2001–present)
- Cognitive Research: Principles & Implications (2015–present)
- Learning & Behavior (2003–present) (formerly Animal Learning & Behavior)
- Memory & Cognition (1973–present)
- Psychonomic Bulletin & Review (1994–present)

== Retired journals ==
The Society previously published: Psychonomic Science (1964-1972) Bulletin of the Psychonomic Society (1973-1993).

== Abstracts ==
Beginning with the 37th annual meeting, abstracts of the society's annual meeting are published in Abstracts of the Psychonomic Society, starting with Volume 1 (in 1996), and numbered consecutively. Prior to this, the abstracts were published in the 'Program of the Annual Meeting of the Psychonomic Society.'

== Awards ==
The Psychonomic Society provides a range of awards with the "aim of recognizing individuals who have made outstanding contributions to advancing cognitive science". Each year, the Society recognizes its members and promising students with the following awards and honors:

- Clifford T. Morgan Distinguished Leadership Award
- Mid-Career Award
- Early Career Award
- Best Article Award
- Graduate Conference Award
- J. Frank Yates Student Conference Award
- Psychonomic Society/Women in Cognitive Science Travel and Networking Award for Junior Scientists

== Bibliography ==
- Dewsbury, D. A., & Bolles, R. C. (1995) The founding of the Psychonomic Society. Psychonomic Bulletin and Review 2, 216-233.
- Dewsbury, D. A. (1996) History of the Psychonomic Society II: The Journal Publishing Program. Psychonomic Bulletin & Review 3, 322-338.
