= Rescorla =

Rescorla may refer to:

== People ==
- Leslie Rescorla (1945–2020), American psychologist
- Rick Rescorla (1939–2001), British and American soldier, and security chief for Morgan Stanley who died in the 9/11 terrorist attack
- Robert A. Rescorla (1940–2020), American psychologist

== Places ==
- Rescorla, Cornwall, village

== Science ==
- Rescorla–Wagner model, description of the process of psychological conditioning
