= Achenbach =

Achenbach is a German surname. Notable people with the surname include:

- Andreas Achenbach (1815–1910), German painter
- Ernst Achenbach (1909–1991), German diplomat and politician
- Gerd B. Achenbach (born 1947), German philosopher
- Heinrich von Achenbach (1829–1899), Prussian politician, agriculture minister
- Jan D. Achenbach (1935–2020), American professor at Northwestern University
- Joel Achenbach (born 1960), American journalist
- Max Alvary (1856–1898), originally Maximilian Achenbach, German tenor
- Oswald Achenbach (1827–1905), German painter
- Thomas M. Achenbach (1940–2023), American psychiatrist
- Timo Achenbach (born 1982), German footballer

== Other uses ==
- Achenbach House, historic place in New Jersey, United States
- Achenbach System of Empirically Based Assessment
- Paroxysmal hand hematoma, Achenbach syndrome, "blue finger"
