= Alexandra Horowitz =

American author and professor

Alexandra Horowitz is an associate professor of Professional Practice within the English and Psychology Departments at Barnard College. Horowitz is the director of the Horowitz Dog Cognition Lab at Barnard. She is the author of the New York Times bestseller, Inside of a Dog: What Dogs See, Smell, and Know, which introduced the idea of understanding the umwelt, or self-world, of dogs. A revised and updated version of the book was published in 2025.

== Early life and education ==
Horowitz was born in Philadelphia, Pennsylvania. Her father was a practicing attorney and her mother was a trained lawyer and oboist. In her early childhood, Horowitz and her family moved to Golden, Colorado, where she completed her primary and secondary education. She received her B.A. in philosophy from the University of Pennsylvania where she was a member of the Philomathean Society. Later, Horowitz completed her post-baccalaureate training at Columbia University, where she pursued her interest in animal cognition. Horowitz had a sensitivity toward animals from an early age, but her academic curiosity flourished during her time at Columbia.

Horowitz went on to earn her M.S. and Ph.D. in Cognitive Science from the University of California at San Diego. While studying animal cognition, she decided to study play behavior in dogs after observing her dog, Pumpernickel. She has cited the work of Marc Bekoff and Colin Allen in her decision to study communication and theory of mind through dog play.

== Research and career ==
Prior to her graduate education, Horowitz worked as a lexicographer for Merriam-Webster. She contributed as a definer for Merriam-Webster’s Collegiate Dictionary, which was published in 1991. Horowitz then began work as a fact-checker at The New Yorker in New York City. She credits her time fact-checking work by the neuroscientist and author Oliver Sacks as an influence in her decision to study cognitive science.

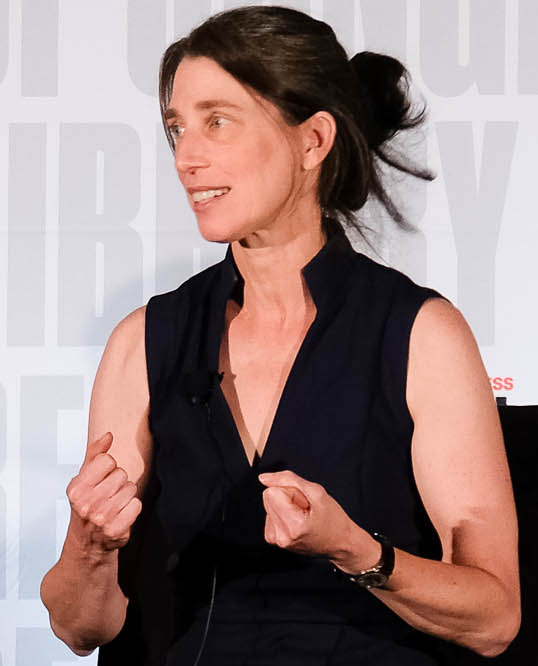
Horowitz at the 2019 National Book Festival

Horowitz is an instructor of dog cognition, nonfiction writing, and oral storytelling. In addition to being a professor, Horowitz is also the PI of the Dog Cognition Lab at Barnard, focusing on analyzing the behavior and psychology of owned dogs. Her research has provided insight into dogs’ sense of self, their sense of space, and the way they use their olfactory system to make sense of the world around them. Her research on the perceived emotion of guilt commonly displayed by dogs has shown that this look is not reflecting the dog feeling guilty but rather attempting to act submissively to avoid punishment. Horowitz's work guides dog owners on how to improve their relationships with their dogs, advising owners to tailor certain kinds of play to the dog and allow dogs to explore their olfactory worlds.

Outside of her work in the lecture hall and the lab, Horowitz has published five books. Her most recent work, The Year of the Puppy, follows a dog throughout the first year of life, a year which Horowitz describes as an especially pivotal time in development. Her writing and research have received high acclaim, with book reviewers calling it precise, engaging, entertaining, and uplifting. She has said that she aims to create books that are accessible to a younger audience to foster a sense of curiosity and empathy toward non-human animals in the younger generation. She also created the podcast Off-Leash, with episodes highlighting conversations about dog behavior and cognition shared between Horowitz and a notable guest as they took their dogs for a walk.

== Selected works ==
=== Publications ===
- The Year of the Puppy: How Dogs Become Themselves (2022). Viking, New York, NY. ISBN 978-0593298008.
- Our Dogs, Ourselves: The Story of a Singular Bond (2019). Scribner, New York, NY. ISBN 978-1501175008.
- Being a Dog: Following the Dog Into a World of Smell (2016). Scribner, New York, NY. ISBN 978-1476796024.
- Inside of a Dog: What Dogs See, Smell, and Know—Young readers edition (2016). Simon & Schuster, New York, NY. ISBN 978-1481450942.
- Domestic Dog Cognition and Behavior: The Scientific Study of Canis familiaris (2014). Editor. Springer-Verlag, Heidelberg, Germany. ISBN 978-3642539930.
- On Looking: Eleven Walks with Expert Eyes (2013). Scribner's: New York, NY. ISBN 978-1439191255.
- Inside of a Dog: What Dogs See, Smell, and Know (2009). Scribner, New York, NY. ISBN 978-1416583431.

=== Research papers ===
- Volsche, S., Root-Gutteridge, H., Korzeniowska, A.T., Horowitz, A. (2022). Centering individual animals to improve research and citation practices. Biological Reviews. DOI: 10.1111/brv.12912
- Horowitz, A. (2021). Naming and looking. In M. DeMello (Ed.), Animals and Society: An Introduction to Human-Animal Studies, 2nd ed. Columbia University Press. DOI: 10.7312/deme19484
- Duranton, C., Horowitz, A. (2019). Let me sniff! Nosework induces positive judgment bias in pet dogs. Applied Animal Behaviour Science, 211, 61–66. DOI: 10.1016/j.applanim.2018.12.009
- Hecht, J., Horowitz, A. (2015). Seeing animals: Human preferences for dog physical attributes. Anthrozoos, 28, 153–163. DOI: 10.2752/089279315X14129350722217
- Horowitz, A., Hecht, J., & Dedrick, A. (2013). Smelling more or less: Investigating the olfactory experience of the domestic dog. Learning and Motivation, 44, 207–217. DOI: 10.1016/j.lmot.2013.02.002
- Horowitz, A. (2009). Disambiguating the "guilty look": Salient prompts to a familiar dog behaviour. Behavioural Processes, 81, 447–452. DOI: 10.1016/j.beproc.2009.03.014
- Horowitz, A. C., and Bekoff, M. (2007). Naturalizing anthropomorphism: Behavioral prompts to our humanizing of animals. Anthrozoös, 20, 23–35. DOI: 10.2752/089279307780216650
- Horowitz, A. C. (2003). Do humans ape? Or do apes human? Imitation and intention in humans and other animals. Journal of Comparative Psychology, 117, 325–336. DOI: 10.1037/0735-7036.117.3.325

== Honors and awards ==
Horowitz’ debut book, Inside of a Dog: What Dogs See, Smell, and Know, was a #1 New York Times Bestseller in 2009, and it remained on the list for 64 weeks. In 2014, she received a William James Book Award of recognition for On Looking: Eleven Walks with Expert Eyes. Horowitz’ titles geared toward children have won various awards, including the 2017 NSTA award for Outstanding Science Trade Book for Students K-12 and the 2020 Eureka! Nonfiction Children's Book Gold Award. She was a 2026 MacDowell Fellow.
