= Patrick Wilken =

Australian consciousness researcher (born 1966)

Patrick Wilken (born 17 March 1966) is an Australian consciousness researcher. He was active in the promotion of consciousness studies and is one of the founders of the Association for the Scientific Study of Consciousness.

== Biography ==
He was born in Melbourne, Australia. He completed his doctoral studies at the University of Melbourne in 2001 under the supervision of Jason Mattingley and William Webster, where he developed models of visual short-term memory. He subsequently worked for three years as a postdoctoral fellow in the laboratory of Christof Koch at the California Institute of Technology, and then for two years as a postdoctoral researcher in the laboratory of Jochen Braun, at Otto-von-Guericke University of Magdeburg.

His primary research interest was limits in information processing within high-level vision. He argued along with his collaborator Wei Ji Ma that the capacity limits commonly seen in visual short-term memory and change blindness are caused, not by a high-level bottleneck in the number items that can be attended and/or stored in memory, but by an increase in neuronal noise in stimulus representations as complexity of visual information increases.

He has been active in the promotion of consciousness as an area of academic study since the early 1990s. In 1993, he founded the electronic journal Psyche (with Kevin B Korb, Monash Univ), which in addition to publishing peer-reviewed papers and book reviews, acted as an online forum for discussion of consciousness studies via its lively mailing list Psyche-D. He acted as editor-in-chief of the journal until 2002, when he handed over executive editorship to the philosopher Tim Bayne.

After attending the first Toward a Science of Consciousness meeting in Tucson in 1994, he promoted the idea of setting up a professional organization to organize future consciousness conferences. This idea grew into the Association for the Scientific Study of Consciousness. He has been active in the organization in various ways, including being a key organizer (along with William Banks) of both the first meeting of the association in 1997, and the most recent meetings organized with Christof Koch at Caltech 2005, Geraint Rees in Oxford in 2006 and Michael Pauen in Berlin in 2009. He sat on the Board of the ASSC from its foundation, and in 2002 took over from David Chalmers as its chair; later being appointed its first executive director.

In 2007, to avoid possible conflict of interest issues associated after he was appointed an editor at Cell Press (where he worked on the journals Neuron, Trends in Cognitive Sciences and Trends in Neurosciences), he stepped down both as Director and from the Board of the ASSC. However, while at Cell Press he remained active with the ASSC (e.g., visiting Taipei twice to help the local organizers of the 2008 meeting). In late 2008, he quit his job at Cell Press, and relocated to Berlin, in order to co-organize the 2009 Berlin meeting of the ASSC. However, internal politics on the Board led to his being frozen out of further involvement with the organization he had helped to create at the completion of the meeting.

== Selected publications ==
- Bayne, Timothy; Cleermans, Axel; Wilken, Patrick, eds. (2009). The Oxford Companion to Consciousness. Oxford University Press.
- Reddy, L., Quiroga, R.Q., Wilken, P., Koch, C., Fried, I. (2006) A Single-Neuron Correlate of Change Detection and Change Blindness in the Human Medial Temporal Lobe. Current Biology, 16(20), 2066-2072
- Wilken P, Ma WJ (2004) A detection theory account of change detection. Journal of Vision, 4, 1120–1135.
