= Leon Kamin =

American psychologist (1927–2017)

- Born: Leon Judah Kamin; December 29, 1927; Taunton, Massachusetts, United States
- Died: December 22, 2017 (aged 89)
- Education: Harvard University
- Known for: Blocking effect Learning theory Race and intelligence
- Spouse: Marie-Claire Kamin
- Children: 2
- Scientific career
- Fields: Psychology
- Workplaces: McGill University; Queen's University; McMaster University; Princeton University; Northeastern University
- Thesis: The effects of the interval between signal and shock on avoidance learning (1954)
- Academic advisors: Richard Solomon

Leon J. Kamin (December 29, 1927 – December 22, 2017) was an American psychologist known for his contributions to learning theory and his critique of estimates of the heritability of IQ. He studied under Richard Solomon at Harvard and contributed several important ideas about conditioning, including the "blocking effect".

== Early life and education ==
Leon Kamin was born into a Jewish family in Taunton, Massachusetts; his father was a rabbi. Kamin studied psychology at Harvard. While a Harvard undergraduate, he joined the Communist Party, but dropped out of the party by 1950 and became a Harvard graduate student and teaching fellow.

While a graduate student, Kamin was subpoenaed by the Jenner anti-Communist Senate committee, but he refused to name others who had been (or might have been) Communists and cited his Fifth Amendment rights. As a result, Harvard refused to renew his fellowship. Next, Joe McCarthy's anti-communist committee came to Boston, looking for Communists and ex-Communists. Refusing to name names, Kamin was convicted of contempt of the Senate.

This caused job offers in the U.S. to dry up and he had to find employment in Canada, where he held positions, first at McGill University, then at Queen’s University and McMaster University (where he chaired the Psychology Department in 1957–58).

In 1968 he returned to the U.S. and chaired Princeton University's Department of Psychology and later the Psychology Department at Northeastern University in Boston, Massachusetts.

== Career ==
Kamin's most well-known contribution to learning theory was his discovery and analysis of the "blocking effect" (1969). He showed that conditioning an animal to associate a salient conditioned stimulus (CSb), such as a bright light, with a salient unconditioned stimulus (US), like a shock, is "blocked" when CSb is presented simultaneously with another conditioned stimulus (CSa) that was already conditioned to the US. (Kamin used rats in most of his research, but the effect has been found in many animals).

As department chair at Princeton and then Northeastern, Kamin’s achievements included the creation of programs to recruit and support graduate students of color.

Kamin co-authored the controversial book Not in Our Genes (1984) with geneticist Richard Lewontin and neurobiologist Steven Rose. This book attacked E. O Wilson's sociobiology and evolutionary psychology. Kamin was known in some circles for his speculation that the heritability of IQ could be "zero". (Mackintosh, 1998) In 1983, he was named a Guggenheim Fellow in psychology.

He was honorary professor of psychology at the University of Cape Town in South Africa.

=== Burt Affair ===
In March 1972 an invitation from the Princeton Psychology Department (which Kamin chaired at the time) to Richard Herrnstein (who had a few months earlier published a contentious article about race, gender, class, and intelligence) sparked controversy and threats of protest. Herrnstein canceled his visit, saying that "It would be enough for me not to come if they had placards on the wall." Kamin defended the invitation to Herrnstein, opposed the protests, and organized a meeting to discuss the controversy. The resulting debates spurred Kamin to start investigating the work on heritability of intelligence of Cyril Burt, work that Herrnstein was citing to support his views. Kamin concluded with the assertion that Burt had falsified his data. In 1974 he published his findings about Burt in the book The Science and Politics of IQ.

About 15 years after Kamin’s book was published, books by Robert F. Joynson and by Ronald Fletcher appeared that rejected Kamin’s charge of scientific fraud by Burt and proposed alternative explanations for the anomalies and discrepancies in Burt’s reported data.

=== Blocking effect controversy ===
He himself was also subject to some controversy. Maes and colleagues reported fifteen experiments that attempted to replicate the blocking effect. None of them succeeded despite using procedures well-established in previous literature. They argue that publication bias may have produced a false confidence in the robustness of the effect. However, Soto (2018) has questioned this conclusion arguing that they come as a consequence of the type of stimuli used in these studies, and shows how contemporary models of associative learning can predict these results on the basis of this observation.

== Bibliography ==
- The Science and Politics of IQ (1974)
- Hans Jürgen Eysenck and Leon J. Kamin (1981). Intelligence: the Battle for the Mind. MacMillan. ISBN 978-0-330-26399-3.
- Richard Lewontin, Steven Rose and Leon J. Kamin (1984). Not in Our Genes.
