= Robert A. Rescorla =

American psychologist (1940–2020)

- Born: 9 May 1940; Pittsburgh, Pennsylvania, U.S.
- Died: 24 March 2020 (aged 79); Austin, Texas, U.S.
- Education: Swarthmore College (B.A.); University of Pennsylvania (Ph.D.)
- Known for: Rescorla–Wagner model
- Spouse(s): Marged Lindner (divorced); Leslie Rescorla (divorced); Shirley Steele
- Scientific career
- Workplaces: Yale University; University of Pennsylvania
- Thesis: Inhibition of delay in Pavlovian fear conditioning (1966)
- Academic advisors: Henry Gleitman; Solomon Asch

Robert Arthur Rescorla (May 9, 1940 – March 24, 2020) was an American psychologist who specialized in the involvement of cognitive processes in classical conditioning focusing on animal learning and behavior.

One of Rescorla's significant contributions to psychology, with co-creator Allan Wagner, was the Rescorla-Wagner Model of conditioning. This model expanded knowledge on learning processes. Rescorla also continued to develop research on Pavlovian conditioning and instrumental training. Due to his achievements, Rescorla received the American Psychological Association Awards of the Distinguished Scientific Contributions in 1986.

== Early life and education ==
Rescorla was born in Pittsburgh, Pennsylvania, on May 9, 1940. He attended high school in Westfield, New Jersey. Beginning in 1958, he attended Swarthmore College, where he conducted experiments on monkeys with Henry Gleitman and served as Solomon Asch's research assistant, doing human learning experiments. He graduated in 1962 with a B.A. in psychology, with minors in philosophy and math. In 1966, he received his Ph.D. from the University of Pennsylvania, where he worked with Richard Solomon.

== Career ==
Rescorla taught at Yale University from 1966 to 1981. While at Yale, Rescorla began a fruitful collaboration with colleague Allan Wagner, which led to the development of the Rescorla–Wagner model. In 1975, he was elected into the Society of Experimental Psychologists. Rescorla returned to his alma mater in 1981 and was a member of faculty there until 2009. He served as the chair of the psychology department at Penn, as well as the director of undergraduate studies and the dean of the college of arts and sciences.

In 1984, Rescorla was granted a Guggenheim Fellowship. In 1985, he was elected to the National Academy of Sciences and in 1986 was awarded the Distinguished Scientific Contribution award of the American Psychological Association. In 1989, he was named the University of Pennsylvania's James M. Skinner Professor of Science. In 1991, Rescorla was awarded the Howard Crosby Warren Medal by the Society of Experimental Psychologists. He also received the Ira Abrams Distinguished Teaching Award of the School of Arts and Sciences at Penn in 1999, followed by appointment as the Christopher H. Browne Distinguished Professor of Psychology in 2000. In 2005, Rescorla received the Horsley Grantt Award of the Pavlovian Society. Following that, in 2006, he was granted an honorary doctoral degree by the Ghent University, in Belgium. He was elected into the American Academy of Arts and Sciences in 2008.

He found that children will often overextend word meanings, using one word, such as apple, to cover multiple different but similar items, such as oranges. This shows they grasp appearances but not precise labels. Underextension is the opposite, when they have too narrow a meaning. An example of this is using the word shoe to describe only their own shoes and not anyone else's. Rescorla identified three types of overextension: the first is categorical, meaning using a hypernym for a hyponym, such as calling all fruits apple; the second is analogical, which means basing things on similarity, an example being calling a cement mixer a football; and the third is predicate statements, which means labelling objects by their associated context, such as using the word doll to describe an empty cot merely because a doll was usually there.

== Research and contributions ==
=== The Rescorla-Wagner Theory ===
In 1972, Robert A. Rescorla and his colleague Allan R. Wagner at Yale University, published the Rescorla–Wagner model of associative learning. This model conceptualizes learning as the development of associations between conditioned (CS) and unconditioned (US) stimuli, with learning occurring when these stimuli are paired on discrete trials. The change in the association between a CS and an US that occurs when the two are paired depends on how strongly the US is predicted on that trial – that is, informally, how "surprised" the subject is by the US. The amount of this "surprise" depends on the summed associative strength of all cues present during that trial. In contrast, previous models derived the change in associative strength from the current value of the CS alone. The model has been extremely influential, leading to many new experimental findings and theoretical developments.

=== Research program ===
Rescorla conducted research at the University of Pennsylvania on animal learning and behavior, focusing on associative learning and particularly Pavlovian conditioning.

Rescorla's interest in associative learning processes focused on three questions. First, in what situations did associative learning occur? Second, when associative learning occurred, what elements were involved? Third, what principles accounted for the experimental findings? To research these questions, Rescorla and his team used an assortment of methods, including for example fear conditioning, reward training and autoshaping.

== Personal life and death ==
Rescorla was first married to Marged Lindner. In the 1970s, he married Leslie V. Altman, but they later divorced. They had two sons together. He remarried to Shirley Steele.

Rescorla died March 24, 2020, after complications from a fall.

== Publications ==
- Rescorla, R. A. (2006) Deepened Extinction from Compound Stimulus Presentation. Journal of Experimental Psychology: Animal Behavior Processes, 32, 135-144.
- Rescorla, R. A. (2008). Evaluating conditioning of related and unrelated stimuli using a compound test. Learning & Behavior, 36, 67-74.
- Rescorla, R. A. (2008). Conditioning of stimuli with nonzero initial value. Journal of Experimental Psychology: Animal Behavior Processes, 34, 315-323.
