= High-conductance state =

State of neurons

The term high-conductance state describes a particular state of neurons in specific states of the brain, such as for example during wakefulness, attentive states, or even during some anesthetized states. In individual neurons, the high-conductance state is formally defined by the fact that the total synaptic conductance received by the neuron is larger than its natural resting (or leak) conductance, so in a sense the neuron is "driven" by its inputs rather than being dominated by its intrinsic activity. High-conductance states have been well characterized experimentally, but they also have motivated numerous theoretical studies, in particular in relation to the considerable amount of "noise" present in such states. It is believed that this "synaptic noise" has determinant properties on neuronal processing, and even may confer several computational advantages to neurons (see details in the article High-Conductance State in Scholarpedia).

The term high-conductance state is also used to describe specific states of single ion channels. In this case, the high-conductance state corresponds to an open state of the channel which is associated with a particularly high conductance compared to other states.
