= Leslie Rescorla =

US developmental psychologist (1945 - 2020)

- Born: August 15, 1945
- Died: October 12, 2020 (aged 75)
- Spouse(s): Robert Rescorla (divorced); Thomas M. Achenbach
- Awards: Janet L. Hoopes Award

Academic background
- Education: Radcliffe College (BA); London School of Economics (MSc); Yale University (PhD)

Academic work
- Discipline: Psychologist
- Sub-discipline: Developmental psychology
- Institutions: Bryn Mawr College
- Main interests: language development, language delay

Leslie Altman Rescorla (15 August 1945 – 12 October 2020) was a developmental psychologist and expert on language delay in toddlers. Rescorla was Professor of Psychology on the Class of 1897 Professorship of Science and Director of the Child Study Institute at Bryn Mawr College. She was a licensed and school certified psychologist known for her longitudinal research on late talkers. In the 1980s, she created the Language Development Survey, a widely used tool for screening toddlers for possible language delays. Rescorla worked with Thomas M. Achenbach in developing the manual for the Achenbach System of Empirically Based Assessment (ASEBA) used to measure adaptive and maladaptive behavior in children.

Rescorla has published extensively in the field of child language development and co-edited (with Philip Dale) the volume Late Talkers: Language Development, Interventions, and Outcomes. She was awarded the 2018 Janet L. Hoopes Award from the Pennsylvania Branch of the International Dyslexia Association for her research on literacy, reading, and learning disabilities.

== Biography ==
Rescorla received a B.A. degree magna cum laude in Modern European History and Literature at Radcliffe College of Harvard University in 1967. She continued her studies at the London School of Economics, where she earned a M.Sc. in Economic History in 1968. Rescorla later attended graduate school at Yale University, where she obtained a Ph.D in Child Development and Clinical Psychology in 1976. While at Yale, Rescorla conducted research on early vocabulary development with Katherine Nelson. She also collaborated with Edward Zigler on the Yale Child Welfare Research Program, an early intervention study aimed at supporting economically disadvantaged families.

Rescorla was supported by a University of Pennsylvania Research Foundation Grant from 1982 to 1985. She joined the Faculty of Psychology at Bryn Mawr College in 1985, and subsequently served as Chair of the Psychology Department and Director of the School Psychology program. Rescorla's research has been funded by grants from the National Institute of Child Health and Human Development, the National Institute on Deafness and Other Communication Disorders, and the Spencer Foundation.

Rescorla married her research collaborator, Thomas Achenbach, in 2000. Her previous marriage in the 1970s to psychologist Robert Rescorla ended in divorce. They had two sons together.

== Research ==
Rescorla specialized in the epidemiology of language disorders. Her publication summarizing the development and validation of the Language Development Survey, a 10-minute parental report survey for identifying early language delay, was named best paper in 1990 by the editor of the Journal of Speech and Hearing Disorders. Her goal in developing this instrument was to understand the characteristics and consequences of language delay so that educators and other professionals could provide adequate supports. Rescorla took a different approach from previous screening language tools by asking parents to complete a quick and efficient survey, rather than requiring input from a physician or other professional. Rescorla had strong confidence that a parent-report instrument was the best means for acquiring fast, authentic, and valid information about their child's language development. Note that a similar approach was used in developing the MacArthur-Bates Communicative Development Inventories, with research indicating strong correlations in vocabulary scores across the two parent-report instruments.

Rescorla conducted a 15-year longitudinal research study of the development of late speaking toddlers, focusing on their language and literacy skills from ages 2 to 17 years. She found that the late talkers tended to score in the average range on standardized assessments of language and reading by age 5. However, at the ages of 9, 13, and 17 years, the late talkers scored significantly lower on tests of vocabulary, grammar, verbal memory, and reading comprehension when compared to peers who were matched on socioeconomic status and nonverbal ability. The results indicated that language delays in early childhood (24–31 months) were associated with measurable deficits in language-related skills into adolescence.

In collaborative work with Thomas Achenbach, Rescorla has focused on valid assessment of behavioral and emotional problems in children growing up in various countries, using ASEBA scales. In one of their studies, Rescorla and Achenbach administered both the Language Development Survey and the Child Behavior Checklist of the ASEBA to toddlers of ages 18 to 35 months, but did not find any close association between language delay and emotional/behavior problems.

== Representative publications ==
- Rescorla, L (1989). "The Language Development Survey: A screening tool for delayed language in toddlers". Journal of Speech and Hearing Disorders. 54 (4): 587–599. doi:10.1044/jshd.5404.587. PMID 2811339.
- Rescorla, L. (2002). Language and reading outcomes to age 9 in late-talking toddlers. Journal of Speech, Language, and Hearing Research.
- Rescorla, L (2009). "Age 17 language and reading outcomes in late-talking toddlers: Support for a dimensional perspective on language delay". Journal of Speech, Language, and Hearing Research. 52 (1): 16–30. doi:10.1044/1092-4388(2008/07-0171). PMID 18723598.
- Rescorla, L.; Achenbach, T.; Ivanova, M. Y.; Dumenci, L.; Almqvist, F.; Bilenberg, N.; Verhulst, F. (2007). "Behavioral and emotional problems reported by parents of children ages 6 to 16 in 31 societies". Journal of Emotional and Behavioral Disorders. 15 (3): 130–142. doi:10.1177/10634266070150030101. hdl:20.500.11815/3626. S2CID 142993723.
- Rescorla, L. A.; Achenbach, T. M.; Ivanova, M. Y.; Harder, V. S.; Otten, L.; Bilenberg, N.; Dobrean, A. (2011). "International comparisons of behavioral and emotional problems in preschool children: parents' reports from 24 societies". Journal of Clinical Child & Adolescent Psychology. 40 (3): 456–467. doi:10.1080/15374416.2011.563472. PMC 4247339. PMID 21534056.
- Rescorla, L.; Schwartz, E. (1990). "Outcome of toddlers with specific expressive language delay". Applied Psycholinguistics. 11 (4): 393–407. doi:10.1017/s0142716400009644. S2CID 145301606.
