= Inside of a Dog =

2009 book by Alexandra Horowitz

Inside of a Dog: What Dogs See, Smell, and Know is a book written by cognitive scientist, Alexandra Horowitz. Horowitz walks the reader through the cognitive process of dogs in relation to how they perceive their day-to-day activities. The author explains the animal's cognitive abilities, and allows the reader insight into what it might be like to be a dog. The book also contains a brief interview with the author.

Horowitz' approach is based on biosemiotic theory of Jakob von Uexküll on umwelten or the subjective worlds of animals. She writes about revolutionary impact of Uexküll to animal behaviour studies: "anyone who wants to understand the life of an animal must begin by considering what he called their umwelt: their subjective or 'self-world'" (Horowitz 2010, p. 20).

== Author ==
Alexandra Horowitz lives in New York with her husband and son. She has a B.A. in philosophy from the University of Pennsylvania and a Ph.D. in cognitive science from the University of California, San Diego. Before her scientific career, Horowitz worked as a lexicographer at Merrian-Webster and served on the staff of The New Yorker. Horowitz presently teaches psychology at Barnard College, Columbia University. Since Inside of a Dog was published in 2009, she has written four additional books for general readers.

== Honors ==
Inside of a Dog has been extensively reviewed, was Number 1 on the New York Times bestseller list, and remained on the list for 64 weeks. A revised and updated version was published in 2025.
