= The Science and Politics of I.Q. =

1974 book by Leon Kamin

- Cover of the first edition
- Author: Leon Kamin
- Language: English
- Subject: Psychometrics
- Publisher: Lawrence Erlbaum Associates
- Publication date: 1974
- Media type: Print (Hardcover and Paperback)
- Pages: 183
- ISBN: 978-0898591293
- OCLC: 821173384

The Science and Politics of I.Q. is a book by the psychologist Leon Kamin, originally published by Lawrence Erlbaum Associates in 1974. In the book, Kamin examines empirical evidence regarding IQ, a common measure of human intelligence, and concludes that there is no evidence that it is significantly heritable. As part of the book's broader critique of hereditarianism and psychometrics, Kamin also became the first to accuse Cyril Burt of scientific misconduct in his twin research. In the book, Kamin states one of its principal conclusions thus: "There exist no data which should lead a prudent man to accept the hypothesis that IQ test scores are in any degree heritable."

== Reviews ==
The psychologist Asa Grant Hilliard III reviewed the book favorably, describing it as "thoughtful and meticulously documented" and as "a book of profound importance for the contemporary social and professional scene." In another favorable review, Raymond Lorion concluded that the book was "...a unique and important contribution to timely consideration of the nature-nurture issue." Peter Medawar wrote in the New York Review of Books that "...Kamin's interpretation of the origins of hereditarian theory has about it the kind of Olympian glibness more often found in psychoanalytic theory, and it is equally difficult to refute." Medawar also praised Kamin for "...his nice touch for allowing the subjects of his criticism to assassinate themselves." David Layzer reviewed the book favorably in Scientific American, writing that "Kamin has made a strong negative case. He has gone back to the primary sources and demonstrated with a wealth of circumstantial detail that the data they contain cannot support the interpretation that Burt, Jensen and other hereditarians have placed on them."

Other reviews of the book were more mixed. The psychologist Nicholas Mackintosh wrote that "Whatever reservations one may have about the validity of his many arguments...Kamin has performed a notable service by subjecting the evidence on the heritability of intelligence to searching and critical analysis." Economist John Conlisk commended the book for discussing a "broad range of issues" and for paying close attention to the original data, while also criticizing it for its environmentalist bias. Similarly, behavior geneticist David W. Fulker commended the book for cataloging examples of misrepresentation of IQ test scores, while also criticizing its description of research into the heritability of IQ. Writing in Social Research, psychologist Franz Samelson stated that while he agreed with the book's conclusion regarding the flaws of research on the supposed genetic basis of IQ, he found Kamin's "historical account" of IQ testing presented in the book to be "grossly oversimplified". Douglas N. Jackson criticized the book's portrayal of the developers of IQ tests, which he claimed was unfairly negative: "...the author's collection of historical quotations by no means represents a random sample of the views of psychologists of the past or of today...It does not follow that because some historical advocates of the heritability of IQ have espoused illiberal views and policies all have such views."
