= Blocking effect =

Elaboration on classical conditioning in psychology

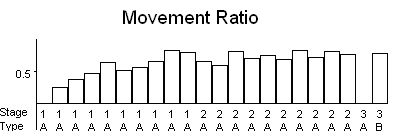
Note the movement ratio at trial stage 3A

Blocking effect for mice. Left: pairings of light (CS1) and food (US) causes salivation (CR). Unshown: after training, CS1 alone causes CR. Mid: pairing of CS1, tone (CS2), and US causes CR. Right: CS2 alone doesn't trigger CR.

In Kamin's blocking effect the conditioning of an association between two stimuli, a conditioned stimulus (CS) and an unconditioned stimulus (US) is impaired if, during the conditioning process, the CS is presented together with a second CS that has already been associated with the unconditioned stimulus.

For example, an agent (such as a mouse in the figure) is exposed to a light (the first conditioned stimulus, CS1), together with food (the unconditioned stimulus, US). After repeated pairings of CS1 and US, the agent salivates when the light comes on (conditioned response, CR). Then, there are more conditioning trials, this time with the light (CS1) and a tone (CS2) together with the US. Now, when tested, the agent does not salivate to the tone (CS2). In other words, an association between the tone CS2 and the US has been "blocked" because the CS1–US association already exists.

This effect was most famously explained by the Rescorla–Wagner model. The model says, essentially, that if one CS (here the light) already fully predicts that the US will come, nothing will be learned about a second CS (here the tone) that accompanies the first CS. Blocking is an outcome of other models that also base learning on the difference between what is predicted and what actually happens.

== Comparator ==
While some argue that blocking demonstrates that the organism did not learn the association between the CS2 and the US, this is not necessarily the case. For instance, after a traditional blocking paradigm, the CS2 does not elicit a response (alone). However, if the response to the CS1 is extinguished, the organism will begin to respond to CS2 alone. This demonstrates that the association between the CS2 and the US was initially learned but in comparison to the stronger predictive value of the CS1 there is no conditioned response. However, after extinction, the CS2 does have more predictive value than the now extinguished CS1. However, this finding was not replicated in a later, similar study.

== Backward blocking ==
The reverse of blocking is often called backward blocking. In backward blocking, the subject is exposed to the compound stimulus (CS1 and CS2 together) first, and only later to CS1 alone. In some human and animal studies, subjects show a reduction in the association between CS2 and the US, though the effect is often weaker than the standard blocking effect, and vanishes under some conditions. This effect is not predicted by the Rescorla–Wagner model although other models have been proposed that capture this effect.

== Robustness of the effect ==
Maes and colleagues reported fifteen experiments that attempted to replicate the blocking effect. None of them succeeded despite using procedures well-established in previous literature. They argue that publication bias may have produced a false confidence in the robustness of the effect. However, Soto (2018) has questioned this conclusion arguing that they come as a consequence of the type of stimuli used in these studies, and shows how contemporary models of associative learning can predict these results on the basis of this observation.

== See also ==
- Classical conditioning
- Rescorla–Wagner model
