= Solomon four-group design =

Research method developed by Richard Solomon

The Solomon four-group design is a research method developed by Richard Solomon in 1949. It is sometimes used in social science, psychology and medicine. It can be used if there are concerns that the treatment might be sensitized by the pre-test. In addition of the usual two groups (treatment and control), it has a second pair of groups who do not receive a pre-intervention evaluation.

== Structure ==
The structure of the trial is shown in the table :

The four groups in the Solomon design
Group	Pre-intervention	Intervention	Post-intervention
1	Test	Treatment	Test
2	Test	Control	Test
3	No test	Treatment	Test
4	No test	Control	Test

The first two groups receive the evaluation test before and after the study, as in a normal two-group trial. The second groups receive the evaluation only after the study.

The effectiveness of the treatment can be evaluated by comparisons between groups 1 and 3 and between groups 2 and 4. In addition, the effect of the pre-treatment evaluation can be calculated by comparing the control group who received the pre-treatment evaluation with those who did not (groups 2 and 4).

Various statistical treatments for the Solomon four-group design have been put forward, including Stouffer's Z and Monte Carlo.
