= Allan R. Wagner =

American psychologist (1934–2018)

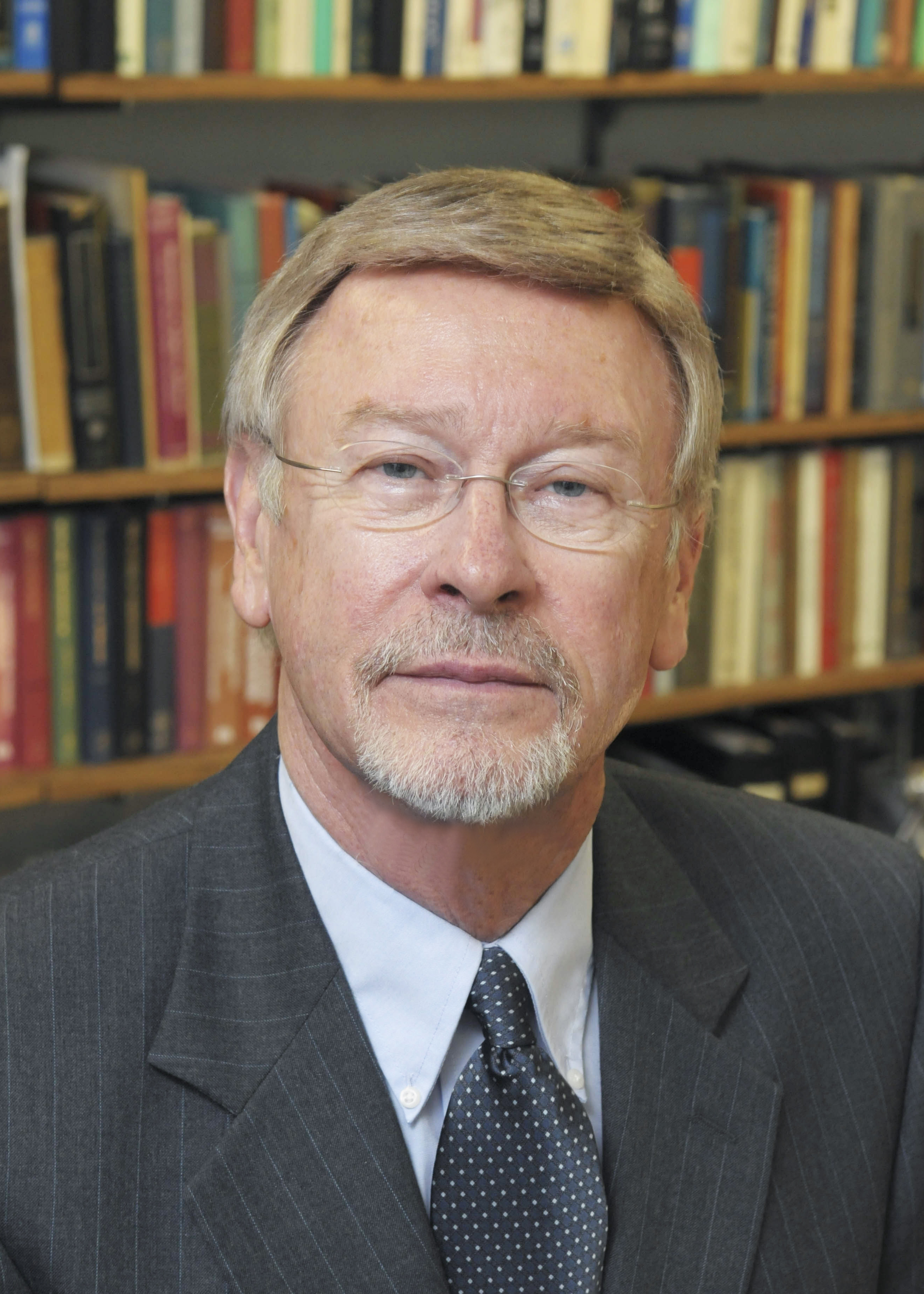
- Born: January 6, 1934; Springfield, Illinois, U.S.
- Died: September 28, 2018 (aged 84); North Haven, Connecticut, U.S.
- Education: University of Iowa
- Known for: Rescorla–Wagner model
- Scientific career
- Workplaces: Yale University
- Thesis: Acquisition and extinction of an instrumental response as a function of percentage reinforcement, magnitude of reward, and number of acquisition trials (1959)
- Doctoral advisor: Kenneth W. Spence

Allan Ray Wagner (6 January 1934 – 28 September 2018) was an American experimental psychologist and learning theorist, whose work focused upon the basic determinants of associative learning and habituation. He co-authored the influential Rescorla–Wagner model of Pavlovian conditioning (1972) as well as the Standard Operating Procedures or "Sometimes Opponent Process" (SOP) theory of associative learning (1981), the Affective Extension of SOP (AESOP, 1989) and the Replaced Elements Model (REM) of configural representation (2001, 2008). His research involved extensive study of the conditioned eyeblink response of the rabbit, of which he was one of the initial investigators (1964).

Wagner received his Ph.D. from the University of Iowa in 1959, under Kenneth W. Spence, and he was on the faculty of Yale University until his death, serving as Chair of the Department of Psychology from 1983 to 1989, Chair of the Department of Philosophy from 1991 to 1993, Director of the Division of the Social Sciences from 1992 to 1998, and in his last years the James Rowland Angell Professor Emeritus of Psychology.

Wagner's scientific contributions were recognized by his receipt of the Howard Crosby Warren Medal of the Society of Experimental Psychologists (1991), the Distinguished Scientific Contribution Award of the American Psychological Association (1999), the W. Horsley Gantt Medal of the Pavlovian Society (2009), the William James Lifetime Achievement Award of the Association for Psychological Science (2013), and election to membership in the National Academy of Sciences (1999).

== Scientific societies, offices, and honors ==
- AAAS: Fellow (1971), Electorate Nominating Committee (1985–88), Council Delegate (1988–91)
- Eastern Psychological Association: Board of Directors (1985–1988)
- Society for Quantitative Analysis of Behavior: Secretary (1983–92)
- Society of Experimental Psychologists: Fellow (1972), Howard Crosby Warren Medalist (1991)
- American Psychological Assoc.: Fellow (1968); Distinguished Scientific Contribution Award (1999)
- National Academy of Sciences: Member (1992)
- Society for Computational Models of Associative Learning:Founding Member, Contribution Award (2009)
- The Pavlovian Society: W. Horsley Gantt Medalist (2009)
- Association for Psychological Science: Fellow (1988); William James Lifetime Achievement Award (2013)

== Selected publications ==
- Logan, F.A., & Wagner, A.R. (1965). Reward and punishment. Boston: Allyn and Bacon.
- Wagner, A.R., Logan, F.A., Haberlandt, K., & Price, T. (1968). Stimulus selection in animal discrimination learning. Journal of Experimental Psychology, 76, 171-180.
- Wagner, A.R. (1969). Frustrative nonreward: A variety of punishment. In B.A. Campbell & R.M. Church (eds.), Punishment and aversive behavior (pp. 157– 181). New York: Appleton-Century-Crofts.
- Wagner, A.R. (1969). Stimulus selection and a "modified continuity theory." In G.H. Bower & J.T. Spence (Eds.), The psychology of learning and motivation Vol. 3 (pp. 1–41). New York: Academic Press.
- Wagner, A.R., & Rescorla, R.A. (1972). Inhibition in Pavlovian conditioning: Application of a theory. In R.A. Boakes & M.S. Halliday (Eds.), Inhibition and learning (pp. 301–336). London: Academic Press.
- Rescorla, R.A., & Wagner, A.R. (1972). A theory of Pavlovian conditioning: Variations in the effectiveness of reinforcement and nonreinforcement. In A.H. Black & W.F. Prokasy (Eds.), Classical conditioning II: Current theory and research (pp. 64–99). New York: Appleton-Century-Crofts.
- Wagner, A.R. (1978). Expectancies and the priming of STM. In S.H. Hulse, H. Fowler, & W.K. Honig (Eds.), Cognitive processes in animal behavior (pp. 177–209). Hillsdale, NJ: Erlbaum.
- Wagner, A.R. (1981). SOP: A model of automatic memory processing in animal behavior. In N.E. Spear & R.R. Miller (Eds.), Information processing in animals: Memory mechanisms (pp. 5–47). Hillsdale, NJ: Erlbaum.
- Wagner, A.R., & Brandon, S.E. (1989). Evolution of a structured connectionist model of Pavlovian conditioning (ÆSOP). In S.B. Klein and R.R. Mowrer (Eds.), Contemporary learning theories: Pavlovian conditioning and the status of traditional learning theories. (pp. 149–189). Hillsdale, NJ: Erlbaum.
- Wagner, A. R., & Donegan, N. (1989). Some relationships between a computational model (SOP) and an essential neural circuit for Pavlovian (rabbit eyeblink) conditioning. In R. D. Hawkins and G. H. Bower (Eds.), Computational models of learning in simple neural systems: The psychology of learning and motivation, Vol. 23. (pp. 157–203). New York: Academic Press.
- Wagner, A.R., & Brandon, S.E., (2001) A componential theory of Pavlovian Conditioning. In R.R. Mowrer and S.B. Klien (Eds.) Handbook of Contemporary Learning Theories (pp. 23–64) Mahwah, NJ. Erlbaum.
- Wagner, A.R. (2008). Evolution of an elemental theory of Pavlovian conditioning. Learning and Behavior. 36, 253-265.
- Wagner, A.R., & Vogel, E. H. (2010) Associative modulation of US processing: Implications for understanding of habituation. In N. Schmajuk (Ed.) Computational models of associative learning. pp. 150–185, Cambridge: Cambridge University Press.
- Vogel, E.H., Ponce, F.P., & Wagner, A.R. (2017). A theoretical analysis of transfer of occasion setting: SOP with Replaced Elements. Behavioural Processes, 137, 19-32.
- Vogel, E.H., Ponce, F.P., & Wagner, A.R. (2018). The development and present status of the SOP model of associative learning. Quarterly Journal of Experimental Psychology.
