= Association value =

Measure of meaningfulness in cognition

Association value is a concept in cognitive psychology and in particular the psychology of human learning and memory. The association value of a stimulus is a measure of its meaningfulness. It is a strong predictor of how easy it is to learn new information about that stimulus, for example to learn to associate it with a second stimulus, or to recall or recognize it in a memory test.

The concept of association value is needed because formally similar stimuli are frequently learned at very different rates and remembered with very different accuracies. Glaze developed the concept of association value to explain differences in the rate of learning of nonsense syllables, which had been introduced into psychology by Hermann Ebbinghaus to provide a standard stimulus in studies of human learning and memory, but had rapidly been discovered to have highly variable properties. Glaze asked students to say whether stimuli (nonsense syllables in his experiment) had meaning for them; the proportion who said "yes" for a given nonsense syllable gave him a measure of its association value. A more precise measure was introduced by Noble, who measured association value (to which he gave the everyday name, "meaning") by the number of associated words that a person could write down in 60 seconds. Building on earlier experiments by, for example, Lyon, Noble showed that association value of nonsense syllables, measured in this way, was strongly linked to the speed with which people could learn to reproduce a list of them.

The idea was subsequently applied to other tasks and other kinds of stimuli, such as numbers and abstract shapes. The general relationship is consistent in all cases: material of higher association value is learned more quickly.

Clearly the concept could be little more than a label for unexplained variation in learning rates. It is given content by the facts that:

- The association value of stimuli can be measured independently of experiments on learning and memory, for example through the methods used by Glaze and Noble.
- Association values differ systematically between types of stimuli. For example, nonsense syllables that approximately obey the rules of English spelling have higher associative value for English speakers than those that do not.
- The same association values predict differences between stimuli on a wide range of tasks, from visual search through short-term memory to the context in which the concept was originally introduced, paired-associate learning involving long-term memory.
- Although associations to individual stimuli inevitably vary between individuals, associative values determined at group level, or by the determination of psychometric norms in previous studies, successfully predict variations in, for example, learning rates.

Although the idea of association value seems intuitive, further reflection shows that the underlying principle is not logically inevitable. The fact that stimuli that have high association values are easily learned and remembered means that it is easier to learn new meanings for stimuli that already have multiple meanings; the opposite could have been the case – it could have turned out that it would be hard to learn anything new about a stimulus that was already loaded with associations.

Differences in association value account for many familiar facts of everyday cognition. For example, it is easier for an English speaker to remember names in English or other European languages, where the names are associated with everyday meanings (e.g. "Brown") and with numerous known people who have that name, than it is for them to remember names in Chinese, where no such associations are known; and the same applies in reverse to a Chinese speaker. This is why Chinese people living in English-speaking countries commonly take English names, and vice versa. Similarly, it is much easier to remember places, objects, or rooms in a building by name than by number, because names have higher association values than numbers.

Some formal theories of learning incorporate a quantified form of the concept of association value. For example, in the Rescorla–Wagner model of classical conditioning, the parameter β, which expresses the capacity of the unconditional stimulus to support learning, is sometimes referred to as its association value. This usage is consistent with the more general concept of association value as described by Glaze, but typically in such formal theories the parameters are not measured independently of the fitting of the model to learning data.
