= Wakefulness =

Brain state and state of consciousness

Wakefulness is a daily recurring brain state in which an individual is conscious and engages in coherent cognitive and behavioural responses to the external world.

Being awake is the opposite of being asleep, in which most external inputs to the brain are excluded from neural processing.

== Wakefulness research ==
Wakefulness is characterized by the capacity of an animal to respond to its environment. Research on wakefulness focuses on the physiological and neural activity that allow an animal to transition from sleep to wake as well as remain wakeful. Because wakefulness is defined by the absence of sleep, the biology of wakefulness tends to be studied in constrast to the biology of sleep. For this reason, researchers of wakefulness tend to be identified as, or aligned with, sleep researchers. Other terms used to describe wakefulness researchers include chronobiology and circadian research.

A major development in sleep and wake research in the 20th century was the quantification of wakefulness and sleep stages. Following the development of the polysomnogram, sleep and wake states have been quantitatively defined by their characteristic brain activity, eye movement, and muscle tone. In wakefulness, brain activity is high-frequency and low-voltage (i.e., unsynchronized), eye movement is voluntary, and muscle tone is variable.

== Brain areas involved in wakefulness ==
Early research in wakefulness primarily investigated the effects of brain lesions (damage) on sleep and wakefulness. This research established multiple brain areas as being critical for wakefulness, most prominently upper brain stem areas such as the locus coeruleus, raphe nucleus, and midbrain. Damage to these areas was found to cause coma, and therefore be necessary for wakefulness. These areas of the brain stem are often––and somewhat contentiously––referred to as the reticular activating system or ascending arousal system. During this time, it was established that wakefulness is produced by a complex interaction between multiple neuromodulatory systems arising in the brainstem and ascending through the midbrain, hypothalamus, thalamus and basal forebrain. Further investigations demonstrated the role of neuromodulators such as norepinephrine, serotonin, and acetylcholine arising from the brain stem as being necessary for wakefulness. However, research focus in the 21st century has expanded this model of wakefulness to include brain areas outside the brain stem as well as a wider variety of neurotransmitters and neuromodulators.

Since the 2010s, advancements in molecular and genetic manipulations have allowed researchers to determine the specific neural circuit activity that underlies wakefulness. Broadly, areas of the brain stem and midbrain are able to generate and maintain wakefulness through the coordination of neurotransmitters and neuromodulators that ultimately cause changes in cortical activity to produce wakefulness.

== Brain stem ==
Monoamines from the brain stem, including norepinephrine, serotonin, dopamine, and histamine, project to areas of the forebrain and cortex extensively. These neurons are generally most active during wakefulness.

=== Locus coeruleus ===
Neurons releasing norepinephrine in the locus coeruleus have been demonstrated to be critical in maintaining wakefulness. Classically, this neuromodulator is thought to underlie vigilance state, also known as arousal or alertness. The conclusion that norepinephrine is necessary for wakefulness is supported by the fact that norepinephrine is correlated with wakefulness, as well as evidence that this neuromodulator is involved in sensory-evoked arousals from sleep and movement during wakefulness through projections to spinal cord motor neurons.

Activity from the locus coeruleus is highest with stress, novel stimuli, or salient stimuli. However, some studies have demonstrated that this activity is not necessary for wakefulness. This has led some researchers to conclude that norepinephrine from the locus coeruleus may be necessary for critical behaviors in wakefulness (such as alertness and responsiveness), but not wakefulness itself. Because voluntary behavior is a fundamental feature of healthy wakefulness, determining the necessity of norepinephrine in either wakefulness or wake-related behavior is a matter of clinical importance.

=== Parabrachial nucleus ===
The parabrachial nucleus integrates sensory and autonomic information with cortical arousal to mediate physiological needs. It is crucial for relaying sensory signals to the forebrain. Lesions of glutamatergic neurons in this region cause a permanent comatose state. Glutamatergic neurons in this area project to the lateral hypothalamus, basal forebrain, and cerebral cortex. These neurons are primarily wake- and REM sleep-active.

=== Dorsal raphe nucleus ===
Serotonergic neurons in this area promote wakefulness. These neurons have both forward and feedback synaptic connections with brain areas involved in sleep and wakefulness states. The raphe nucleus innervates the amygdala, insula, and prefrontal cortex, which allows it to mediate emotional processing and motivation. Early lesion studies suggested that serotonin from this region was necessary for sleep. However, by the mid-2010s, it was established that these neurons are essential for thermogenesis, and sleep disruption from serotonin depletion was a consequence of hypothermia. In contrast, some evidence demonstrates that raphe nuclei serotonin promotes wakefulness. In line with this, drugs that increase serotonin, such as SSRIs, tend to increase wakefulness.

Dopaminergic neurons in this area are wake-active and wake-promoting. Damaging these neurons reduces arousal and increases total sleep time. GABAergic neurons in this region also promote wakefulness.

=== Ventral tegmental area ===
Dopaminergic, glutamatergic, and GABAergic neurons in this area are most active in wakefulness and REM sleep.

The ventral tegmental area contains many dopaminergic neurons. These neurons are heavily implicated in reward. Dopamine release from this brain area facilitates attention toward salient stimuli, or something rewarding or adversive. Because neurons in this brain area do not increase their firing rates with wakefulness, some researchers concluded that this area is not involved in sleep and wakefulness. However, chemogenetic inhibition of dopamine-releasing neurons in this region reduces wakefulness, especially under conditions of high motivation. Furthermore, the activity of these neurons changes neuronal excitability and promotes wakefulness. It has been demonstrated that stimulants, such as amphetamine and nicotine, promote wakefulness by blocking dopamine re-uptake in this region.

== Forebrain ==
=== Basal forebrain ===
The basal forebrain contains cholinergic, glutamatergic, and GABAergic neurons. These neurons innervate the cortex and promote wakefulness through enhancing cortical activation. Stimulation of this region promotes arousal. Lesions of the basal forebrain can produce coma.

Overall, neuronal activity in the basal forebrain promotes wakefulness. Most basal forebrain neurons are maximally active during both wakefulness and REM sleep. Cholinergic neurons fire with fast cortical rhythms during wakefulness and REM sleep. During wakefulness, this activity is necessary for attention, memory, sensory processing, and cortical plasticity. Selective manipulations of cholinergic basal forebrain neurons have demonstrated that these neurons are necessary for fast cortical activity, but perhaps not for wakefulness itself. By contrast, GABAergic neurons in this area are sufficient to induce wakefulness through inhibiting cortical interneurons. Limited evidence suggests that glutamatergic basal forebrain neurons promote wakefulness through synaptic connections with the cortex and arousal-promoting subcortical regions.

=== Hypothalamus ===
Historically, the role of histamine and orexin (also known as hypocretin) in the hypothalamus has been investigated in its role in sleep and wakefulness. These neurons were found to be active with arousal and locomotion. These neurons project to locus coeruleus noradrenergic neurons and ventral tegmental dopaminergic neurons to promote wakefulness.

Neurons producing histamine and orexin in this brain area have not been conclusively shown to be necessary for wakefulness. Damaging these neurons has little lasting effect on the amount or timing of wake and sleep. Since the 21st century, it has been established that these neuromodulators are important for supporting wakefulness in sub-optimal conditions. However, damaging orexinergic neurons in the lateral hypothalamus causes narcolepsy. This condition is defined by normal amounts of time spent in sleeping and waking states, but unstable transitions between these states. Overall, neurons in the lateral hypothalamus, most notably orexin-producing neurons but also glutamatergic and GABAergic neurons, promote wakefulness. These neurons have many connections to the brainstem, basal forebrain, and midbrain, many of which promote wakefulness. Lesions to the posterior lateral hypothalamus cause sleepiness, which may be accounted for by glutamatergic neurons that activate the cortex and GABAergic neurons that inhibit sleep-promoting circuits. GABAergic neurons in the lateral hypothalamus promote wakefulness from NREM sleep specifically.

=== Thalamus ===
The thalamus influences cortical oscillations during wakefulness and sleep. The critical and intertwined role of the thalamus in cortical oscillations, in both wake and sleep, has led to frequent discussion of thalamocortical oscillations and circuitry in neuroscientific research.

Lesions to the thalamus impair consciousness, but have little effect on wake-sleep states. Because lesion studies formed the foundation of sleep research in the 20th century, this conclusion delayed research into the role of the thalamus in wakefulness until the 21st century. In wakefulness, thalamocortical neurons receive excitatory input from wake-promoting neurons, including norepinephrine-producing neurons from the locus coeruleus and orexin-producing neurons from the lateral hypothalamus. These neurons have been demonstrated to be sufficient for wakefulness. Classically, the thalamus is considered to be the relay station of the brain––that is, it "relays" many inputs from the peripheral nervous system and lower brain areas to higher cortical areas. Since the early 2010s, research on the thalamus has emphasized its active role in processing information. Because it receives inputs from downstream sensory information, brain stem neuronal activity, and forebrain activity, as well as feedback connections from upstream cortical areas, it is positioned to act as an active interchange of processed information, rather than a passive relay of information. Because this brain area receives many inputs from lower brain areas that are required for wakefulness, and sends many inputs to neocortical areas that define wakefulness, the role of this brain area in wakefulness is an active area of research.

== Glial cells in wakefulness ==
An effect of wakefulness is the reduction of glycogen held in the astrocytes, which supply energy to the neurons. Studies have shown that one of sleep's underlying functions is to replenish this glycogen energy source.

While neuronal synaptic transmission reaches its lowest level of synchronization with wakefulness, astrocytic calcium signaling synchronizes with wakefulness. This signaling is correlated with locus coeruleus-dependent arousal.

== See also ==
- Dream argument
- Eugeroic
- High-conductance state
- Lucid dream
- Sleepwalking
- Mindfulness
