= Paroxysmal finger hematoma =

Spontaneous internal bleeding within the hand

- Other names: Achenbach's syndrome, paroxysmal hand hematoma, painful blue finger
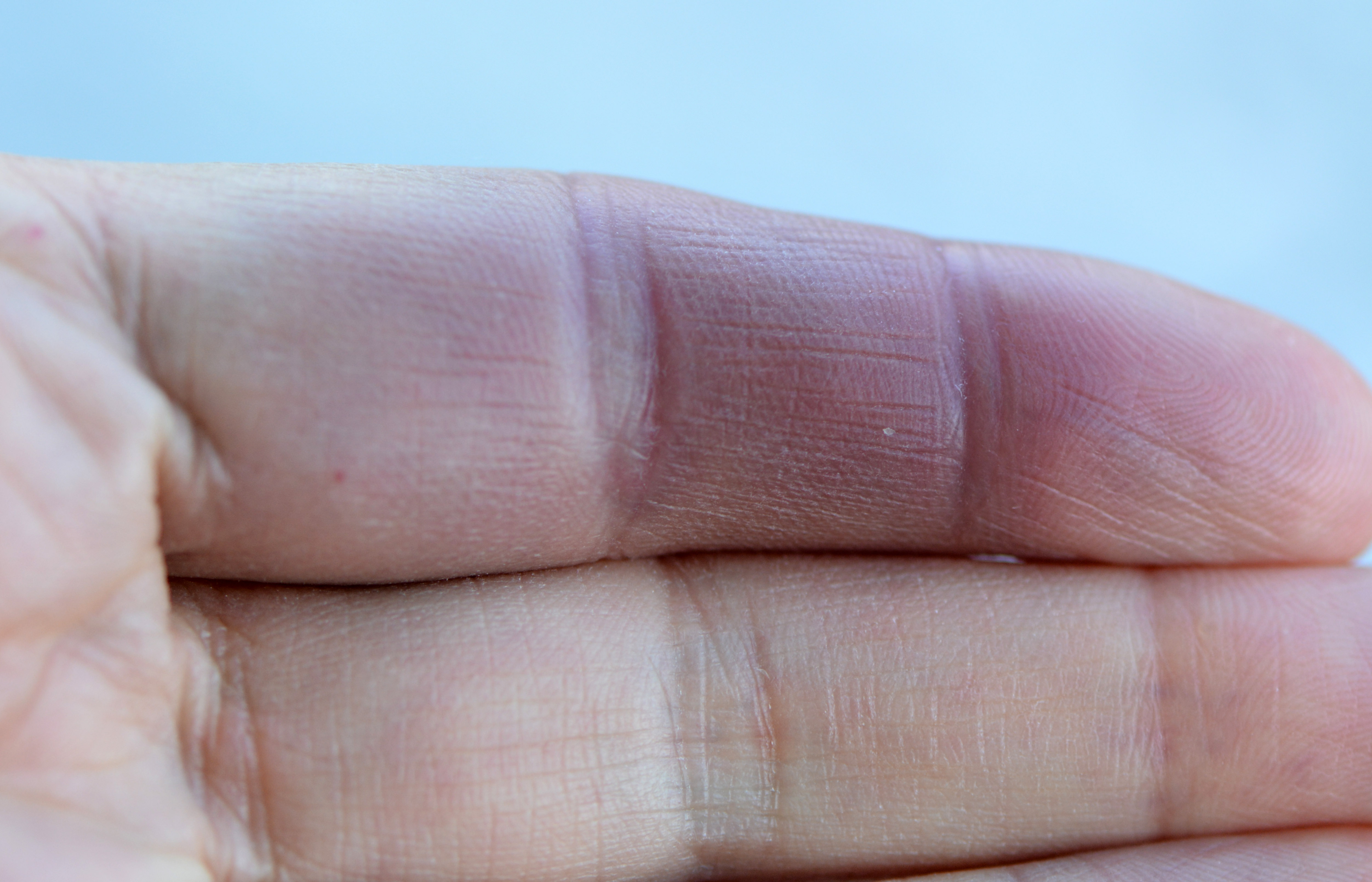
- Paroxysmal finger hematoma appears often on the internal surface of the finger, under the middle finger or forefinger, at the joints of the first or second phalanx.
- Specialty: Vascular medicine
- Symptoms: Pain, swelling, discoloration, itchiness
- Risk factors: Female sex; age over 40
- Diagnostic method: By exclusion
- Differential diagnosis: Acute limb ischemia, Raynaud syndrome, thromboangiitis obliterans (Buerger disease), acrocyanosis, painful bruising syndrome (Gardner-Diamond syndrome), acrorygosis, chilblains, deep vein thrombosis (DVT) of the finger
- Treatment: Over-the-counter analgesia

Paroxysmal finger hematoma (PFH), also known as paroxysmal hand hematoma, painful blue finger, or Achenbach's syndrome, is an uncommon vascular condition characterized by pain, bluish discoloration, and swelling in a portion of the finger. The cause of paroxysmal finger hematoma is unknown. PFH is often confused with other, more serious illnesses and is diagnosed by ruling out those conditions. PFH is considered benign and non-urgent because it resolves on its own without intervention over an average of four days.

== Causes ==
It is not known what causes PFH. Many patients report no injury to the finger before symptoms start, and no genetic, environmental, or lifestyle link has been established. Women are diagnosed with PFH more often than men, and most people who seek treatment for PFH are over the age of 40.

== Signs and symptoms ==
PFH has a sudden onset of 24-48 hours. Apart from pain, swelling, and discoloration, a tingling sensation may also be present in the affected finger. The discoloration can appear bluish, mimicking cyanosis despite adequate oxygenation of the digit.

== Diagnosis ==
PFH is diagnosed after ruling out all other possible diagnoses. These differential diagnoses include:

- Acute limb ischemia
- Raynaud syndrome
- Thromboangiitis obliterans (Buerger disease)
- Acrocyanosis
- Painful bruising syndrome (Gardner-Diamond syndrome)
- Acrorygosis
- Chilblains

Unlike in the above conditions, PFH presents with:

- Normal temperatures and pulse strengths of the affected finger.
- Normal findings of vascular imaging studies like Doppler ultrasonography, CT angiography, and echocardiogram.
- Normal results of blood cell testing, coagulation studies, and immunological assays.

Finally, the location of PFH distinguishes it from other diseases:

- PFH is usually limited to the first or second segments of the second or third fingers.
- Symptoms of PFH do not affect the fingertip.
- PFH appears most often on the volar (internal) aspect of the hand.

== Treatment ==
PFH resolves on its own, so treatment is focused on managing pain with mild, over-the-counter painkillers until symptoms resolve after 2-14 days.

== See also ==
- List of cutaneous conditions
- Hematoma
- Phalanx bone
