= Association for the Scientific Study of Consciousness =

American nonprofit organization

- Abbreviation: ASSC
- Types: open-access publisher
- Legal status: 501(c)(3) organization

The Association for the Scientific Study of Consciousness (ASSC) is an American nonprofit organization for professional membership that aims to encourage research on consciousness in cognitive science, neuroscience, philosophy, and other relevant disciplines. The association aims to advance research about the nature, function, and underlying mechanisms of consciousness.

== History ==
The organization was created in 1994 in Berkeley. The original aim of the organization was to act as a framework by which the international academic community could generate meetings devoted to the academic study of consciousness. The original founding members included Bernard Baars, William Banks, George Buckner, David Chalmers, Stanley Klein, Bruce Mangan, Thomas Metzinger, David Rosenthal, and Patrick Wilken. Since 1994, the organization has put on eleven meetings and assumed many other activities, including an e-print archive and an online journal Psyche. However, the Psyche journal is no longer active.

== Activities ==
Since 1997, the ASSC has organized annual conferences to promote interaction and spread knowledge of scientific and philosophical advances in the field of consciousness research.

In addition to organizing annual meetings, the association promotes the academic study of consciousness in a number of other ways:

- The official journal of the society is the open-access journal Neuroscience of Consciousness.
- The association published the open-access journal Psyche until 2010.
- The association provides a freely available e-print archive of papers relevant to the study of consciousness.
- The society also publishes occasional edited books on selected topics. To date three books have been published:
  - Thomas Metzinger, ed. (2000). The Neural Correlates of Consciousness: Empirical and Conceptual Questions. MIT Press. ISBN 0-262-13370-9.
  - Axel Cleeremans, ed. (2003). The Unity of Consciousness: Binding, Integration, and Dissociation. Oxford University Press. ISBN 0-19-850857-3.
  - Steven Laureys, ed. (2005). Progress in Brain Research, The boundaries of consciousness: neurobiology and neuropathology. Elsevier. ISBN 0-444-51851-7.
- The society awards the annual William James Prize for an outstanding published contribution to the empirical or philosophical study of consciousness by a graduate student or postdoctoral scholar within five years of receiving a PhD or other advanced degree.

== See also ==
- The Science of Consciousness
