= Child Behavior Checklist =

Method of identifying problem behavior in children

The Child Behavior Checklist (CBCL) is a widely used caregiver report form identifying problem behavior in children. It is widely used in both research and clinical practice with youths. It has been translated into more than 90 languages, and normative data are available integrating information from multiple societies. Because a core set of the items have been included in every version of the CBCL since the 1980s, it provides a meter stick for measuring whether amounts of behavior problems have changed over time or across societies. This is a helpful complement to other approaches for looking at rates of mental-health issues, as the definitions of disorders have changed repeatedly over the same time frame.

It is a component in the Achenbach System of Empirically Based Assessment developed by Thomas M. Achenbach.

== Versions and nature of test ==
Across versions, the first pages of the CBCL record demographic information and ratings of positive behaviors, academic functioning (school aged version only), and social competence. The last two pages list common behavior problems, each listed as a brief statement about the child's behavior, e.g., Acts too young for his/her age. Responses are recorded on a Likert scale: 0 = Not True, 1 = Somewhat or Sometimes True, 2 = Very True or Often True. The Child Behavior Checklist exists in two different versions, depending on the age of the child being referred to.

=== Pre-school ===
For the preschool version of the CBCL (CBCL/1½-5), parents or others who interact with the child in regular contexts rate the child's behavior. Respondents rate the child's behavior on a 3-point scale (not true, somewhat or sometimes true, and very true or often true), and are instructed to rate the behavior as it occurs now or within the previous two months. This delineation differs from the instructions on other age-versions, due to the fact that rapid development and behavioral changes in the preschool age range are common. The preschool checklist contains 100 problem behavior questions.

=== School-age ===
Like on the preschool version, the school-age version of the CBCL (CBCL/6-18) instructs a respondent who knows the child well (usually a parent or other close caregiver) to report on the child's problems. Alternative measures are available for teachers (the Teacher's Report Form) and the child (the Youth Self Report, for youths age 11 to 18 years). The school-age checklist contains 118 problem behavior questions.

== Scoring ==
The main scoring for the CBCL is based on statistical groupings of sets of behaviors that typically occur together. The original scale used principal components analysis to group the items, and more recent research has used confirmatory factor analysis to test the structure. Similar questions are grouped into a number of syndrome scale scores, and their scores are summed to produce a raw score for that syndrome.

The eight empirically based "narrowband" syndrome scales are:

1. Aggressive Behavior
2. Anxious/Depressed
3. Attention Problems
4. Rule-Breaking Behavior
5. Somatic Complaints
6. Social Problems
7. Thought Problems
8. Withdrawn/Depressed.

There are two "broadband" scales that combine several of the syndrome scales: Internalizing problems sums the Anxious/depressed, Withdrawn-depressed, and Somatic complaints scores; Externalizing problems combines Rule-breaking and Aggressive behavior. There also is a Total problems score, which is the sum of the scores of all the problem items.

After 2001, the CBCL also included a set of "DSM-oriented" scales, made of items that a panel of experts picked as matching parts of the diagnostic criteria for DSM-IV disorders. The CBCL also has a few items that only contribute to the Total score, which were considered clinically important even though too rare to lump into the syndrome scales.

The CBCL also uses a normative sample to create standard scores. These compare the raw score to what would be typical compared to responses for youths of the same gender and similar age (the school-aged version splits the age groups into 6–10 years and 11–18 years). The standard scores are scaled so that 50 is average for the youth's age and gender, with a standard deviation of 10 points. Higher scores indicate greater problems. For each syndrome, Internalizing and Externalizing problem scales, and the total score, scores can be interpreted as falling in the normal, borderline, or clinical behavior. Any score that falls below the 93rd percentile is considered normal, scores between the 93–97th percentile are borderline clinical, and any score above the 97th percentile are in the clinical range.

Norms take into account both age and gender; there are separate norms for girls and boys, and separate norms for ages 6–11 and ages 12–18.

== Psychometric properties ==
=== Reliability ===
Reliability refers to whether the scores are reproducible. Unless otherwise specified, the reliability scores and values come from studies done with a United States population sample.

Rubric for evaluating norms and reliability for the General Behavior Inventory (Note: Table from Youngstrom et al., extending Hunsley & Mash, 2008)
Criterion	Rating (adequate, good, excellent, too good (Note: Indicates new construct or category))	Explanation with references
Norms	Excellent	National probability samples used to establish norms.
Internal Consistency (Cronbach's alpha)	Ranges from Good to Excellent (depending on scale)	Empirically Based Scales: Anxious/Depressed = .84; Withdrawn/Depressed = .80; Somatic Complaints = .78; Social Problems = .82; Thought Problems = .78; Attention Problems = .86; Rule-Breaking Behavior = .85; Aggressive Behavior = .94; Internalizing Broad Band Score = .90; Externalizing Broad Band Score =.94; Total Problems Score = .97; DSM-Oriented Scales: Affective Problems = .82; Anxiety Problems = .72; Somatic Problems = .75; ADHD Problems = .84; Oppositional Defiant Problems = .86; Conduct Problems = .91
Inter-rater reliability (Pearson rs between mother and father ratings)	Adequate	Empirically Based Scales: Anxious/Depressed = .68; Withdrawn/Depressed = .69; Somatic Complaints = .65; Social Problems = .77; Thought Problems = .75; Attention Problems = .73; Rule-Breaking Behavior = .85; Aggressive Behavior = .82; Internalizing Broad Band Score = .72; Externalizing Broad Band Score =.85; Total Problems Score = .80; DSM-Oriented Scales: Affective Problems = .69; Anxiety Problems = .66; Somatic Problems = .63; ADHD Problems = .70; Oppositional Defiant Problems = .74; Conduct Problems = .88
Test-retest reliability	Adequate	r = .85 for the preschool version and r = .90 for the school-age version over 6–18 days.

=== Diagnostic performance ===
Based on a 2024 systematic literature review and meta analysis commissioned by the Patient-Centered Outcomes Research Institute (PCORI), the CBCL is the most frequently evaluated tool for the diagnosis of ADHD. Though research evaluating its usefulness has used different cutoffs, and has examined both the attention deficit/hyperactivity problems subscale as well as other CBCL subscales, results have generally shown high levels of sensitivity, indicating that the CBCL can successfully identify between 71 percent and 84 percent of individuals with ADHD as positive for the disorder. Specificity estimates in these same studies show that the CBCL successfully designated between 33 percent and 93 percent of individuals who do not have ADHD as negative for the disorder. Another 2024 systematic review found that while the CBCL has good diagnostic performance, results can vary depending on the subscale used and the population being assessed. A systematic review published in 2025 reported that the 8-item Obsessive-Compulsive Subscale (CBCL-OCD/OCS) has moderate diagnostic accuracy (AUC 0.84) for identifying probable OCD in youth, supporting its use as a screening tool for specialist referral.
