= Thomas M. Achenbach =

US psychologist

Thomas M. Achenbach (1940–2023) was Professor of Psychiatry and Psychology and President of the nonprofit Research Center for Children, Youth, and Families at the University of Vermont. His research on syndromes of psychopathology gave rise to the terms “Internalizing” and “Externalizing”. His book in 1974 about developmental psychopathology was important to the foundation of this research area.

== Early life and education ==
Achenbach was born in Stamford, Connecticut, and grew up in Wethersfield, Connecticut. He earned his bachelor's degree summa cum laude from Yale University and spent a postgraduate year at the University of Heidelberg as a German Government Fellow. He earned his Ph.D. in psychology at the University of Minnesota, followed by an NIMH Postdoctoral Fellowship at the Yale Child Study Center.

He married his research collaborator, Leslie Rescorla in 2000. His previous marriage had ended in divorce.

== Career ==
Achenbach served as Assistant Professor and then associate professor in the Department of Psychology and the Child Study Center at Yale from 1967 through 1975. In 1971–72, he was a Social Science Research Council Senior Faculty Fellow at Jean Piaget's Centre d'Epistémologie Génétique in Geneva, Switzerland. From 1975 through 1980, he was a Research Psychologist in the Laboratory of Developmental Psychology at the National Institute of Mental Health, where he served on the Research Advisory Group to the Director of the institute. Since 1980, he has been Professor of Psychiatry and Psychology at the University of Vermont, where he was Director of Child and Adolescent Psychiatry from 1984 through 2007. He has been Chair of the American Psychological Association’s Task Force on Classification of Children's Behavior and a member of the American Psychiatric Association’s Task Force on DSM-III-R. In 2000, he founded the nonprofit Research Center for Children, Youth, and Families at the University of Vermont and has served as President of the Center since it was founded. He has given some 400 invited presentations in 45 countries.

== The Achenbach System of Empirically Based Assessment (ASEBA) ==
Achenbach and his colleagues have developed a family of standardized instruments for assessing people's behavioral, emotional, social, and thought problems, competencies, adaptive functioning, and strengths. The instruments are collectively known as the Achenbach System of Empirically Based Assessment. They are available in over 100 languages and their use has been reported in some 10,000 publications by 15,000 authors from over 100 cultures. Details can be obtained at www.aseba.org. The ASEBA includes developmentally calibrated rating forms completed by parents and teachers of 1½-5 and 6-18-year-olds. The most widely used form is the Child Behavior Checklist (CBCL), which has been cited in some 40,000 publications. The ASEBA also includes self-report forms completed by 11-18-year-olds, 18-59-year-olds, and people over the age of 59. For ages 18–59 and 60-90+, the ASEBA includes forms completed by collaterals, i.e., people who know the adult who is being assessed, such as spouses, partners, friends, family members, and therapists. Other ASEBA forms are designed to assess children on the basis of observations by psychologists who administer tests to the children, by clinical interviewers, and by observers in settings such as classrooms and group activities.

The problem items of the ASEBA forms are scored on profiles of syndromes identified via statistical analyses of assessment data from hundreds of thousands of respondents in dozens of societies. The problem items are also scored on scales that correspond to diagnostic categories of the American Psychiatric Association's Diagnostic and Statistical Manual (the DSM). Additional scales assess broad-spectrum Internalizing and Externalizing patterns of problems. The ASEBA forms also assess competencies, adaptive functioning, and personal strengths.

To enable users to compare scores obtained by individuals who are being assessed with scores obtained by peers, norms are provided that are derived from scores obtained by individuals sampled from relevant populations. Data from hundreds of thousands of respondents assessed by indigenous researchers in over 50 societies have been used to construct multicultural norms. The multicultural norms enable users to compare scores obtained by particular individuals with scores obtained by peers in societies relevant to those individuals. There are separate norms for females and males, different age groups, and forms completed by particular informants, such as parents, teachers, and adult collaterals.

Because people's functioning may vary from one context and interaction partner to another, the ASEBA assesses people from multiple perspectives. Various ASEBA forms are designed to be completed by people who see the person who is being assessed in different contexts, as well as forms completed by the person who is being assessed. The importance of obtaining information from multiple perspectives has been demonstrated by meta-analytic findings of substantial disparities between ratings of children's problems by mothers, fathers, teachers, mental health workers, observers, and children themselves (Achenbach, McConaughy, & Howell, 1987). The disparities between different informants indicate that each informant may provide different information about a child. Consequently, valid assessment requires information from multiple informants, such as a child's mother, father, and teacher(s), as well as from the child. The Achenbach et al. (1987) meta-analytic findings have had a major impact on assessment of children for clinical and research purposes, as attested by citations in over 6,000 publications and being described by De Los Reyes and Kazdin as “among the most robust findings in clinical child research”. Meta-analyses by Achenbach, Krukowski, Dumenci, and Ivanova (2005) also found substantial disparities between collateral and self-ratings of adults. These disparities indicate that assessment of adults should include information from collaterals, as well as from the adults who are being assessed.

To facilitate use of multi-informant data, ASEBA software provides systematic comparisons between ratings and scale scores obtained from multiple informants. Moreover, the ASEBA Multicultural Family Assessment Module (MFAM) enables users to compare multi-informant data for children and their parents on syndromes that have counterparts for ages 6–18 and 18–59. The syndromes that have counterparts for ages 6–18 and 18-59 comprise attention problems, aggressive behavior, rule-breaking behavior, anxiety, depression, social withdrawal, thought problems, and somatic complaints without apparent medical cause. If users deem it appropriate for particular families, they can show family members the MFAM results obtained prior to mental health services, plus results obtained at reassessments during and following services.

Current editions of ASEBA Forms use gender-neutral terminology and provide options for nonbinary scoring.

== Bibliography ==
Achenbach has authored more than 300 publications, including over 30 books, monographs, and assessment manuals.

- Bérubé, R.L., & Achenbach, T.M. (2015). Bibliography of published studies using the Achenbach System of Empirically Based Assessment (ASEBA). Burlington, VT: University of Vermont Research Center for Children, Youth, and Families.

=== Books ===
- Achenbach, Thomas M (1982). Developmental psychopathology. New York: Wiley. ISBN 978-0-471-05536-5. OCLC 8283189.
- Achenbach, Thomas M. (2000). Manual for the ASEBA preschool forms & profiles : an integrated system of multi-informant assessment. ASEBA. ISBN 0-17-608557-2. OCLC 1132461187.
- Achenbach, T.M., & Rescorla, L.A. (2001). Manual for the ASEBA School-Age Forms & Profiles. Burlington, VT: University of Vermont Research Center for Children, Youth, and Families.
- McConaughy, S.H., & Achenbach, T.M. (2001). Manual for the Semistructured Clinical Interview for Children and Adolescents (2nd ed.). Burlington, VT: University of Vermont Research Center for Children, Youth, and Families.
- Achenbach, T.M., & Rescorla, L.A. (2003). Manual for the ASEBA Adult Forms & Profiles. Burlington, VT: University of Vermont Research Center for Children, Youth, and Families.
- Achenbach, T.M., Newhouse, P.A., & Rescorla, L.A. (2004). Manual for the ASEBA Older Adult Forms & Profiles. Burlington, VT: University of Vermont Research Center for Children, Youth, and Families.
- McConaughy, S.H., & Achenbach, T.M. (2004). Manual for the Test Observation Form for Ages 2–18. Burlington, VT: University of Vermont Research Center for Children, Youth, and Families.
- Achenbach, T.M., & Rescorla, L.A. (2007). Multicultural supplement to the Manual for the ASEBA School-Age Forms & Profiles. Burlington, VT: University of Vermont Research Center for Children, Youth, and Families.
- Achenbach, T.M. (2009). The Achenbach System of Empirically Based Assessment (ASEBA): Development, findings, theory, and applications. Burlington, VT: University of Vermont Research Center for Children, Youth, and Families.
- McConaughy, S.H., & Achenbach, T.M. (2009). Manual for the ASEBA Direct Observation Form. Burlington, VT: University of Vermont Research Center for Children, Youth, and Families.
- Achenbach, T.M., & Rescorla, L.A. (2010). Multicultural supplement to the Manual for the ASEBA Preschool Forms & Profiles. Burlington, VT: University of Vermont Research Center for Children, Youth, and Families.
- American Psychiatric Association. (2013). Diagnostic and statistical manual of mental disorders (5th ed.). Washington, DC: Author.
- M., Achenbach, Thomas (2013). DSM-oriented guide for the Achenbach system of empirically based assessment (ASEBA). ASEBA. ISBN 978-1-932975-20-8. OCLC 1055580808.
- Achenbach, T.M., & Rescorla, L.A. (2015). Multicultural supplement to the Manual for the ASEBA Adult Forms & Profiles. Burlington, VT: University of Vermont Research Center for Children, Youth, and Families.
- Achenbach, T.M., Rescorla, L.A., & Ivanova, M.Y. (2015). Guide to family assessment using the ASEBA. Burlington, VT: University of Vermont Research Center for Children, Youth, and Families.

=== Articles and essays ===
- Achenbach, Thomas M. (1966). "The classification of children's psychiatric symptoms: A factor-analytic study". Psychological Monographs: General and Applied. 80 (7): 1–37. doi:10.1037/h0093906. ISSN 0096-9753. PMID 5968338.
- Achenbach, Thomas M.; McConaughy, Stephanie H.; Howell, Catherine T. (1987). "Child/adolescent behavioral and emotional problems: Implications of cross-informant correlations for situational specificity". Psychological Bulletin. 101 (2): 213–232. doi:10.1037/0033-2909.101.2.213. ISSN 1939-1455. PMID 3562706.
- Achenbach, Thomas M.; Krukowski, Rebecca A.; Dumenci, Levent; Ivanova, Masha Y. (2005). "Assessment of Adult Psychopathology: Meta-Analyses and Implications of Cross-Informant Correlations". Psychological Bulletin. 131 (3): 361–382. doi:10.1037/0033-2909.131.3.361. ISSN 1939-1455. PMID 15869333.
- Achenbach, Thomas M.; Ivanova, Masha Y.; Rescorla, Leslie A. (2017). "Empirically based assessment and taxonomy of psychopathology for ages 1½–90+ years: Developmental, multi-informant, and multicultural findings". Comprehensive Psychiatry. 79: 4–18. doi:10.1016/j.comppsych.2017.03.006. PMID 28356192.
- Achenbach, Thomas M. (2018), "Achenbach System of Empirically Based Assessment (ASEBA)", Encyclopedia of Clinical Neuropsychology, Cham: Springer International Publishing, pp. 26–33, doi:10.1007/978-3-319-57111-9_1529, ISBN 978-3-319-57110-2

== Key publications ==
Achenbach, T.M. (1974, 1982). Developmental psychopathology. New York: Ronald Press; (2nd ed.) New York: Wiley.

Achenbach, T.M. (2009). The Achenbach System of Empirically Based Assessment (ASEBA): Development, findings, theory, and applications. Burlington, VT: University of Vermont Research Center for Children, Youth, and Families.

Achenbach, T.M., Krukowski, R.A., Dumenci, L., & Ivanova, M.Y. (2005). Assessment of adult psychopathology: Meta-analyses and implications of cross-informant correlations. Psychological Bulletin, 131, 361–382. doi:10.1037/0033-2909.131.3.361

Achenbach, T.M., McConaughy, S.H., & Howell, C.T. (1987). Child/adolescent behavioral and emotional problems: Implications of cross-informant correlations for situational specificity. Psychological Bulletin, 101, 213–232. doi:10.1037/0033-2909.101.2.213

Achenbach, T.M., & Rescorla, L.A. (2007). Multicultural understanding of child and adolescent psychopathology: Implications for mental health assessment. New York: Guilford Press.

Achenbach, T.M., & Rescorla, L.A. (2015). Multicultural supplement to the Manual for the ASEBA Adult Forms & Profiles. Burlington, VT: University of Vermont Research Center for Children, Youth, and Families.

Achenbach, T.M., Rescorla, L.A., & Ivanova, M.Y. (2015). Guide to family assessment using the ASEBA. Burlington, VT: University of Vermont Research Center for Children, Youth, and Families.

Achenbach, T.M., & Rescorla, L.A. (2019). Multicultural supplement to the Manual for The ASEBA Older Adult Forms & Profiles. Burlington, VT: University of Vermont Research Center for Children, Youth and Families
