= Psyche (consciousness journal) =

- Discipline: Consciousness studies
- Language: English
- Edited by: Stephanie Ortigue

Publication details
- History: 1994–2010
- Publisher: Association for the Scientific Study of Consciousness
- Frequency: Biannually
- Open access: Yes

Standard abbreviations
- ISO 4: Psyche (Clayton)

Indexing
- ISSN: 1039-723X
- OCLC no.: 67943271

Links
- Journal homepage; Archive at journalpsyche.org

Psyche: The Official Journal of the Association for the Scientific Study of Consciousness was an online peer-reviewed academic journal covering studies on consciousness and its relation to the brain from perspectives provided by the disciplines of cognitive science, philosophy, psychology, physics, neuroscience, artificial intelligence, and anthropology. It was established in 1993. In 2008 it became the official journal of the Association for the Scientific Study of Consciousness. Psyche is no longer accepting articles, but the archive remains accessible.
