= William James Prize =

American award for the empirical or philosophical study of consciousness

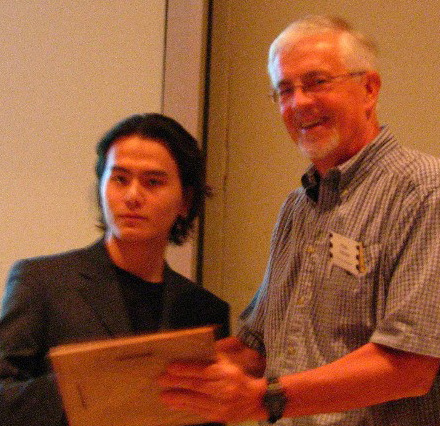
Hakwan Lau receiving the 2005 William James award from the then chair of the Prize committee, Phil Merikle

The William James Prize for Contributions to the Study of Consciousness is an award given by the Association for the Scientific Study of Consciousness (ASSC).

Each year one prize is awarded for an outstanding published contribution to the empirical or philosophical study of consciousness by a graduate student or postdoctoral scholar within seven years of receiving a PhD or other advanced degree. Up until 2025 eligibility for the award was even more restrictive, as only candidates within five years of completing their PhD (or other advanced degree) were considered.

The prize consists of:

1. An award of $1500 USD (formerly $1000);
2. Invitation to present a plenary address at the next meeting of the ASSC;
3. Lifetime membership in the ASSC.

== William James Prize Winners (ASSC) ==
The table below names the most recent winners, recognizing an exceptional published work in the empirical or philosophical research of consciousness by a scholar early in their career.

Year Awarded	Recipient	Title of Winning Contribution
2026	Nadine Dijkstra	"A neural basis for distinguishing imagination from reality"
2025	Abhilash Dwarakanath	"Bistability of prefrontal states gates access to consciousness"
2024	Shervin Safavi	"Multistability, perceptual value, and internal foraging"
2023	Elisabeth Parés Pujolràs	"Latent awareness: Early conscious access to motor preparation processes is linked to the readiness potential"
2022	Ishan Singhal	"Time and time again: a multi-scale hierarchical framework for time-consciousness and timing of cognition"
2021	Anat Arzi	"Olfactory sniffing signals consciousness in unresponsive patients with brain injuries"
2020	Jake Quilty-Dunn	"Is Iconic Memory Iconic?"
2019	Vincent Taschereau-Dumouchel	"Towards an unconscious neural reinforcement intervention for common fears"
2018	Jennifer Windt	Dreaming: A conceptual framework for philosophy of mind and empirical research

Note: The prize recognizes work published within a specific time frame (five years prior to 2025, now seven years) of the scholar receiving their advanced degree. The date listed is the year the award was conferred.

The exact year of the first award is not explicitly stated in one place, historical documents indicate the prize was being regularly awarded by the early 2000s. The ASSC website mentions that the 2025 prize was the 22nd edition, which would imply the first award was in 2004.
