= Behavioural Processes =

Monthly scientific journal

- Discipline: Behavior analysis, ethology
- Language: English
- Edited by: Johan J. Bolhuis, Olga Lazareva

Publication details
- History: 1976–present
- Publisher: Elsevier
- Frequency: Monthly
- Impact factor: 1.3 (2022)

Standard abbreviations
- ISO 4: Behav. Process.
- NLM: Behav Processes

Indexing
- CODEN: BPRODA
- ISSN: 0376-6357 (print); 1872-8308 (web)
- LCCN: 77643118
- OCLC no.: 02497823

Links
- Journal homepage; Online archive

Behavioural Processes is a monthly peer-reviewed scientific journal covering the field of ethology. It was established in 1976 and is published by Elsevier. The editors-in-chief are Johan J. Bolhuis (Utrecht University) and Olga Lazareva (Drake University). According to the Journal Citation Reports, the journal has a 2022 impact factor of 1.3.
