= Richard Solomon (psychologist) =

American psychologist

Richard Lester Solomon (October 2, 1918 – October 12, 1995) was a psychologist well known for his work with in comparative psychology, as well as his opponent-process theory of emotion.

Solomon attended Brown University, where he earned a bachelor's degree (A.B.) in 1940, a master's degree (A.M.) in 1942, and a doctorate (Ph.D.) in 1947.

Solomon won several awards for his scientific achievements, including the Distinguished Scientific Contribution award of the American Psychological Association and the Howard Crosby WARREN Medal of the Society of Experimental Psychologists. Additionally, he was elected to both the American Academy of Arts and Sciences and the National Academy of Sciences. He also held several honorary posts, and edited the Psychological Review.

He known for his development of the Solomon four-group design. While the design can assess the impact of a treatment in psychological or medical research, the design is also helpful in assessing pre-test sensitization, i.e., the influence of a pre-test on an outcome. The Solomon Four-Group Design can also help in assessing a pre-test-by-treatment interaction.

During his time at Harvard University, Solomon conducted research into avoidance learning. In his experiments, he placed dogs into shuttle boxes with two chambers. The lights would then come on in the side where the dog was. A few seconds later, one half of the chamber would become electrified. To avoid shock, the dog would run to the other chamber. Eventually, the dogs learned to avoid shock entirely by running to the other side in the interval between lighting and electrification.

== See also ==
- Solomon Four Group Design

== Sources ==
- "Biographical memoirs" from the National Academy of Sciences
