= Synaptic noise =

Type of activity in neurons

Synaptic noise refers to the constant bombardment of synaptic activity in neurons. This occurs in the background of a cell when potentials are produced without the nerve stimulation of an action potential, and are due to the inherently random nature of synapses. These random potentials have similar time courses as excitatory postsynaptic potentials (EPSPs) and inhibitory postsynaptic potentials (IPSPs), yet they lead to variable neuronal responses. The variability is due to differences in the discharge times of action potentials.

== Causes ==
Many types of noise exist in cells. First, there is intrinsic noise and extrinsic, or synaptic, noise. Within each category there are two further divisions of noise – voltage noise or temporal noise. Intrinsic voltage noise is due to random changes in the membrane potential of a cell, and intrinsic temporal noise is caused by variations in spike generation timing. The following sections give explanations about the causes of synaptic noise.

=== Quantal release ===
Both synaptic voltage and temporal noise are due to the probability associated with transmitter release. In an action potential, calcium channels are opened by depolarization and release Ca^{2+} ions into the presynaptic cell. This causes neurotransmitters, which are kept in vesicles, to be released into the synapse. Vesicles are released in quanta – packets that contain roughly 7,000 molecules of transmitters. The likelihood of quanta being released is assigned a probability that increases when the action potential arrives at synaptic terminals, and progressively decreases to a lower, resting value. Therefore, the uncertainty involved in the exact timing of neurotransmitter release is a cause for synaptic temporal noise. Furthermore, the strength of the postsynaptic response varies based on the number of quanta released. Quantal release results in the inconsistent strength and timing of a response, and this is cause for synaptic voltage noise.

=== Background activity ===
Another cause of noise is due to the exocytosis of neurotransmitters from the synaptic terminals that provide input to a given neuron. This occurrence happens in the background while a cell is at resting membrane potential. Since it is happening in the background, the release is not due to a signal, but is random. This unpredictability adds to the synaptic noise level.

Synaptic noise shows up as miniature postsynaptic current, which is observed without any presynaptic input. These spontaneous currents are due to randomly released neurotransmitter vesicles. This is caused by the stochastic "opening of intracellular Ca^{2+} stores, synaptic Ca^{2+}-channel noise, spontaneous triggering of the vesicle-release pathway, or spontaneous fusion of a vesicle with the membrane."

=== Chemical sensing ===
Chemical sensing, such as that of taste and smell which rely on an external chemical stimulus, is affected by thermodynamics. Chemical molecules arrive at the appropriate receptor at random times based on the rate of diffusion of these particles. Also, receptors can't perfectly count the number of signaling molecules that pass through. These two factors are additional causes of synaptic noise.

== How the CNS manages noise ==
The central nervous system (CNS) deals with noise in two ways – averaging and prior knowledge.

=== Averaging ===
Averaging occurs whenever redundant information is given to a sensory input or generated by the CNS itself. When several units of cellular processing carry the same signal but are affected by different sources of noise, averaging can counter the noise. This occurrence can be seen when sensory inputs couple to work together or overlap, so that they can take an average of incoming signals and random stimuli.

Averaging is also seen at divergent synapses, where one signal provides input to many neurons. It can be advantageous to send a signal multiple times over many axons and combine the information at the end, rather than to send the signal once over a single, long, noisy neuron. This means that in order for the fidelity of the signal to be preserved, the initial signal must be reliable. At the final destination, signals are averaged and noise can be offset.

=== Prior knowledge ===
Prior knowledge is also used when facing noise. In sensory neurons that receive redundant and structured signals, sensory processing can differentiate the signal from noise. This occurrence is known as the matched filter principle, whereby a neuron can use past experience about an expected input to distinguish noise from the actual signal and consequently reduce the impact of noise.

== In the hippocampus ==
The significance of synaptic noise has become clear through ongoing research of the brain, specifically the hippocampus. The hippocampus is a region of the forebrain in the medial temporal lobe closely associated with memory formation and recollection. Gamma and theta oscillations, released during exploratory activities, create modulated rhythms that transform into prolonged excitation, and furthermore into memories or improper potentiation. These oscillations can be partially composed of synaptic currents or synaptic noise. There is recent evidence that supports the role of synaptic noise in the signal functions within the hippocampus, and therefore in memories, whether solidifying or interfering.

This focus is greatly reliant on stochastic resonance. From notable research by Stacey and Durand, synaptic noise has been credited for enhanced detection of weak or distal synaptic inputs within the hippocampus. Using a computer model, subthreshold currents were simulated in the CA3 region that directly correlated with increased CA1 action potential activity when small currents were introduced. This is an example of a commonly ostracized natural occurrence that dampens important signals can now be studied and utilized for therapeutic reasons to aid neural plasticity.

Common injuries in the hippocampus region can result in schizophrenia, epilepsy, Parkinson's and Alzheimer's diseases. Synaptic noise may be part of the development of these illnesses, however, sufficient research has not been conducted. A possible relevance is the inability of synaptic noise to fine-tune or regulate proper summation into a message. If weak signals cannot be enhanced with existing noise, synaptic plasticity is compromised, and memory and personality will be impacted. The research of Stacey and Durand helped shape this new direction in the analysis and pharmaceutical development to combat hippocampal illnesses.

== In sensory neurons ==
Signals and noise in sensory receptors, which allow organisms to encode information based on their senses, set a limit on a given sensation. Often it is necessary to amplify a weak signal in order for it to be of use. For amplification to help, the signal at the synapse must be more intensified than the noise.

For example, amplification is needed when a single photon of light hits a rod photoreceptor in the retina of an eye. The amplification allows the small stimulus to overcome the noise that is an inherent characteristic of the cell. However, increasing the stimulus also increases the noise. This phenomenon has led to the question of how sensory receptors can lower synaptic noise effectively while amplifying the signal to reach threshold.

The sensitivity of a neuron increases when information from many receptors is collected and integrated - an event called pooling. While this allows a cell to focus predominantly on the actions that are directly involved with the stimulus, it also combines the noise, which increases the overall amount of noise present in the system.

A sensory neuron's efficiency can be increased further if noise is eliminated as early as possible before pooling occurs, through linear filtering. The removal of noise in the beginning is crucial because once a signal and noise with similar timings combine, it is harder to separate them. Linear filtering involves the removal of noise with time frequencies that aren't associated with a given stimulus response. This removes events that are slower than the response, or not connected to the receptor in question.

== Implications ==
=== As a negative factor ===
Noise in neurons is due to intrinsic and extrinsic sources. It can disrupt activity and interfere with how well a neuron can encode a signal. Noise is observed as changes in the membrane potential of a cell. The change in potential causes the accuracy of a neuron to be limited in its transmission. This limited transmission has been coined the signal-to-noise ratio. As noise levels increase, one would assume a lowered ratio and therefore diminished signals. A diminished signal can be detrimental to a cell if neuronal maintenance is disrupted, or more importantly a necessary inhibitory response is lost. Noise limits the fidelity of a neuron's response to a signal or stimulus. The accuracy of the signal will impact how well higher parts of the brain or sensory system process information from the neurons.

=== As a positive factor ===
Stochastic resonance is the term given to an instance when synaptic noise aids, rather than impairs, signal detection. With stochastic resonance, synaptic noise can amplify the recognition of signals that are below threshold potential in nonlinear, threshold-detecting systems. This is important in cells that receive and integrate thousands of synaptic inputs. These cells can often require numerous synaptic events to occur at the same time in order to produce an action potential, so the potential for receiving subthreshold signals is high. Signals from neurons that integrate activity of various neurons, when taken together, can form a complete image stimulus.

Noise also allows neurons to detect weak visual signals by processing the level of contrast of the image.

Another positive use of synaptic noise is by involving frozen noise. Frozen noise refers to random current pulses of varying amplitudes being applied to the constant current input, and then maintaining this pattern so that it can be used to observe differences in other factors. Frozen noise allows researchers to reveal whether or not part of a neuron's response is dependent on a given stimulus because the other interfering conditions are held constant.

== Physiological relevance ==
Synaptic noise has been associated with high frequency oscillations (HFOs) within the brain. HFOs are imperative to normal brain function, and research has shown that synaptic noise may be a potential initiator of HFOs. HFOs between 60–70 Hz have been recorded as normal activity within the brain by EEG (electroencephalography) recordings, however frequencies within the ranges of 100–200 Hz, also called ripples, have been associated with epilepsy. Ripples, however, are not entirely abnormal nor regular. "Ripples have been used to describe both abnormal activity associated with epileptiform sharp waves and normal behaviors such as physiological sharp waves and memory consolidation."

Synaptic noise is not only caused by mass signaling from surrounding neuronal impulses, but also from the direct signaling within the neuron itself. During episodes of epilepsy, the impulses fired are of greater magnitude and frequency than normal. Transient signaling, or more specifically noise, may shorten the resting potential in order to allow for quicker neural firing.

There is also evidence which supports the fact that epilepsy may be one cause of synaptic noise. During an epileptic seizure, tertiary bursts of action potential occur through the neurons in the brain. Neurons fire off randomly and rapidly creating the convulsive effect which the patient exhibits during the seizure. Before these bursts, there is an increase in the extracellular potassium concentrations of the neurons. "Potassium is expected to rise during epileptic discharges, and we have preliminary evidence from ventral slices exposed to bicuculline that potassium rises to a threshold value of ~9 mM just prior to the onset of tertiary bursts." The increased potassium concentrations outside the neuron can increase terminal excitability, causing possible action potential firing, which leads to synaptic noise.

== Current research ==
It is believed that by first understanding channel noise, one might be able to more fully understand synaptic noise. Channel noise is the variability in neuronal responses that is generated by the random gating of voltage-gated ion channels such as those for potassium or sodium, vital components of an action potential. This prerequisite need is proposed since both channel and synaptic noise limit the reliability of responsiveness to stimuli in neurons, as well as both being voltage dependent.

To understand the future of synaptic noise research, it would be essential to discuss the work of Alain Destexhe, a Belgian doctor who has greatly studied the importance of synaptic noise in neuronal connections. He uses the dynamic-clamp technique to understand the presence and characteristics of noise. While voltage-gated clamps record configurations, dynamic-clamp allows for the control of conductance by way of computer. A computational model of synaptic noise is created and is then implemented into the neuron, simulating synaptic noise. This can be used to compare with in-vivo conditions. Destexhe states that future research can be directed towards four possible ways, in reflection of his research with dynamic-clamp. First, it could be beneficial to understand the control of synaptic noise so that the modulation of noise can be used on humans to turn unresponsive networks into a responsive state. Next, it would be necessary to understand how external noise interacts with internal neuronal properties more fully to coincide models with experimental facts. There also exists the need to further investigate experimentally the methods of dendritic integration and the role of synaptic noise when it is present. Finally, he found support that synaptic noise enhances temporal resolution in neurons, yet experimental proof has not been done to further elaborate on past modeling studies. By use of dynamic-clamp, these pieces of information clarify the role of synaptic noise in the brain and how it can be harnessed for specific therapies.

More information is necessary to understand the role that noise plays in schizophrenia. However, schizophrenics and their siblings who don't have schizophrenia seem to have an increased level of noise in their prefrontal cortical information processing circuits. Abnormalities in the prefrontal cortex might cause some of the symptoms associated with schizophrenia, such as auditory hallucinations, delusional states, and impacts on the working memory. Knowing how noise affects the signaling in this area of the brain, for example, not being able to distinguish noise from a signal, might provide more information on why these abnormalities occur.

Functional magnetic resonance imaging (fMRI) is affected by noise. Noise that is present during scanning can impact the integrity of an image by introducing an aspect of uncertainty through noise. More research is needed to know whether this noise is specifically synaptic noise, or one of the other types. Furthermore, in order to make fMRI more useful and trustworthy, research on the noise and ways to dampen it are necessary.
