= Achenbach System of Empirically Based Assessment =

- Purpose: assess adaptive and maladaptive behavior

The Achenbach System of Empirically Based Assessment (ASEBA), created by Thomas Achenbach, is collection of questionnaires used to assess adaptive and maladaptive behavior and overall functioning in individuals. The system includes report forms for multiple informants – the Child Behavior Checklist (CBCL) is used for caregivers to fill out ratings of their child's behavior, the Youth Self Report Form (YSR) is used for children to rate their own behavior, and the Teacher Report Form (TRF) is used for teachers to rate their pupil's behavior. The ASEBA seeks to capture consistencies or variations in behavior across different situations and with different interaction partners.

The ASEBA is used in a variety of settings, including mental health, school, research, and forensic settings.

The ASEBA exists for multiple age groups, including preschool-aged children, school-aged children, adults, and older adults. Scores for individuals in each age group are norm-referenced. The ASEBA has been translated in one hundred languages, and has a variety of multicultural applications. Each report form in the ASEBA System has 113 items, but there is not a one-to-one correspondence between each individual item across the different report forms.

== History ==
The ASEBA was created by Thomas Achenbach in 1966 as a response to the Diagnostic and Statistical Manual of Mental Disorders (DSM-I). This first edition of the DSM contained information on only 60 disorders; the only two childhood disorders considered were Adjustment Reaction of Childhood and Schizophrenic Reaction, Childhood Type.

Achenbach used machine learning and principal component analysis when developing the ASEBA in order to cluster symptoms together when forming the assessment's eight categories. This approach ignored the syndrome clusters found in the DSM-I, instead relying on patterns found in case records of children with identified psychopathologies. As a result of this, the ASEBA was able to identify more syndromes than originally identified in the DSM-I. Additionally, this reliance on real-world case records allows the ASEBA to interpret scores in relation to age, gender, and ethnic/racial norms, as symptom/disorder severity and meaning vary across cultures.

== Components ==
The ASEBA consists of many self-report assessments for individuals between the ages of 18 months and 90 years. Below is a list of the self-report assessments currently offered:

Preschool-aged assessments:

- Child Behavior Checklist for Ages1½-5 (CBCL/1½-5) – To be completed by the child's parent or guardian, as the child is too immature to complete the assessment themselves.
- Language Development Survey (LDS) – A subsection of the CBCL/1½-5. This form is completed by the child's parent or guardian and assesses whether the child's vocabulary is delayed relative to norms.
- Caregiver-Teacher Report Form (C-TRF) – To be completed by the child's daycare provider or preschool teacher.
- Test Observation Form (TOF) – For ages 2 through 18.

School-age assessments:

- Child Behavior Checklist for Ages 6-18 (CBCL/6-18)
- Teacher's Report Form (TRF)
- Youth Self-Report (YSR)
- Brief Problem Monitor for Ages 6-18 (BPM-P/6-18, BPM-T/6-18, or BPM-Y/6-18, depending on whether the form is completed by the teacher, parent, or youth)
- Semistructured Clinical Interview for Children and Adolescents (SCICA)
- Direct Observation Form (DOF) – For ages 6 through 11.

Adult assessments:

- Adult Self-Report (ASR) – To be completed by the adult. This assesses the adult's adaptive functioning, strengths, and problems.
- Adult Behavior Checklist (ABCL) – To be completed by a known individual of the adult, meant to reflect answers provided on the ASR.
- Brief Problem Monitor for Ages 18-59 (BPM/18-59)

Older adult assessments:

- Older Adult Self-Report 60-90+ (OASR)
- Older Adult Behavior Checklist 60-90+ (OABCL)

The ASEBA also provides multicultural supplements for the provided self-report assessments, allowing for comparison of selected scores with the norms from the non-standard culture. Additionally, the ASEBA forms have been translated into over 110 languages, although not every form is available in each language.

== Scales and scoring ==
Each ASEBA assessment consists of 113 items, which are used to provide a score report of 7 to 8 scales. Each item is not directly correlated with a specific scale, as the assessments recognize patterns of syndromes as belonging to a specific scale. These include:

	CBCL/1½-5	C-TRF	CBCL/6-18	TRF	YSR	ABCL	ASR	OABCL	OASR
Emotionally Reactive	x	x							
Anxious/Depressed	x	x	x	x	x	x	x	x	x
Somatic Complaints	x	x	x	x	x	x	x	x	x
Withdrawn	x	x	x	x	x	x	x		
Attention Problems	x	x	x	x	x	x	x		
Aggressive Behavior	x	x	x	x	x	x	x		
Sleep Problems	x								
Social Problems			x	x	x				
Thought Problems			x	x	x	x	x	x	x
Rule-Breaking Behavior			x	x	x	x	x		
Intrusive						x	x	x	x
Worries								x	x
Functional Impairment								x	x
Memory/Cognition Problems								x	x
Irritable/Disinhibited								x	x

The score reports list the individual's total score, as well as their t-score and the related percentile. The score reports also include Internalizing, Externalizing, and Total Problems scales.
