= Darensbourg =

Darensbourg is a surname. Notable people with the surname include:

- Donald J. Darensbourg (born 1941), American chemist
- Joe Darensbourg (1906–1985), American clarinetist and saxophonist
- Marcetta Y. Darensbourg, American chemist
- Vic Darensbourg (born 1970), American baseball pitcher
