= Jiri Jonas =

Chemist and professor

- Born: April 1, 1932 (age 94); Prague, Czech Republic
- Education: University of Prague, Czechoslovak Academy of Sciences
- Spouse: Ana (Masiulis) Jonas
- Scientific career
- Fields: Physical chemistry
- Workplaces: University of Illinois at Urbana-Champaign, Beckman Institute for Advanced Science and Technology
- Doctoral advisor: Josef Pliva

Jiri Jonas (born April 1, 1932, in Prague, Czech Republic) is a professor emeritus of chemistry in the Center for Advanced Study at the University of Illinois at Urbana-Champaign. Jiri Jonas is considered a pioneer in the use of magnetic resonance imaging at high pressure, developing techniques to study the dynamic structure of liquids and proteins. This approach has been used in the study of the arc repressor, a DNA-binding protein containing 53 amino acid residues.

== Education and career ==
Jiri Jonas was awarded his B. S. Degree at the University of Prague in 1956. In 1960 he received his a PhD from the Czechoslovak Academy of Sciences, where he worked with Josef Pliva. He won awards for scientific work from the academy in 1958, 1960 and 1964.

In 1966, Jonas joined became a professor at the University of Illinois at Urbana-Champaign. He became the second director of the Beckman Institute for Advanced Science and Technology at the University of Illinois, and was instrumental in establishing it as an interdisciplinary center. He followed Theodore L. Brown, serving from August 1993 until September 2001, when he was succeeded by Pierre Wiltzius. His colleagues included Harry George Drickamer, Herbert S. Gutowsky, Rudolph A. Marcus, and others. He married biochemist Ana Masiulis on June 1, 1968.

== Research ==
Working in the areas of chemical physics and physical chemistry, Jonas has been particularly interested in reaction kinetics and the behavior of liquids under extreme conditions such as high pressure and extreme heat. He is considered "a pioneer in the use of high-pressure nuclear magnetic resonance and Raman spectroscopy" which he has used to study liquids and their reactions under such conditions. He has developed new experimental techniques involving 1 and 2 dimensional high-resolution and high-pressure nuclear magnetic resonance spectroscopy to study proteins and protein folding. Techniques include Raman and Rayleigh laser scattering methods for spectroscopy, Fourier transform infrared spectroscopy (FTIR) and photo-chemically induced dynamic nuclear polarization (Photo-CIDNP).

"The long-term objective of our work on biochemical systems is to contribute to the understanding of folding of proteins, folding intermediates and structure of pressure denatured states." Jiri Jonas

Jonas has been a co-director of the NATO Advanced Study Institute on High Pressure Chemistry, Biochemistry and Materials Science. He has co-edited High pressure chemistry and biochemistry (1987), High Pressure Chemistry, Biochemistry and Materials Science (1993) and High pressure molecular science (1999).

== Awards and honors ==
Jonas is a member of the American Physical Society (APS) (1982), the National Academy of Sciences (1985), the American Association for the Advancement of Science (1987) and the American Philosophical Society (2003). He was chair of the Division of Chemical Physics of the APS for the 1985–1986 term.

Jonas received a Guggenheim Fellowship in 1972. Jonas was the second recipient of the Joel Hildebrand Award in 1983. The award is given by the American Chemical Society "for distinguished contributions to the understanding of the chemistry and physics of liquids." In 1988 Jonas received an award from the Alexander von Humboldt Foundation of the Federal Republic of Germany, recognizing him as a Senior U.S. Scientist.

The Centro Nacional de Ressonância Magnética Nuclear Jiri Jonas (CNRMN, trans. National Center of Nuclear Magnetic Resonance of Macromolecules Jiri Jonas), founded at the University of Rio de Janeiro in 1997, is named in his honor. It has been directed by Jerson Lima Silva since 1998.
