= Lawrence B. Schook =

Lawrence (Larry) B. Schook
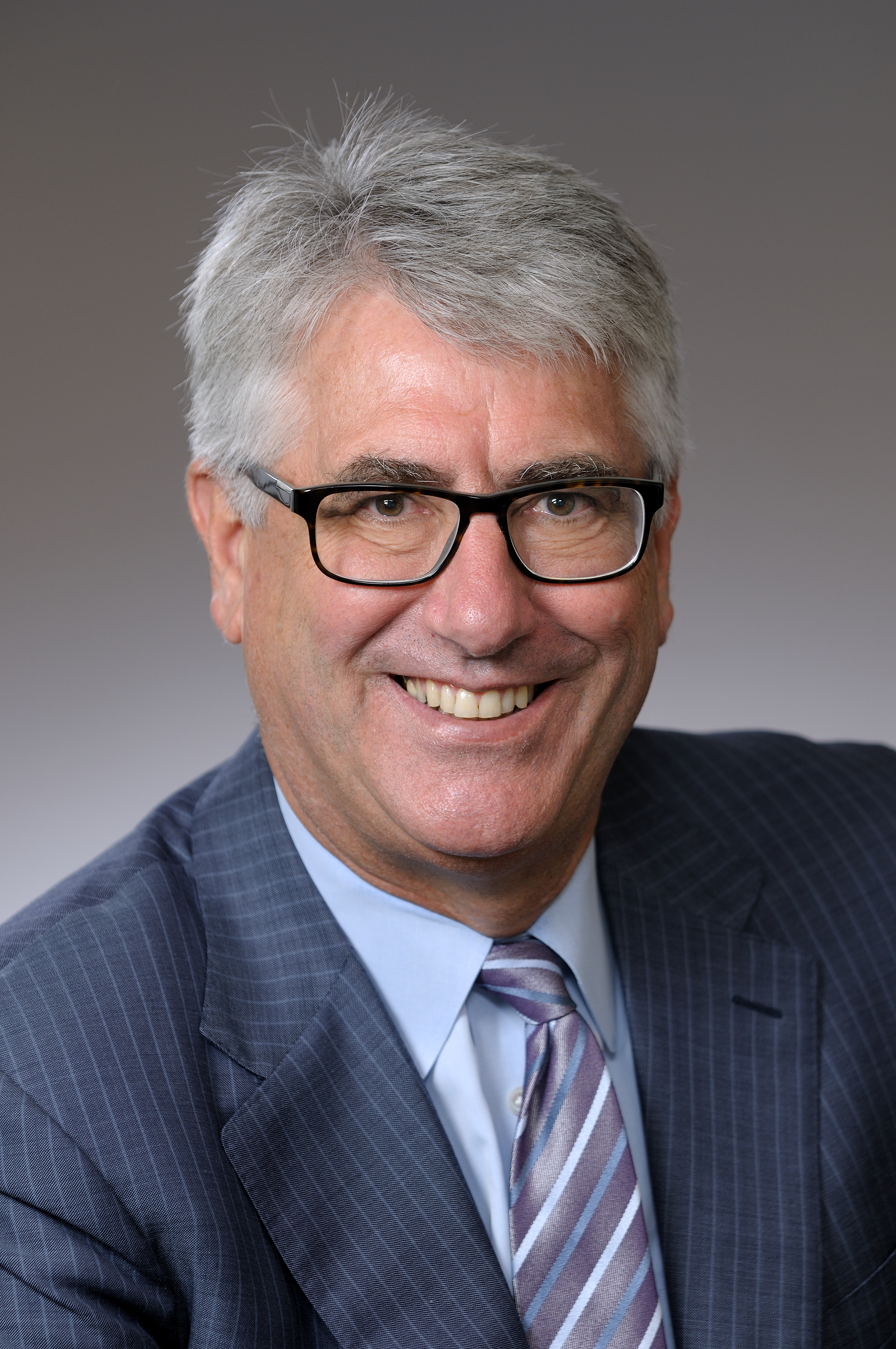
- Dr. Lawrence Schook
- Born: Mount Clemens, Michigan
- Education: Albion College (B.A. biology), Wayne State University (M.S. and Ph.D immunology and microbiology)
- Known for: Leading pig-genome mapping effort involving 40 research institutions and 12 countries
- Awards: Edward William and Jane Marr Gutgsell Professorship, University of Illinois at Urbana-Champaign American Association for the Advancement of Science Fellow Fulbright Distinguished Chair Fellowship, University of Salzburg Distinguished Alumni Award, Albion College
- Scientific career
- Workplaces: University of Illinois, University of Minnesota

Lawrence B. Schook was the vice president for research at the University of Illinois. He oversaw the $1 billion research portfolio across all three campuses (Urbana-Champaign, Chicago, Springfield). A scholar in comparative genomics and the exploitation of genomic diversity to understand traits and disease, Dr. Schook focuses his research on genetic resistance to disease, regenerative medicine, and using genomics to create animal models for biomedical research. He led the international pig genome-sequencing project, which produced a draft of the pig genome allowing researchers to offer insights into diseases that afflict pigs and humans.

== Education ==
He received a bachelor's degree in biology from Albion College (1972) and a master's degree (1975) and a PhD from Wayne State University School of Medicine (1978). He was a postdoctoral fellow at the Institute for Clinical Immunology in Switzerland and the University of Michigan.

== Career ==
Schook was named the vice president for research at the University of Illinois in 2011. He oversaw all technology commercialization and startup activities supporting the university's economic development mission. Under his leadership, the University of Illinois was ranked #11 on the "Top 100 Worldwide Universities Granted U.S. Utility Patents" list, and the units supporting the university's innovation pipeline have been recognized as follows:

- Research Park Cited for Job Creation as Champaign Ranked Third Fastest Growing City in Illinois
- EnterpriseWorks Named a Top 3 College-town Incubator to Watch
- IllinoisVENTURES Ranked #1 in Gap Funding for Third-Party Capital
- Research Park Named Outstanding Research Park

Schook is a professor of animal sciences, bioengineering, pathobiology, nutritional sciences, and pathology and surgery at University of Illinois, and he holds the Edward William and Jane Marr Gutgsell endowed professorship on the Urbana-Champaign campus. He is a professor in the Carl R. Woese Institute for Genomic Biology and holds affiliate faculty appointments at the Beckman Institute for Advanced Science and Technology and the Micro and Nanotechnology Laboratory. He holds an affiliate scientist position at the Carle Foundation Hospital and was co-chair of the Carle Biomedical Research Center Steering Committee. He formerly served as theme leader for Regenerative Biology and Tissue Engineering research theme at the Carl R. Woese Institute for Genomic Biology.

Schook is a faculty fellow at the Academy for Entrepreneurial Leadership (AEL) at the University of Illinois at Urbana-Champaign, which was formed jointly with The Ewing Marion Kauffman Foundation. He developed and taught an animal sciences course, "Creating Value in Life Sciences", that was part of the AEL entrepreneurship curriculum.

He previously served as the director of the Division of Biomedical Sciences (DBS) at the University of Illinois at Urbana-Champaign from 2008 to 2011. In 2007 Schook served on the campus committee that defined the mission and responsibilities of DBS and recommended the unit's establishment to the provost and vice chancellor for research. As the first director of DBS, Schook was responsible for the Faculty Development Program, Translation Biomedical Research Seminar Series, Mayo Illinois Alliance for Technology Based Healthcare, and a partnership between DBS and the Carle Research Institute.

Prior to his career at the University of Illinois, he held faculty and administrative positions at the University of Minnesota. He was associate dean for research and graduate studies in the College of Veterinary Medicine and co-chaired the Provost's Research Design Team for the Academic Health Center. In addition, he was the founding director of the Food Animal Biotechnology Center and the Advanced Genomic Analysis Center.

=== Research ===
Schook's research focuses on genetic resistance to disease, regenerative medicine, and using genomics to create animal models for biomedical research. His scholarly activities include over 200 publications and 6 edited books and he is the founding editor of Animal Biotechnology. He has given over 200 seminars and presentations to congresses and universities around the world and has mentored more than 75 students and 20 postdoctoral fellows. As principal investigator, he has received over $25 million in sponsored research from governmental and industrial sources.

Schook chaired the executive steering committee of the Alliance for Animal Genome Research and served as project director for the International Swine Genome Sequencing Consortium and the International Pig SNP Chip consortium. The genomic analysis revealed unexpected and beneficial similarities, as well as distinct differences, between humans and pigs.

=== Entrepreneurship and innovation ===
Schook led the effort in developing UI LABS, an independent, not-for-profit applied research and training corporation in Chicago focused on multi-disciplinary, multi-institutional collaborations among industry, government, and academia. He led the successful bid by UI LABS to win a $70 million Department of Defense grant to establish the Digital Manufacturing and Design Innovation Institute and secured $10 million from the University of Illinois and state of Illinois to create the Illinois Manufacturing Laboratory, a program designed to increase manufacturing competitiveness for small- and medium-sized manufacturers across the state.

=== Professional service ===
He has served on the Governor's Illinois Innovation Council, the Albion College board of trustees, the Argonne National Laboratory board of governors, the Fermi National Laboratory board of directors, and the National Academy of Sciences Institute for Laboratory Animal Science Roundtable. He has served on the board of directors for the Biotechnology Industry Organization (BIO) and the boards of multiple biotechnology companies.

=== Fellowships and awards ===
Schook is a recipient of NIH, Swiss National Fund, and Pardee Fellowships, an elected Fellow of the American Association for the Advancement of Science, and a Fulbright Distinguished Chair in genomics at the University of Salzburg. He was named a University Scholar at the University of Illinois, holds an Edward William and Jane Marr Gutgsell Professorship, and won the H. H. Mitchell Award for Graduate Teaching and Research. He received the Funk Award for Meritorious Achievements in Agriculture, the Pfizer Animal Health Research Award, and the Albion College Distinguished Alumni Award. In addition, he was named to the 2013 Crain's Tech 50 list.

== In the news ==
- UI, State Officials to Unveil Plans to Boost Manufacturing
- Meet Chicago’s Tech 50 2013
- UI LABS Closing in on Space, Chasing Federal Grant
- If UI LABS Gets Built, This Veteran Researcher is Why
- Research Consortium Decodes the Pig Genome
- Pig Genome Offers Insights Into the Feistiest of Farm Animals
- Governor Quinn Announces Creation of Illinois Innovation Council
- First Draft of the Pig: Researchers Sequence Swine Genome
- Bootstrapping with Dr. Lawrence Schook
- Chicago-based Tech Lab for University of Illinois
