= Jeffrey S. Moore =

American chemist (born 1962)

- Born: 1962 (age 63–64); Joliet, Illinois, U.S.
- Education: University of Illinois at Urbana–Champaign
- Known for: Self-healing material, Mechanochemistry, and Macromolecular architectures
- Scientific career
- Fields: Organic chemistry, Materials science & Engineering
- Workplaces: University of Illinois at Urbana–Champaign; University of Michigan
- Doctoral advisor: Samuel I. Stupp
- Doctoral students: Jennifer M. Heemstra, Mary L. Kraft
- Website: http://sulfur.scs.uiuc.edu/index.html

Jeffrey S. Moore

Director of the Beckman Institute for Advanced Science and Technology at the University of Illinois
- Incumbent
- Assumed office 2017

External videos
- Jeffrey Moore “College Coaching for Training 21st Century Minds”, TEDxUIUC

Jeffrey Scott Moore (born 1962) is the Murchison-Mallory Professor of Chemistry and a Professor of Materials Science & Engineering at the University of Illinois at Urbana–Champaign. He has received awards for both teaching and research, and as of 2014, was named a Howard Hughes Medical Institute Professor. In 2017, he was named director of the Beckman Institute for Advanced Science and Technology at the University of Illinois, after serving as Interim Director for one year.

== Early life and education ==
Jeffrey Scott Moore was born in 1962 near Joliet, Illinois. He was awarded his B.S. in chemistry in 1984 and his Ph.D. in materials science and engineering in 1989, both from the University of Illinois at Urbana–Champaign. At Illinois, he worked with Samuel I. Stupp on the molecular organization of polymers, and developed a new room temperature technique for the polyesterification of high molecular weight polyesters.

== Career ==
After briefly working as an NSF postdoctoral fellow at the California Institute of Technology with Robert H. Grubbs, Moore joined the chemistry faculty at the University of Michigan in Ann Arbor, Michigan in 1990.

In 1993 Moore returned to the University of Illinois as one of the chemistry faculty. He is currently a professor of materials science and engineering, and holds the title of Murchison-Mallory Chair in the department of chemistry. He is a member of the Materials Research Laboratory, and in 1994, he became a part-time faculty member at the Beckman Institute for Advanced Science and Technology, both at the University of Illinois. He is a member of the Autonomous Materials Systems Group, and has served as co-chair of the Institute's Molecular and Electronic Nanostructures theme.

As a teacher, Moore has developed innovative approaches to large enrollment courses in organic chemistry at the university, integrating online resources, webcasts, and Web-based conferencing to encourage curiosity-driven learning, student participation, autonomy, and problem solving. Moore has served as Faculty Advisor to the University of Illinois' Society of Postdoctoral Scholars since January 2011. He is credited with "changing the national conversation about how students should learn and about what constitutes an optimum educational environment."

He restructured his course so that he could incorporate challenging, open-ended problems that students work through together, with coaching from Moore and other mentors. ... As they attack complex, real-world problems, students learn to take calculated risks, work through uncertainty, and persevere despite setbacks.

Moore served as interim head of the department of chemistry at the University of Illinois from 2012-2013. He was named a Howard Hughes Medical Institute Professor in 2014. He became the director of the Beckman Institute for Advanced Science and Technology in May 2017, after having served as Interim Director since April 2016. Moore replaced Arthur F. Kramer, who became the new senior vice provost for research at Northeastern University.

== Research ==
Drawing upon physical organic chemistry and materials science, Moore's group of researchers at the University of Illinois studies the synthesis of large organic molecules and seeks to discover new polymers. Some of Moore's early work utilized the phenylacetylene moiety in the construction of nanoscale structures such as macrocycles and dendrimers. He has extensively studied macromolecular architectures, the molecular construction of structures such as foldamers, and the synthesis of shape-persistent macrocycles.

Understanding the ways in which polymers undergo chemical reactions and produce chemical signals has made it possible to design polymers that can respond to mechanical activation. One of Moore's goals is to engineer mechanically responsive materials that will be safer and last longer than current materials. Working with colleagues such as Nancy Sottos and Scott R. White, he has developed self-healing polymeric materials. Moore has shown that microencapsulated healing agents can polymerize to heal areas of damage such as cracks smaller than a human hair.

Responsive materials can also be designed to change in response to indicators such as high stress, to signal that problems such as cracks are in danger of developing. Moore's team has developed sensors that can detect and respond to mechanical force. For example, a molecular probe can undergo a color change to signal possible damage. In 2005, Moore, Jennifer A. Lewis and others demonstrated a light-sensitive monolayer that could be used to design colloidal fluids, gels and crystals whose surface charge and chemical structure would change depending on their exposure to ultraviolet light. More recently Moore and others have created heat-sensitive microspheres that react to conditions such as thermal runaway in lithium-ion batteries.

Moore, Sottos and White have demonstrated a novel mechanochemical approach to the manipulation of matter by using mechanical force to bias reaction pathways and prioritize certain chemical transformations over others in chemical reactions. This approach enables scientists to create products that would be impossible to obtain under conventional conditions.

As of 2014, Moore's team demonstrated a two-stage process that would enable larger areas of damage, on the order of a bullet hole, to be regenerated. The responsive material initially creates a scaffold which is then filled in through secondary chemical reactions.

Moore has been a principal investigator (PI) or co-PI for a number of federal and corporate grants, often working with colleagues across disciplines. In 2007, as PI of "Mechanochemically-Active Polymer Composites", he was one of the winners of a Multi-University Research Initiative (MURI) grant competition from the Department of Defense.

As of 2012, Moore became the lead investigator for a multi-institutional project working with the Department of Energy (DOE) Joint Center for Energy Storage Research (JCESR) on batteries and energy storage. The Argonne National Laboratory will collaborate with universities and private firms to develop next-generation battery and energy storage technologies, suitable for use in electric and hybrid cars and for storage in the electricity grid. Moore's group is studying redox-active molecules and macromolecules so as to develop macromolecular designs for non-aqueous redox flow battery systems.

Jeffrey S. Moore has published over 300 articles in journals such as Macromolecules, the Journal of Chemical Education, Advanced Materials and the Journal of Materials Chemistry. He served as an associate editor for the Journal of the American Chemical Society from July 1999 to 2013.

== Awards and honors ==
He has been elected as a Fellow of the National Academy of Sciences, Royal Society of Chemistry, the American Association for the Advancement of Science, and the American Academy of Arts and Sciences (2008). He is a Fellow of the American Chemical Society (ACS, 2010) and of the division of Polymeric Materials: Science and Engineering (PMSE) of the ACS (2010).

His awards include an Alfred P. Sloan Fellowship (1997), an Arthur C. Cope Scholar Award (1996), and an NSF Young Investigator Award (1992).

In 2014, Moore was named a Howard Hughes Medical Institute Professor. In 2015 he received a Leete Award from the American Chemical Society Division of Organic Chemistry for "outstanding contributions to teaching and research in organic chemistry".

Moore has received the Campus Award for Excellence in Undergraduate Teaching, the Liberal Arts & Sciences Dean's Award for Excellence in Undergraduate Teaching, and a Dreyfus Teacher-Scholar Award (1994). He is one of Illinois' "Faculty Ranked Excellent by their Students".

== Selected bibliography ==
=== Self-healing materials ===
- White, S. R.; Sottos, N. R.; Geubelle, P. H.; Moore, J. S.; Kessler, M. R.; Sriram, S. R.; Brown, E. N.; Viswanathan, S. (15 February 2001). "Autonomic healing of polymer composites". Nature. 409 (6822): 794–797. Bibcode:2001Natur.409..794S. doi:10.1038/35057232. PMID 11236987. S2CID 11334883.
- Toohey, Kathleen S.; Sottos, Nancy R.; Lewis, Jennifer A.; Moore, Jeffrey S.; White, Scott R. (10 June 2007). "Self-healing materials with microvascular networks". Nature Materials. 6 (8): 581–585. Bibcode:2007NatMa...6..581T. doi:10.1038/nmat1934. PMID 17558429.
- Caruso, Mary M.; Blaiszik, Benjamin J.; White, Scott R.; Sottos, Nancy R.; Moore, Jeffrey S. (9 July 2008). "Full Recovery of Fracture Toughness Using a Nontoxic Solvent-Based Self-Healing System" (PDF). Advanced Functional Materials. 18 (13): 1898–1904. doi:10.1002/adfm.200800300. S2CID 6294704.
- Wilson, Gerald O.; Henderson, James W.; Caruso, Mary M.; Blaiszik, Benjamin J.; McIntire, Patrick J.; Sottos, Nancy R.; White, Scott R.; Moore, Jeffrey S. (15 June 2010). "Evaluation of peroxide initiators for radical polymerization-based self-healing applications" (PDF). Journal of Polymer Science Part A: Polymer Chemistry. 48 (12): 2698–2708. Bibcode:2010JPoSA..48.2698W. doi:10.1002/pola.24053.
- Esser-Kahn, Aaron P.; Thakre, Piyush R.; Dong, Hefei; Patrick, Jason F.; Vlasko-Vlasov, Vitalii K.; Sottos, Nancy R.; Moore, Jeffrey S.; White, Scott R. (23 August 2011). "Three-Dimensional Microvascular Fiber-Reinforced Composites" (PDF). Advanced Materials. 23 (32): 3654–3658. Bibcode:2011AdM....23.3654E. doi:10.1002/adma.201100933. PMID 21766345. S2CID 46096597.
- White, S. R.; Moore, J. S.; Sottos, N. R.; Krull, B. P.; Santa Cruz, W. A.; Gergely, R. C. R. (8 May 2014). "Restoration of Large Damage Volumes in Polymers". Science. 344 (6184): 620–623. Bibcode:2014Sci...344..620W. doi:10.1126/science.1251135. PMID 24812399. S2CID 17183100.

=== Mechanochemistry ===
- Hickenboth, Charles R.; Moore, Jeffrey S.; White, Scott R.; Sottos, Nancy R.; Baudry, Jerome; Wilson, Scott R. (22 March 2007). "Biasing reaction pathways with mechanical force". Nature. 446 (7134): 423–427. Bibcode:2007Natur.446..423H. doi:10.1038/nature05681. PMID 17377579. S2CID 4427747.
- Davis, Douglas A.; Hamilton, Andrew; Yang, Jinglei; Cremar, Lee D.; Van Gough, Dara; Potisek, Stephanie L.; Ong, Mitchell T.; Braun, Paul V.; Martínez, Todd J.; White, Scott R.; Moore, Jeffrey S.; Sottos, Nancy R. (7 May 2009). "Force-induced activation of covalent bonds in mechanoresponsive polymeric materials". Nature. 459 (7243): 68–72. Bibcode:2009Natur.459...68D. doi:10.1038/nature07970. PMID 19424152. S2CID 4389176.
- Caruso, Mary M.; Davis, Douglas A.; Shen, Qilong; Odom, Susan A.; Sottos, Nancy R.; White, Scott R.; Moore, Jeffrey S. (11 November 2009). "Mechanically-Induced Chemical Changes in Polymeric Materials" (PDF). Chemical Reviews. 109 (11): 5755–5798. doi:10.1021/cr9001353. PMID 19827748.
- Lee, Corissa K.; Davis, Douglas A.; White, Scott R.; Moore, Jeffrey S.; Sottos, Nancy R.; Braun, Paul V. (17 November 2010). "Force-Induced Redistribution of a Chemical Equilibrium" (PDF). Journal of the American Chemical Society. 132 (45): 16107–16111. Bibcode:2010JAChS.13216107L. doi:10.1021/ja106332g. PMID 20977210.
- Kryger, Matthew J.; Munaretto, Alexander M.; Moore, Jeffrey S. (23 November 2011). "Structure–Mechanochemical Activity Relationships for Cyclobutane Mechanophores". Journal of the American Chemical Society. 133 (46): 18992–18998. Bibcode:2011JAChS.13318992K. doi:10.1021/ja2086728. PMID 22032443.
- Diesendruck, Charles E.; Steinberg, Brian D.; Sugai, Naoto; Silberstein, Meredith N.; Sottos, Nancy R.; White, Scott R.; Braun, Paul V.; Moore, Jeffrey S. (August 2012). "Proton-Coupled Mechanochemical Transduction: A Mechanogenerated Acid" (PDF). Journal of the American Chemical Society. 134 (30): 12446–12449. Bibcode:2012JAChS.13412446D. CiteSeerX 10.1.1.660.1536. doi:10.1021/ja305645x. PMID 22775564.
- Robb, Maxwell J.; Moore, Jeffrey S. (21 August 2015). "A Retro-Staudinger Cycloaddition: Mechanochemical Cycloelimination of a β-Lactam Mechanophore" (PDF). Journal of the American Chemical Society. 137 (34): 10946–10949. Bibcode:2015JAChS.13710946R. doi:10.1021/jacs.5b07345. PMID 26295609. S2CID 207158541.

=== Macromolecular architectures ===
- Ghosh, Koushik; Moore, Jeffrey S. (14 December 2011). "Foldamer Structuring by Covalently Bound Macromolecules". Journal of the American Chemical Society. 133 (49): 19650–19652. Bibcode:2011JAChS.13319650G. doi:10.1021/ja2087163. PMID 22085331.
- Finke, Aaron D.; Gross, Dustin E.; Han, Amy; Moore, Jeffrey S. (7 September 2011). "Engineering Solid-State Morphologies in Carbazole–Ethynylene Macrocycles". Journal of the American Chemical Society. 133 (35): 14063–14070. Bibcode:2011JAChS.13314063F. doi:10.1021/ja204795q. PMID 21774541.
- Elliott, Erin L.; Hartley, C. Scott; Moore, Jeffrey S. (2011). "Covalent ladder formation becomes kinetically trapped beyond four rungs". Chemical Communications. 47 (17): 5028–30. doi:10.1039/C1CC11242B. PMID 21445418. S2CID 37185809.
- Gross, Dustin E.; Moore, Jeffrey S. (24 May 2011). "Arylene–Ethynylene Macrocycles via Depolymerization–Macrocyclization". Macromolecules. 44 (10): 3685–3687. Bibcode:2011MaMol..44.3685G. doi:10.1021/ma2006552.
- Sisco, Scott W.; Moore, Jeffrey S. (6 June 2012). "Directional Cyclooligomers via Alkyne Metathesis". Journal of the American Chemical Society. 134 (22): 9114–9117. Bibcode:2012JAChS.134.9114S. doi:10.1021/ja303572k. PMID 22594936.

=== Energy storage materials ===
- Blaiszik, Benjamin J.; Kramer, Sharlotte L. B.; Grady, Martha E.; McIlroy, David A.; Moore, Jeffrey S.; Sottos, Nancy R.; White, Scott R. (17 January 2012). "Autonomic Restoration of Electrical Conductivity" (PDF). Advanced Materials. 24 (3): 398–401. Bibcode:2012AdM....24..398B. doi:10.1002/adma.201102888. PMID 22183927. S2CID 2225085.
- Esser-Kahn, Aaron P.; Sottos, Nancy R.; White, Scott R.; Moore, Jeffrey S. (4 August 2010). "Programmable Microcapsules from Self-Immolative Polymers" (PDF). Journal of the American Chemical Society. 132 (30): 10266–10268. Bibcode:2010JAChS.13210266E. doi:10.1021/ja104812p. PMID 20662509.
- Odom, Susan A.; Tyler, Timothy P.; Caruso, Mary M.; Ritchey, Joshua A.; Schulmerich, Matthew V.; Robinson, Scott J.; Bhargava, Rohit; Sottos, Nancy R.; White, Scott R.; Hersam, Mark C.; Moore, Jeffrey S. (2012). "Autonomic restoration of electrical conductivity using polymer-stabilized carbon nanotube and graphene microcapsules" (PDF). Applied Physics Letters. 101 (4): 043106. Bibcode:2012ApPhL.101d3106O. doi:10.1063/1.4737935.
- Odom, Susan A.; Chayanupatkul, Sarut; Blaiszik, Benjamin J.; Zhao, Ou; Jackson, Aaron C.; Braun, Paul V.; Sottos, Nancy R.; White, Scott R.; Moore, Jeffrey S. (15 May 2012). "A Self-healing Conductive Ink" (PDF). Advanced Materials. 24 (19): 2578–2581. Bibcode:2012AdM....24.2578O. doi:10.1002/adma.201200196. PMID 22488916. S2CID 8496508.
- Baginska, Marta; Blaiszik, Benjamin J.; Merriman, Ryan J.; Sottos, Nancy R.; Moore, Jeffrey S.; White, Scott R. (May 2012). "Autonomic Shutdown of Lithium-Ion Batteries Using Thermoresponsive Microspheres" (PDF). Advanced Energy Materials. 2 (5): 583–590. Bibcode:2012AdEnM...2..583B. doi:10.1002/aenm.201100683. S2CID 17613130.
- Blaiszik, Benjamin J.; Kramer, Sharlotte L. B.; Grady, Martha E.; McIlroy, David A.; Moore, Jeffrey S.; Sottos, Nancy R.; White, Scott R. (17 January 2012). "Autonomic Restoration of Electrical Conductivity" (PDF). Advanced Materials. 24 (3): 398–401. Bibcode:2012AdM....24..398B. doi:10.1002/adma.201102888. PMID 22183927. S2CID 2225085.
