= Carl R. Woese Institute for Genomic Biology =

Genomics research facility at University of Illinois Urbana-Champaign

Coordinates: 40.104728°N 88.225011°W

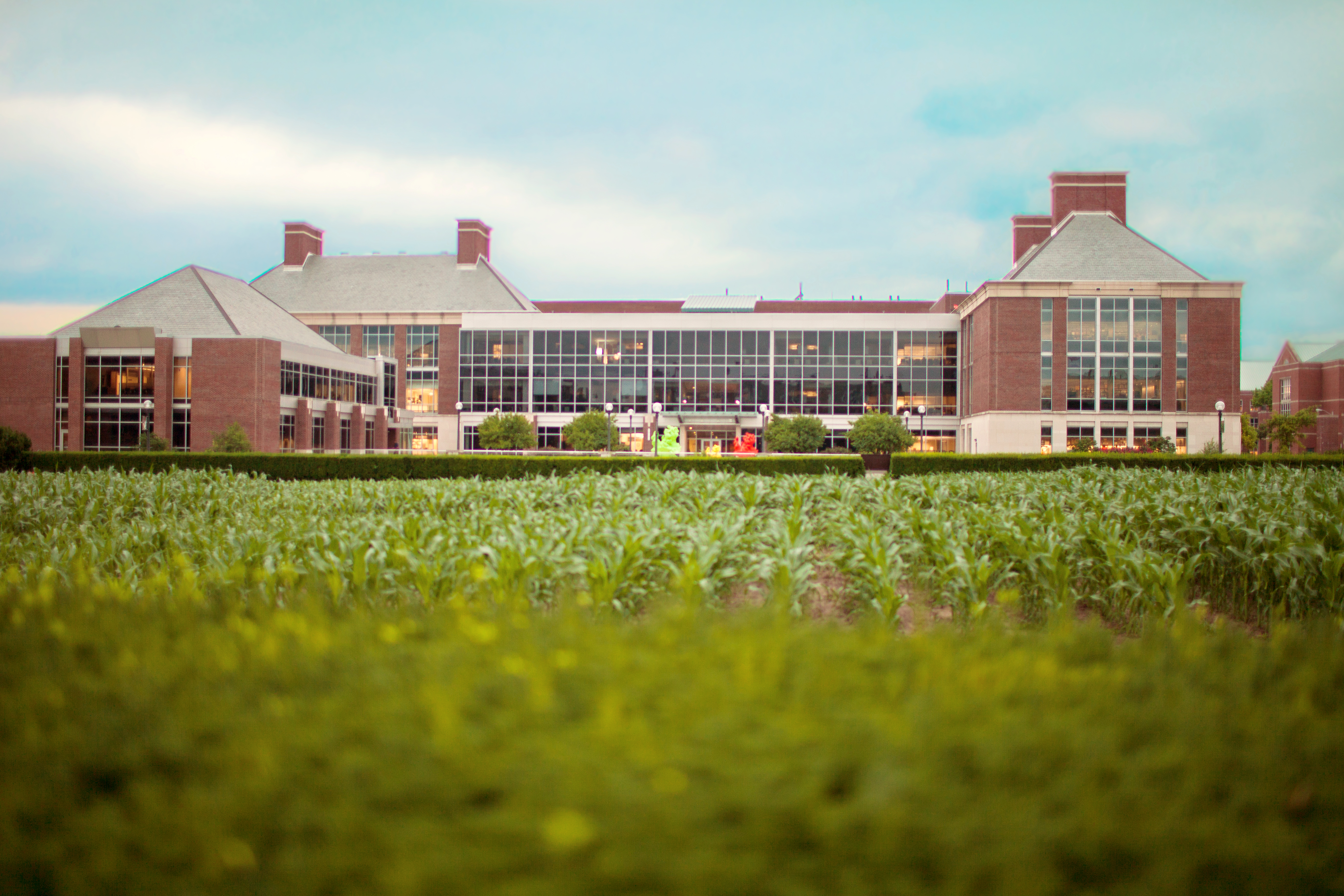
- The Carl R. Woese Institute for Genomic Biology, with the Morrow Plots in the foreground
- Established: 2006
- Mission: To advance life sciences research and stimulate bioeconomic development.
- Focus: Research in systems biology, cellular and metabolic engineering and genome technology.
- Director: Gene E. Robinson
- Address: 1206 W Gregory Drive
- Location: Urbana, Illinois, United States of America
- Website: http://www.igb.illinois.edu/

The Carl R. Woese Institute for Genomic Biology (IGB) is an interdisciplinary facility for genomics research at the University of Illinois Urbana-Champaign. The Institute was built in 2006 to centralize biotechnology research at the University of Illinois. Current research at the IGB explores the genomic bases of a wide range of phenomena, including the progression of cancer, the ecological impact of global change, tissue and organ growth, and the diversity of animal behavior.

== History ==
=== Construction ===
Plans for what would become the Carl R. Woese Institute for Genomic Biology (IGB) were formed in the late 1990s. In 2000, $67.5 million was appropriated by the state of Illinois for its construction. Due to economic hardships, the state halted plans for construction in 2001. In 2002, funds were re-appropriated. Construction began in April 2004 and was completed in November 2006. The building was dedicated in March 2007. Initially named the Institute for Genomic Biology, it officially changed its name to the Carl R. Woese Institute for Genomic Biology in 2015 to honor the scientific contributions of Carl R. Woese.

=== Leadership ===
The IGB was initially led by Harris Lewin, then a professor in the Department of Animal Sciences at the University of Illinois. Lewin served as the founding director until 2011, when he accepted the position of Research Vice Chancellor at University of California, Davis. Gene E. Robinson, a professor in the Entomology department, took over as Interim Director, and was named the new Director of IGB in January 2012.

== Research ==
The IGB houses approximately 130 faculty and 600 graduate students, postdoctoral fellows, and research personnel. Research is organized into themes, they are reviewed every five years; new themes may be added or existing themes modified to reflect the current state of genomics research. Current themes are listed below:

Research themes and Initiatives at the Carl R. Woese Institute for Genomic Biology
Theme	Theme Leader	Description of Research
Anticancer Discovery from Pets to People (ACPP)	Paul Hergenrother	Develops cancer treatments in pet animals that translate to human disease.
Biosystems Design (BSD)	Huimin Zhao	Engineers microorganisms and plants to address challenges in health and sustainability.
Center for Artificial Intelligence and Modeling (CAIM)	Sergei Maslow and Olgica Milenkovic	Studies complicated scientific processes using modeling and machine learning.
Center for Genomic Diagnostics (CGD)	Brian Cunningham	Employs new technologies to diagnose and treat diseases at a lower cost.
Center for Indigenous Science (CIS)	Ripan Malhi and Jenny Davis	Uses Indigenous Science frameworks to promote research that is ethical, sustainable, and community-focused.
Crops And Microbes for BioEconomy Resilience and Sustainability (CAMBERS)	Andrew Leakey	Re-designs crops, microbes and ecosystems to produce next-generation biofuels and bioproducts.
Environmental Impact on Reproductive Health (EIRH)	Indrani Bagchi and Jodi Flaws	Focuses on the effects of environment, diet, and stress on reproductive health.
Gene Networks in Neural and Developmental Biology (GNDP)	Alison Bell	Examines the effects of coordinated gene activity on biological diversity.
Genomic Security and Privacy (GSP)	Carl Gunter	Uses new technologies to protect the privacy and security of genomic information.
Infection Genomics for One Health (IGOH)	Rachel Whitaker	Examines how microbes in human-inhabited environments influence health and disease.
Microbiome Metabolic Engineering (MME)	Michael Miller and Carin Vanderpool	Explores the relationships among human microbiota, environment, and health.
Mining for anti-infectious Molecules from Genomes (MMG)	Wilfred van der Donk	Discovers small molecules that might provide new medical solutions.
Scott H. Fisher Multi-Cellular Engineered Living Systems (M-CELS)	Hyunjoon Kong	Creates machines made of living cells.
Photosynthesis & Food Security (PFS)	Donald Ort	Develops new crops and management methods to maintain agricultural ecosystems in the face of a changing climate.
Regenerative Biology and Tissue Engineering (RBTE)	Brendan Harley	Studies the replacement or regeneration of tissues and organs.

== Notable awards and partnerships ==
In 2007, the University of Illinois, along with the University of California, formed a partnership with the energy company BP as part of a major research project to develop bioenergy sources. The University of Illinois facility is based in the IGB.

In 2011, Abbott Nutrition and the University of Illinois collaborated to establish a research center for the study of the relationship between nutrition and cognition, entitled the Center for Nutrition, Learning, and Memory (CNLM). Several campus units are currently partners of CNLM, including the IGB.

== Building ==
The IGB is located on the south side of the University of Illinois main campus at Urbana-Champaign. The building was constructed by the architecture firm CUH2A (now a part of the architecture-engineering company HDR). The exterior of the building was designed to include elements of Georgian architecture. Inside, each Research Theme has a large, open plan laboratory space and additional work rooms and office and meeting area. The building stands adjacent to the Morrow Plots.

== See also ==
- Beckman Institute for Advanced Science and Technology
- Carl Woese
- Coordinated Science Laboratory
- Gene E. Robinson
- University of Illinois at Urbana-Champaign
- Lawrence B. Schook
