= Karl Hess (scientist) =

Austrian physicist (born 1945)

- Born: 20 June 1945; Trumau, Austria
- Education: University of Vienna
- Known for: Computational electronics, solid-state physics, quantum mechanics, simulation
- Scientific career
- Workplaces: University of Illinois at Urbana–Champaign, Beckman Institute for Advanced Science and Technology

Karl Hess (born 20 June 1945 in Trumau, Austria) is the Swanlund Professor Emeritus in the Department of Electrical and Computer Engineering at the University of Illinois at Urbana–Champaign (UIUC). He helped to establish the Beckman Institute for Advanced Science and Technology at UIUC.

Hess is concerned with solid-state physics and the fundamentals of quantum mechanics. He is recognized as an expert in electron transport, semiconductor physics, supercomputing, and nanostructures. A leader in simulating the nature and movement of electrons with computer models, Hess is considered a founder of computational electronics.

Hess has been elected to many scientific associations, including both the National Academy of Engineering (2001) and the National Academy of Sciences (2003). He has served on the National Science Board (NSB).

== Career ==
Hess studied mathematics and physics at the University of Vienna in Vienna, Austria, where he received his Ph.D. in 1970 in applied physics and mathematics. He worked with Karlheinz Seeger on electron transport in semiconductors and subsequently became an assistant.

In 1973 Hess went to the University of Illinois at Urbana-Champaign (UIUC) on a Fulbright scholarship to work with John Bardeen. With Chih-Tang Sah (the co-inventor of CMOS technology), Hess worked theoretically on electron transport in transistors, to find a solution of the Boltzmann transport equation for transistors.

In 1974 Hess returned to the University of Vienna as assistant professor. In 1977 he was offered a position as a visiting associate professor which enabled him to return to UIUC. Hess worked on improving the efficiency of charge-coupled devices. He and Ben G. Streetman developed the concept of "real space transfer" to describe the performance of high-frequency transistors involving hot‐electron thermionic emission. This work was important to the development of layered semiconductor technology.

In 1980 Hess was appointed to a full professorship for electrical engineering and computer science at UIUC. He also undertook secret research at the United States Naval Research Laboratory from the 1980s onwards.

Hess chaired one of two committees established in 1983 to consider the possible formation of a multidisciplinary research facility at the University of Illinois. In the fall of 1987, William T. Greenough and Karl Hess became associate directors of the Beckman Institute for Advanced Science and Technology at UIUC. Hess later served as Co-chair of the Molecular and Electronic Nanostructures initiative at the Beckman Institute.

Hess became "a leading theoretician in the realm of semiconductor transistors". His models of the behavior of transistors and integrated circuits enabled researchers to understand how they worked at fundamental levels and find ways to improve them. His work on simulation of the behavior of electrons in semiconductors led to the full-band Monte Carlo method of simulation. This approach incorporated both the Boltzmann equation and aspects of quantum mechanics, using supercomputers to model electrons both as particles and as waves. He also developed simulations for the behavior of electrons in optoelectronics, modeling quantum well laser diodes, tiny lasers used in bar-code scanners, CD players, and fiber-optic technology. Hess's algorithms were used for design software called MINILASE, enabling engineers to more quickly and accurately predict the effects of design modifications.

From the 1990s onwards, Hess focused on nanotechnology and quantum informatics, including quantum transport in mesoscopic systems. Around 1995, a conversation with nanolithographer Joseph W. Lyding suggested to Hess that using deuterium to passivate the surfaces of integrated circuits had the potential to increase the speed or the lifetime of the circuit. Hess and Isik Kizilyalli compared the degradation of CMOS transistor wafers prepared with either deuterium or hydrogen, and found that use of deuterium substantially increased transistor lifetimes. In 1996, Hess was named to the Swanlund Chair of Electrical and Computer and Computer Engineering at the University of Illinois.

Hess has written extensively about hidden variables, a theoretical idea in quantum mechanics that has been hotly contested by many scientists since Albert Einstein and Niels Bohr. Was quantum mechanics complete as a theory, or were not-yet-understood "hidden variables" required to explain phenomena such as "spooky action at a distance"? In the 1960s, John Stewart Bell predicted that the question of hidden variables could be experimentally tested: the outcome of specific experiments based on the hypothetical Einstein–Podolsky–Rosen (EPR) paradox should differ depending on whether or not hidden variables did or did not exist. Hess and mathematician Walter Philipp controversially claim that Bell's theorem is flawed. They argue that Bell's test can be made to fail by modeling temporal information. With this addition, existing experimental findings can be explained without resorting to hidden variables or "action at a distance". Others have argued that Hess and Philipp's formulation does not depend on new time parameters, but rather on a violation of the assumption of locality required by Bell.

Hess officially retired from the University of Illinois at Urbana-Champaign in May 2004, but remains the Swanlund Professor Emeritus. After his retirement, Hess was nominated to the National Science Board (NSB) of the National Science Foundation (NSF) by President George W. Bush, serving from 2006 to 2008.

== Honors ==
- 2010, Foreign member, German Academy of Science and Engineering (acatech)
- 2006-2008, National Science Board (NSB)
- 2003, Fellow, National Academy of Sciences
- 2001, Fellow, National Academy of Engineering, "For contributions to hot electron transport and the numerical simulation of semiconductor devices."
- 1997, Fellow, American Academy of Arts and Sciences
- 1996, Swanlund Chair of Electrical and Computer and Computer Engineering
- 1995, Sarnoff Award, Institute of Electrical and Electronics Engineers (IEEE) "For contributions to high field transport and real space transfer effects in semiconductor heterolayer structures."
- 1994, Fellow, American Physical Society, "For contributions to nonlinear electronic transport in semiconductors and in quantum well heterostructures."
- 1994, Fellow, American Association for the Advancement of Science
- 1993, J. J. Ebers Award, IEEE, for "Contributions to Electronic Transport in Semiconductors and in Quantum Well Heterostructures at High Energies"

== Books published ==
- Hess, K.; Leburton, J.P.; Ravaioli, U. (1991). Computational electronics : semiconductor transport and device simulation. Boston: Kluwer Academic Publishers. ISBN 9780792390886.
- Hess, Karl (1991). Monte Carlo device simulation : full band and beyond. Boston, MA: Springer US. ISBN 978-1461540267.
- Hess, Karl (1995). Community technology. Port Townsend, WA: Loompanics Unlimited. ISBN 9781559501347.
- Hess, Karl; Leburton, Jean-Pierre; Ravaioli, Umberto (1996). Hot Carriers in Semiconductors. Boston, MA: Springer US. ISBN 978-1-4613-0401-2.
- Hess, Karl (2000). Advanced theory of semiconductor devices. New York, NY: IEEE Press. ISBN 978-0780334793.
- Hess, Karl (2013). Working knowledge STEM essentials for the 21st century. New York: Springer. ISBN 978-1-4614-3275-3.
- Hess, Karl (2014). Einstein was right!. [S.l.]: Pan Stanford Publishing. ISBN 978-9814463690.
