= Minh Do =

Professor at University of Illinois

Minh N. Do (born 1974) is a Professor in the Department of Electrical and Computer Engineering of the University of Illinois at Urbana–Champaign in Urbana, Illinois. He also holds positions at the Coordinated Science Laboratory, the Beckman Institute for Advanced Science and Technology, the Advanced Digital Sciences Center, and the Department of Bioengineering.

== Education and career ==
Do was born in Thanh Hóa, Vietnam. In the 1990s, he immigrated to Australia and attended the University of Canberra there, graduating with a Bachelor of Engineering degree in Computer Engineering in 1997. He then flew to Switzerland, where in 2001, he got his Doctor of Science degree in Communication Systems from the École Polytechnique Fédérale de Lausanne.

== Recognitions ==
In 1991, Do was a silver medallist of the International Mathematical Olympiad and in 1997 he was awarded a University Medal from the University of Canberra. He was named Fellow of the Institute of Electrical and Electronics Engineers (IEEE) in 2014 for contributions to image representation and computational imaging.
