= Arthur F. Kramer =

American cognitive scientist

- Born: United States
- Spouse: Laurie Kramer
- Scientific career
- Fields: Psychology, cognitive neuroscience, Aging
- Workplaces: Beckman Institute for Advanced Science and Technology; Northeastern University

Arthur F. Kramer is a research scientist and an academic administrator with a focus on the disciplines of cognitive science and brain health. The majority of his career has been spent at the Beckman Institute for Advanced Science and Technology, which he helped to establish at the University of Illinois Urbana-Champaign in 1989. As of May 2016, Kramer became senior vice provost for research and graduate education at Northeastern University in Boston, Massachusetts. Arthur Kramer founded the Center for Cognitive & Brain Health at Northeastern University in 2016. He ran the research center until mid-year 2025.

== Education ==
Kramer studied at the State University of New York at Stony Brook. There he met his future wife, Laurie, and earned his B.A.

He joined the University of Illinois Urbana-Champaign as a graduate student in 1979, receiving his Ph.D. in cognitive and experimental psychology in 1984.

== Career ==
Kramer accepted an assistant professorship at the University of Illinois Urbana-Champaign in 1984, working with the departments of psychology, mechanical and industrial engineering, the campus Neuroscience program, and the Institute of Aviation. He helped to create the Beckman Institute for Advanced Science and Technology, which opened in 1989, and became the group coordinator of its Human Perception and Performance Unit. He has served as co-director of the University of Illinois's Center for Healthy Minds, co-chaired the Beckman Institute's intelligent human-computer interaction group, and directed its biomedical imaging center. He was named to the Swanlund Endowed Chair in Psychology in 2007. He became director of the Beckman Institute in 2010 which he ran until the summer of 2016.

In 2010, he was awarded a Senior Fellowship of the Zukunftskollegs at the University of Konstanz.

As of May 2016, Arthur Kramer became senior vice provost for research and graduate education at Northeastern University in Boston, Massachusetts, where he helped to develop a number of novel interdisciplinary research centers.

Kramer is a fellow of the American Psychological Association, the American Association for the Advancement of Science, the American Psychological Society, and the International Society of Attention and Performance. He has been on the editorial boards of a number of scientific publications including Perception and Psychophysics, Psychology & Aging, Human Factors, Acta Psychologia and other journals.

== Research ==
External videos
- "Boosting Cognition and Brain Function", Arthur Kramer, 2012, Technion Workshop
- "Exercise and the Brain", Edward McAuley and Arthur Kramer, Beckman Institute

Kramer studies cognitive ability, and the brain structures and functions that support it across the human lifespan. He is particularly interested in neural plasticity, the brain's ability to continue to grow and function effectively throughout life. Kramer and his colleagues are credited with shaping the field of physical activity and brain health. In 1999, in a randomized controlled design, they showed that older adults who participated in a 6-month period of aerobic training by walking showed a decreased response time to a stimulus compared to a group who did nonaerobic activities focused on flexibility. Since then, Kramer has carried out studies of cognitive control of different types, that show that physical activity combats cognitive aging. They also suggest that the benefits of aerobic training are greater for tasks requiring cognitive control, and for attention, processing speed, memory.

Structurally, Kramer's research suggests that exercise is related to changes in both cortical gray and white matter. In children and older adults who exercise, the brain's white matter is denser and more fibrous. White matter carries signals between regions of the brain, and its compactness is linked to faster nerve activity. It generally deteriorates with age. Moreover, exercise, even in older adults, has been shown to increase white matter.

Kramer has also been a lead investigator on studies of the relationships between brain structure and function and fluid intelligence. N-acetyl aspartate (NAA) has been identified as a biochemical marker of neural energy production and efficiency. Kramer has used magnetic resonance spectroscopy to measure NAA in areas of the brain, and relate them to measures of fluid intelligence for various skills. The concentration of NAA in areas associated with motor abilities was found to be related to measures of fluid intelligence related to visualization and planning.

Kramer has also been involved in research on human processing of information in response to the visual environment, examining eye movements, attention, memory, and other issues related to visual search. This research has used specially-created environments at the Beckman Institute, such as its driving simulator and its six-sided CUBE. He has also been involved in a project to bring citizen scientists into the lab.

== Awards ==
- 2025, Fellow, American Association for the Advancement of Science (AAAS)
- 2017, Honorary Doctor of Science, Stony Brook University, Stony Brook, New York
- 2005-2017, NIH Ten Year MERIT Award from the National Institute on Aging
- 2008-2011, Zukunftskolleg Senior Fellow, University of Konstanz.
- 2007-2016, Swanlund Endowed Chair in Neuroscience and Psychology, University of Illinois Urbana-Champaign
- 2007-2013, Multi-University Research Initiative (MURI) Award, Office of Naval Research
- 2005-2008, Richard and Margaret Romano Professional Scholar, University of Illinois Urbana-Champaign.
- 2002, Herbert A. deVries Distinguished Research Award, Council on Aging and Adult Development (with Carl W. Cotman)

== In popular culture ==
- Mention of exercise and brain aging research on Saturday Night Live, February 21, 2004
