= Ana Jonas =

American biochemist (1943–2024)

- Born: Ana Masiulis; 24 November 1943; Rokiškis, Lithuania
- Died: 12 June 2024 (aged 80); Alaska, U.S.
- Occupations: Biochemist, medical researcher, college professor
- Spouse: Jiri Jonas

Ana Masiulis Jonas (November 24, 1943 – June 12, 2024) was an American biochemist born in Lithuania. She was on the faculty of the University of Illinois Urbana-Champaign (UIUC) from 1974 until 2001. Her research "advanced our understanding of the role lipoproteins play in cardiovascular disease".

== Early life and education ==
Ana Masiulis was born in Rokiškis, Lithuania. She was a refugee in Germany as a baby, and was raised in Argentina. She moved to the United States in 1962, with her family. She graduated from the University of Illinois Chicago in 1966, and completed doctoral studies in biochemistry at the University of Illinois Urbana-Champaign (UIUC) in 1970. Her doctoral dissertation was titled "Physicochemical Studies on the Tertiary Structure of Bovine Serum Albumin." She was granted United States citizenship in 1967.

== Career ==
Jonas joined the faculty of UIUC in 1974, started her own laboratory in 1977, and achieved full professor status in 1985. She and her colleague Charles Matz developed a technique for generating reconstituted HDL, which was used in laboratories for decades afterward. She studied the structure of apolipoprotein A1, and its role in cardiovascular health. She also studied the enzyme lecithin–cholesterol acyltransferase (LCAT).

Jonas chaired the Gordon Research Conference on Lipid Metabolism in 1990. She received the Lyman Duff Lectureship Award from the American Heart Association. In 2024, she received the Jack Oram Lifetime Achievement Award for HDL Research.

== Publications ==
- "Micellar complexes of human apolipoprotein A-I with phosphatidylcholines and cholesterol prepared from cholate-lipid dispersions" (1982, with C. E. Matz)
- "Discoidal complexes of A and C apolipoproteins with lipids and their reactions with lecithin: cholesterol acyltransferase" (1984, with S. A. Sweeny and P. N. Herbert)
- "Defined apolipoprotein AI conformations in reconstituted high density lipoprotein discs" (1989, with K. E. Kézdy and J. H. Wald)
- "NMR Study of the Cold, Heat, and Pressure Unfolding of Ribonuclease A" (1995, with Jing Zhang, Xiangdong Peng, and Jiri Jonas)
- "The role of apolipoprotein AI domains in lipid binding" (1996, with W. Sean Davidson, Theodore Hazlett, and William W. Mantulin)
- "Predicting the structure of apolipoprotein A-I in reconstituted high-density lipoprotein disks" (1997, with J. C. Phillips, W. Wriggers, Z. Li, and K. Schulten)
- "Regulation of lecithin cholesterol acyltransferase activity" (1998)
- "Stabilization of α-Synuclein Secondary Structure upon Binding to Synthetic Membranes" (1998, with W. Sean Davidson, David F. Clayton, and Julia M. George)

== Personal life ==
Ana Masiulis married Czech-born chemist Jiri Jonas in 1968. The Jonases retired to Naples, Florida, in 2001. She died in 2024, at the age of 79, while vacationing in Alaska.
