= Jerson Lima =

Brazilian biophysicist

- Born: 29 February 1960 (age 66); Rio de Janeiro, Brazil
- Education: Federal University of Rio de Janeiro
- Known for: Protein folding Fluorescence spectroscopy techniques Nuclear magnetic resonance
- Scientific career
- Fields: Biophysicist

Jerson Lima da Silva (born 29 February 1960), usually known as Jerson Lima, is a Brazilian biophysicist. He is known for his pioneering research in the field of structural biology, publishing important studies on protein folding and the relationship between protein aggregates and diseases such as cancer, prion diseases and Parkinson's disease.

== Personal life ==
The son of a Brazilian navy sergeant and a housewife who sold homemade sweets, Jerson Lima grew up in the suburbs of Rio de Janeiro. He was first introduced to the scientific method during high school, when he studied at the Federal Technical School of Chemistry in Rio de Janeiro (ETFQ-RJ), which has been renamed the Federal Institute of Rio de Janeiro.

He is married to UFRJ researcher and professor Debora Foguel. They have four children.

== Education and scientific career ==
In 1984, Lima graduated from the Federal University of Rio de Janeiro (UFRJ) with a Doctor of Medicine degree. He began his scientific career while still an undergraduate, joining a laboratory team led by Professor Sergio Verjovski Almeida in the Department of Medical Biochemistry and directed by physician and researcher Leopoldo de Meis. There, he conducted studies on the structure and function of calcium-transporting proteins in the sarcoplasmic reticulum of muscle cells.

In 1987, Jerson completed his PhD in biophysics at the Carlos Chagas Filho Institute of Biophysics at UFRJ, under the advisory of Verjovski Almeida. He focused his research on oligomeric proteins and icosahedral viruses, adopting several different methods of fluorescence spectroscopy in his studies.

Due to his experience in adopting fluorescence techniques, Jerson also obtained a postdoctoral position shortly after graduation from UFRJ in Gregorio Weber's laboratory at the University of Illinois, where he stayed from 1985 to 1986. Between 1991 and 1992, he returned to Weber's laboratory, this time as a visiting researcher and fellow at the Guggenheim Foundation. While studying with Weber, he deepened his knowledge of proteins, studying protein plasticity, supramolecular structures, and the physiological effects of proteins. He also perfected techniques for advanced fluorescence and nuclear magnetic resonance of proteins subjected to pressure in collaboration with Professor Jiri Jonas.

== Scientific contributions ==
Lima has made several scientific contributions to the areas of biochemistry and structural biology as a pioneer in the study of the prion-like and amyloidogenic behavior of the p53 protein and its relationship with different types of cancer. His work has led to advances in the understanding of protein folding, virus assembly, and the mechanisms responsible for the formation of protein aggregates and misfolding. His research specifically showed how these last two are responsible for the pathophysiology of several diseases including different types of cancer, prion diseases (such as the bovine spongiform encephalopathy, also known as Mad Cow disease and Creutzfeldt-Jakob disease), and Parkinson's disease.

== Academic management and leadership ==
Throughout his scientific career, Lima has performed in several academic management roles and integrated important scientific associations and institutions.

He has been a professor at the Institute of Medical Biochemistry Leopoldo de Meis (IBqM) at UFRJ since 1988. He has been a full member of the Brazilian Academy of Sciences (ABC) since 1998 and served on the institution's board of directors from 2007 to 2010. He has been a member of the World Academy of Sciences for the Advancement of Science in Developing Countries since 2006, and of the Brazilian National Academy of Medicine (in the Section of Applied Sciences to Medicine) since 2011, when he became one of the youngest full members of the centennial Academy.

In the 1990s, he helped coordinate the founding of the Jiri Jonas Nuclear Magnetic Resonance Center (CNRMN), where he is now director emeritus. The center was inaugurated in the city of Rio de Janeiro in 1999. CNRMN was the first research center in Brazil to make NMR structures of macromolecules and today is part of CENABIO, the largest NMR center in Latin America. Between 2005 and 2008, he coordinated the Millennium Institute of Structural Biology in Biomedicine and Biotechnology (IMBEBB) and has been Coordinator of the National Institute of Science and Technology in Structural Biology and Bioimaging (INBEB) since 2008, having participated in the creation of both institutes. From 2008 to 2012, he served as president of the Brazilian Society of Biophysics (SBBF). He has also served, from 2014 to 2016, as president of the Brazilian Society of Biochemistry and Molecular Biology (SBBQ). In 2019, he became president of the Carlos Chagas Filho Foundation for Research Support of the State of Rio de Janeiro (FAPERJ), his current position, having served as scientific director of the foundation from 2003 to 2018.

== Awards and honors ==
For his contributions to science, Lima has been awarded numerous prizes and honors including:

- John Simon Guggenheim Foundation (1991)
- Howard Hughes Medical Institute (1997-2002)
- National Order of Scientific Merit by the Presidency of the Republic of Brazil, in the class of Commander (2002) and Great Cross (2009)
- The World Academy of Sciences Prize in Biology (2005)
- Gregorio Weber Award for Excellence in Fluorescence Theory and Applications, from the American Biophysical Society (2018)
