= Pavlovian Society =

Learned society

- Named after: Ivan Pavlov
- Formation: May 7, 1955; 71 years ago
- Founder: W. Horsley Gantt
- Founded at: Johns Hopkins School of Medicine, Baltimore, Maryland
- Type: Learned society
- Purpose: Research
- Fields: Psychology
- President: Mihaela Iordanova
- Website: pavlovian.org

The Pavlovian Society, also known as the Pavlovian Society of North America, is a learned society dedicated to advancing Pavlovian psychological research, and to promoting the exchange of ideas between scientific disciplines.

== History ==
The Pavlovian Society was established in 1955 by W. Horsley Gantt, at a ceremony held to commemorate the 25th anniversary of the founding of his Pavlovian Laboratory at Johns Hopkins School of Medicine in Baltimore, Maryland. On May 7, 1955, at the conclusion of the 25th anniversary ceremony, the Society's first meeting was held. The meeting was attended by Gantt, Howard Liddell, Edward Kempf, David Rioch, and William G. Reese. The agreement reached at that meeting was for the society's membership to be initially limited to thirty-five people. Early in its history, the Pavlovian Society held its annual meetings in or near Baltimore and/or New York City, but this began to change as the society began to attract more members from other countries. John J. Furedy, a former president of the society, claimed that it was unique among psychological learned societies in being truly open to "genuine debate and discussion", which he argued was representative of a pre-Socratic philosophy.

== Presidents ==
Gantt was the founding president of the Pavlovian Society, serving from 1955 to 1965. Other people who have served as president of the society since then include Stephen Maren, Michael Fanselow, Richard F. Thompson, and B. F. Skinner. The current president is Mihaela Iordanova from the Center for Studies in Behavioural Neurobiology at Concordia University, Montreal.
