= J. Kathryn Bock =

American psychologist

- Education: Bucknell University; University of Illinois at Urbana-Champaign
- Known for: Structural priming
- Scientific career
- Fields: Psychology; Linguistics
- Workplaces: Beckman Institute for Advanced Science and Technology; University of Illinois at Urbana-Champaign

J. Kathryn Bock is currently professor of psychology and linguistics at the University of Illinois at Urbana-Champaign in Champaign, Illinois, where she conducts research in the Language Production Laboratory at the Beckman Institute for Advanced Science and Technology in Urbana, Illinois.

Her research focuses on language production; she was instrumental in the development and explanation of structural priming. Other fields she has contributed meaningful research to include grammatical number agreement and the influences of driving on language production. Bock categorizes her current research interests into three main questions on her website. The first question concerns the type of structure used, and how the nature of thoughts dictates that. The next topic relates to word selection and ordering. The last issue deals with how errors are produced in language production.

== Education and academic career ==
Bock graduated from Bucknell University in Lewisburg, Pennsylvania with her B.A. in Psychology and Russian before moving to University of Illinois at Urbana-Champaign for her master's degree in Psychology and doctoral degree with a focus on Cognitive Psychology and minor in Linguistics. She has taught at University of Oregon in Eugene, Oregon, Michigan State University in East Lansing, Michigan, Cornell University in Ithaca, New York, and Massachusetts Institute of Technology in Cambridge, Massachusetts.

== Structural priming ==
Bock's 1986 paper introduced the phenomenon of structural priming in psychology. There are many different syntactic constructions that can be used to convey a particular meaning. For example, the following sentences all convey the same meaning: “The boy gave the girl a cookie”, “The boy gave a cookie to the girl”, and “The girl was given a cookie by the boy”, while maintaining different structural patterns. Sometimes these structures are repeated intentionally for stylistic purposes. But it has also been demonstrated that syntactic constructions can be repeated unintentionally. The “unintentional and pragmatically unmotivated tendency to repeat the general syntactic pattern of an utterance is called structural priming”. Structural priming appears to be persistent and can be explained as a type of implicit learning.

== Most cited articles ==
- Bock, J. Kathryn. "Syntactic persistence in language production." Cognitive Psychology 18 (1986): 355–387. according to Google Scholar, this paper has been cited 1079 times by July 2014.
- Bock, J. Kathryn. "Toward a cognitive psychology of syntax: Information processing contributions to sentence formulation." Psychological Review 89 (1982): 1-47. according to Google Scholar, this paper has been cited 641 times by July 2014.
