= Pierre Wiltzius =

- Born: May 13, 1952; Luxembourg
- Education: ETH Zurich
- Scientific career
- Workplaces: University of California, Santa Barbara, University of Illinois at Urbana–Champaign, Beckman Institute for Advanced Science and Technology, AT&T Bell Laboratories

Pierre Wiltzius (May 13, 1952 Luxembourg - ) is a physicist, the Executive Dean of the College of Letters and Science and Susan & Bruce Worster Dean of Science at the University of California, Santa Barbara and an Elected Fellow of the American Physical Society and of the American Association for the Advancement of Science (Engineering, 1999).

His research has varied from photonic crystals and new fabrication techniques such as multi-beam interference lithography and colloidal self-assembly, complex fluids and soft condensed matter, resulting in high citations of 1310, 771 and 537, two of them consistently published by Nature.

== Education ==
Wiltzius attended the ETH Zurich (Swiss Federal Institute of Technology) in Zurich, Switzerland. There he earned Bachelor of Science in Physics ("Diplomphysiker") as of 1976 and Doctor of Natural Science (DSc.N.) in 1981. His doctoral thesis An investigation of the fibrinogen to fibrin transition by means of light scattering was interdisciplinary, examining blood coagulation from viewpoints of both physics and medicine.

He was a postdoctoral fellow in the Physics Department at UC Santa Barbara from 1982 to 1984.

== Career ==
Wiltzius worked at AT&T Bell Laboratories (later Lucent Technologies) from 1984 to 2001, rising to the position of director of semiconductor physics research.

As of 2001, Wiltzius became Director of the Beckman Institute for Advanced Science and Technology and Professor of Materials Science and Engineering and of Physics at the University of Illinois at Urbana–Champaign, succeeding Jiri Jonas. He served as Director from 2001 to 2008.

As of 2008, Pierre Wiltzius joined the University of California, Santa Barbara, as Executive Dean of the College of Letters and Science, the Susan & Bruce Worster Dean of Science, and Professor of Physics.

== Research ==
His research interests include soft condensed matter and complex fluids including polymers, colloids, and liquid crystals. He has investigated the development of new fabrication techniques for photonic crystals including colloidal self-assembly and multi-beam interference lithography. He was also involved in developing plastic transistors on flexible substrates for various applications, including electronic paper.

== Honors ==
- 2001, Senior member of the Institute of Electrical and Electronics Engineers (IEEE)
- 2001, R&D100 Innovation Award from R&D Magazine for printed plastic display circuits, given to the Bell/Lucent Research Group, including Zhenan Bao, John A. Rogers, Pierre Wiltzius, and others.
- 1999, Fellow of the American Association for the Advancement of Science
- 1993, Fellow of the American Physical Society, "For pioneering experiments using light and neutron scattering to study dynamics of non-equilibrium macromolecular systems and binary fluids in porous media."
