= Fred R. Volkmar =

American psychiatrist and psychologist

Fred Robert Volkmar (born 1950 in Illinois) is a psychiatrist, psychologist, and the Irving B. Harris Professor of Child Psychiatry, Pediatrics, and Psychology at the Yale School of Medicine. From 2006 to 2014, he was the director of the Yale Child Study Center and the head of child psychiatry at Yale New Haven Hospital. Prior to these appointments, he was the director of the Autism Program at the Yale Child Study Center since 1983.

== Personal life and education ==
Volkmar was raised in Sorento, Illinois. He obtained a B.S. in psychology from the University of Illinois in 1972, where he worked with William Greenough on brain development. As an undergraduate, Volkmar published or collected data for seven papers; his first publication (Rearing complexity affects branching of dendrites in the visual cortex of the rat) appeared in Science and earned him the Psi Chi national prize for research. During his time at the University of Illinois, Volkmar first came into contact with autism, and at the suggestion of a professor decided to pursue child psychology.

Volkmar received an M.D. from the Stanford University School of Medicine and an M.A. in psychology. While at Stanford, Volkmar spent some time in a school for autistic children.

== Career ==
=== Medical ===
Volkmar was a resident and fellow in psychiatry at the Stanford University School of Medicine, joining Yale as a fellow for child and adolescent psychiatry in 1980. He became an assistant professor at Yale in 1982, founding the Developmental Disability Clinic in the same year. He was board certified in psychiatry and in child and adolescent psychiatry in 1988. In the same year, he was promoted to associate professor, becoming a full professor in 1998. He held the Irving B. Harris chair in 1987 and 1988, being appointed permanently in 2003.

=== Appointments ===
Volkmar was appointed director of the Yale Child Study Center in 2006, succeeding Alan E Kazdin, and served until 2014.

Volkmar was the lead author of the section on autism in the fourth revision of the Diagnostic and Statistical Manual of Mental Disorders (DSM-IV) published in 1994, which saw the introduction of Asperger syndrome as a diagnosis. He was part of the work group on neurodevelopmental disorders for the DSM-5 (2013) but resigned and, as of 2023, still believes the DSM-5 criteria are too strict, according to The Guardian.

Between 2007 and 2022, he was the editor-in-chief of the Journal of Autism and Developmental Disorders. As of 2023, Volkmar is the editor-in-chief of the Encyclopedia of Autism Spectrum Disorders since publication of its first edition in 2013. He was an editor for the Handbook of Autism and Pervasive Developmental Disorders, overseeing the publication of its second, third, and fourth edition.

== Recognition and awards ==
Volkmar received the Blanche F. Ittleson Award from the American Psychiatric Association in 1997 and, in 2007, the George Tarjan Award for Research in Developmental Disabilities from the American Academy of Child and Adolescent Psychiatry.
