= Huimin Zhao =

American chemist

- Education: University of Science and Technology of China; California Institute of Technology
- Awards: ACS Young Investigator (2008); Beckman Fellow (2006-2007) DuPont Young Investigator (2005); NSF CAREER Award (2004); Biotechnology Progress Award for Excellence in Biological Engineering Publication (2017)
- Scientific career
- Fields: Chemical Engineering
- Workplaces: University of Illinois
- Doctoral advisor: Frances H. Arnold

Huimin Zhao is the Steven L. Miller Chair Professor of Chemical and Biomolecular Engineering at the University of Illinois, Urbana-Champaign, as well as the leader of the Biosystems Design research theme in the Carl R. Woese Institute for Genomic Biology. His research focuses on directed evolution, metabolic engineering, bioinformatics and high throughput technologies.

== Early life and education ==
He received his B.S. in biology from the University of Science and Technology of China and his Ph.D. in chemistry in 1998 from the California Institute of Technology under the guidance of Frances Arnold.

== Career ==
Prior to joining the University of Illinois, Urbana-Champaign, he was a project leader at Dow Chemical. He then joined the UIUC faculty in 2000. His lab focuses on using protein engineering and metabolic engineering to harness the power of synthetic biology over four principal themes, industrial bioenergy, drug discovery and development, gene therapy, synthetic biology and immunotherapy. He is a Fellow of the American Association for the Advancement of Science and the American Institute of Medical and Biological Engineering. He serves as an associate editor of ACS Catalysis.
