= Integrative Psychological and Behavioral Science =

Academic journal

- Discipline: Psychology
- Language: English
- Edited by: Jaan Valsiner

Publication details
- Former name(s): Conditional Reflex; Pavlovian Journal of Biological Science; Integrative Physiological and Behavioral Science
- History: 1965–present
- Publisher: Springer Science+Business Media
- Frequency: Quarterly
- Impact factor: 1.295 (2017)

Standard abbreviations
- ISO 4: Integr. Psychol. Behav. Sci.

Indexing
- ISSN: 1932-4502 (print); 1936-3567 (web)
- LCCN: 2006213445
- OCLC no.: 1052655845

Links
- Journal homepage; Online archive

Integrative Psychological and Behavioral Science is a quarterly peer-reviewed scientific journal covering the integration of psychology and biology through epigenesis. It was established in 1965 by W. H. Gantt and others as Conditional Reflex; the first issue was published in 1966. In 1974 it was renamed The Pavlovian Journal of Biological Science, and it was renamed again to Integrative Physiological and Behavioral Science in 1991. The journal obtained its current name in 2007. It is published by Springer Science+Business Media and the editor-in-chief is Jaan Valsiner (Aalborg University). According to the Journal Citation Reports, the journal has a 2017 impact factor of 1.295.
