= Mary L. Kraft =

American biological engineer

- Occupation: Professor

Academic background
- Education: University of Illinois Chicago; University of Illinois Urbana-Champaign
- Thesis: Development and characterization of fatty acid-coated microgels within microfluidic systems (2003)
- Doctoral advisor: Jeffrey S. Moore

Academic work
- Discipline: Biological engineering
- Institutions: University of Illinois

Mary L. Kraft is a full professor at the department of chemical and biological engineering at the University of Illinois and is also an affiliate professor in the department of chemistry.

== Biography ==
Kraft earned her B.S. in Biochemistry from the University of Illinois Chicago in 1998 and went on to gain her Ph.D. in Chemistry from the University of Illinois Urbana-Champaign in 2003 in the lab of Jeffrey S. Moore. The title of her dissertation was "Development and characterization of fatty acid-coated microgels within microfluidic systems." She was a Postdoctoral Fellow at Stanford University before returning to work at the University of Illinois in Urbana.

Kraft's research focuses on analyzing the structure and function of cells using computational statistics and imaging techniques. She won the Walter A. Shaw Young Investigator Award in Lipid Research in 2014, which is awarded by the American Society for Biochemistry and Molecular Biology and is given to a researcher within 10 years of completing their MD or PhD. She has authored more than 90 papers.

== Awards and honors ==
- Excellence in Advising Award, College of Engineering, University of Illinois, UC, 2008
- Career Award at the Scientific Interface, Burroughs Wellcome Fund, 2007-2011
- Kirschstein Postdoctoral Fellow, National Institutes of Health, 2003-2007
- School of Chemical Sciences Excellence in Teaching, University of Illinois, 2014-2015
- American Vacuum Society (AVS) Prairie Chapter Early-Career Research Award, 2015
