= W. Horsley Gantt =

American physiologist and psychiatrist

- Born: William Andrew Horsley Gantt; October 24, 1892; Wingina, Virginia
- Died: February 26, 1980 (aged 87); Baltimore, Maryland
- Education: University of North Carolina; University of Virginia
- Known for: Classical conditioning Psychophysiology
- Spouse: Mary Gould Richardson (m. 1934–1964) Rebecca Annie Esler (m. 1965)
- Children: Andrew and Emily
- Awards: Lasker Award (1946)
- Scientific career
- Fields: Physiology; Psychology
- Institutions: Johns Hopkins University School of Medicine

William Andrew Horsley Gantt (24 October 1892 – 26 February 1980) was an American physiologist and psychiatrist. At the time of his death in 1980, he was one of only two surviving students of Russian physiologist Ivan Pavlov. He spent fifty-six years of his career extending Pavlov's seminal experimental research on classical conditioning. He is also recognized for his research in psychophysiology.

== Early life and education ==
Gantt was born on October 24, 1892, on the Rock Cliff estate in Wingina, Virginia. His father was a businessman and his mother was college-educated. Gantt's father died when he was three years old. When Gantt was twelve years old, his mother enrolled him in the Miller School in Charlottesville, Virginia, which he attended on a scholarship. In 1913, he enrolled at the University of North Carolina, from which he received his B.S. degree in 1917. He then attended the University of Virginia, from which he received his M.D. in 1920.

== Academic career ==
In 1922, Gantt began working for the American Relief Administration in Petrograd, Russia, where he studied the health effects of famine and war. In October of that year, Gantt was introduced to Ivan Pavlov by Nicholai Zelheim, one of Pavlov's Russian colleagues. Gantt then completed a one-year residency at University College Medical School, where he studied liver pathology with John William McNee. In 1925, he returned to Russia to work with Pavlov in his laboratory in the Institute of Experimental Medicine.

In 1929, Gantt founded the Pavlovian Laboratory at Johns Hopkins University's Henry Phipps Psychiatric Clinic, where John Dewey played a major role in helping him to get a faculty position. He was director of the Pavlovian Laboratory at Johns Hopkins from 1930 to 1964. In 1948, he and William G. Reese founded the Psychological Research Laboratory at the Veterans Administration Hospital in Perry Point, Maryland.

In 1955, Gantt founded the Pavlovian Society, of which he served as president from then until 1965. He went on to found the society's journal, Conditional Reflex, in 1965. He insisted on giving the journal this name because the term "conditional" preserves the fact that the reflex, rather than being fixed, is dependent on a stimulus and subject to change. He was the founding editor-in-chief of Conditional Reflex (later renamed the Pavlovian Journal of Biological Science) from 1966 to 1978.

== Honors and awards ==
Gantt was elected a fellow of the American Association for the Advancement of Science in 1934. He received the Lasker Award in 1946 and the American Heart Association Award in 1950. He was nominated for (but did not win) a Nobel Prize in Medicine in 1970, and received the Gold Medal Award from the Society of Biological Psychiatry in 1972. In 1975, he received both the van Giesen Award from the New York Psychiatric Institute and the Purkinje Medical Society Award.

== Personal life and death ==
Gantt married Mary Gould Richardson on June 23, 1934. They remained married until she died of cancer on July 17, 1964. They had a son, Andrew, and a daughter, Emily. After the death of his first wife he married the former Rebecca Annie Esler in August of 1965. Gantt died on February 26, 1980, in Baltimore, Maryland, after a short illness. He is buried at Rock Cliff in Wingina, Virginia, the same property on which he was born. This property met criterion B to be added to the National Register of Historic Places because Gantt was born there, and lived there until 1910; it also met criterion C because it is associated with his medical career.
