= Jennifer M. Heemstra =

American chemistry professor

Jen Heemstra
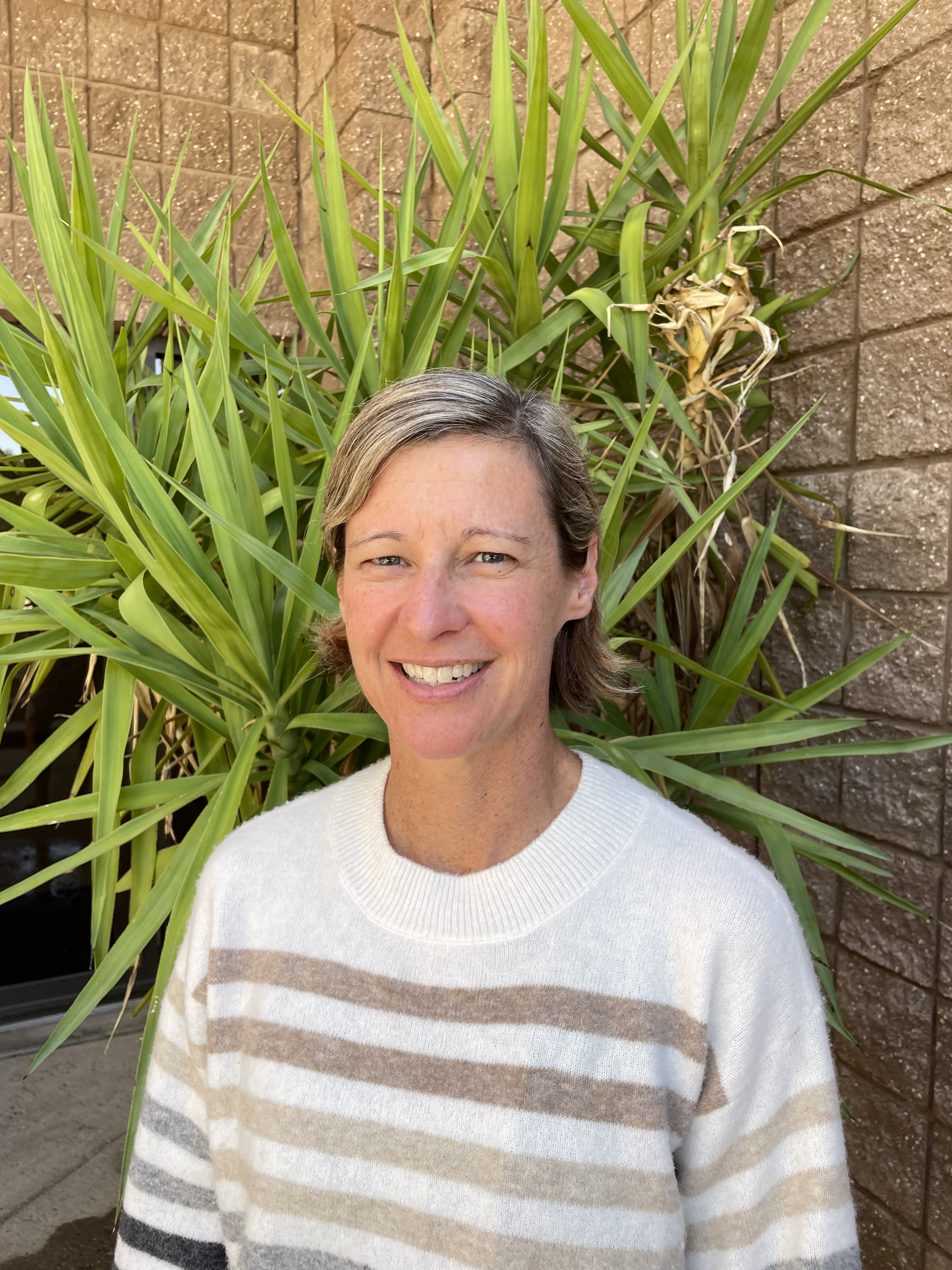
- Jen Heemstra at the 2026 Cottrell Scholars Conference in Tucson
- Born: Jennifer Margaret Cary
- Education: University of Illinois at Urbana Champaign; University of California, Irvine
- Scientific career
- Institutions: University of Utah; Emory University; Washington University in St. Louis
- Thesis: Folding-Promoted Reactivity and Tunable Structure of Pyridine-Containing M-Phenylene Ethynylene Helical Cavitands (2005)
- Doctoral advisor: Jeffrey S. Moore
- Website: www.heemstralab.com

Jennifer Margaret Heemstra (née Cary) is a professor of chemistry at Washington University in St. Louis. In her research, she makes use of the ability of nucleic acids to self-assemble and recognise other molecules. Alongside her research, Heemstra is a science communicator and writes a regular column for Chemical & Engineering News.

== Early life and education ==
Heemstra decided that she wanted to be a scientist whilst she was at high school, and she took part in the Science Olympiad. Heemstra earned an undergraduate degree in chemistry at the University of California, Irvine in 2000. She was an undergraduate researcher with James Nowick, where she investigated the folding of beta sheets and became interested in supramolecular chemistry. She earned her Ph.D. at the University of Illinois at Urbana–Champaign where she worked with Jeffrey S. Moore on phenylene ethynylene cavitands. On the day of her doctoral defense, Heemstra received a phone call from her proposed postdoctoral advisor who was concerned that she would become pregnant during her research position, which would result in her taking time out of the laboratory. Heemstra lost the postdoctoral position as a result, and instead spent two years working on medicinal chemistry in industry before starting a different postdoctoral position at Harvard University. There, she developed new approaches to template nucleic acids, working under the supervision of David Liu.

== Research and career ==
Heemstra joined the University of Utah in 2010 and was appointed associate professor with tenure in 2016. She moved to Emory University in 2017 and was promoted to full professor. In 2022, she became chair and the Charles Allen Thomas professor of chemistry at Washington University.

In her research, Heemstra investigates the use of biomolecular platforms for self-assembly, molecular recognition and in vitro catalysis. Her research considers the detection and sequestration of small molecules. She has demonstrated that nucleic acid aptamers can be used in biosensing. In particular, split aptamers can self-assemble when particular small molecules are present, resulting in chemical ligation within DNA. This can be used to detect specific pharmaceutical molecules. Heemstra has shown that these DNA sensors can be used to detect the enantiopurity of the small molecule targets via fluorescence.

Heemstra is working on new approaches to monitor RNA editing, through the use of fluorescence labelling, as well as ways to manipulate these modifications for genetic engineering. She has worked on threose nucleic acids (TNAs), which can be used to confer genetic information and in the detection of small molecule toxins.

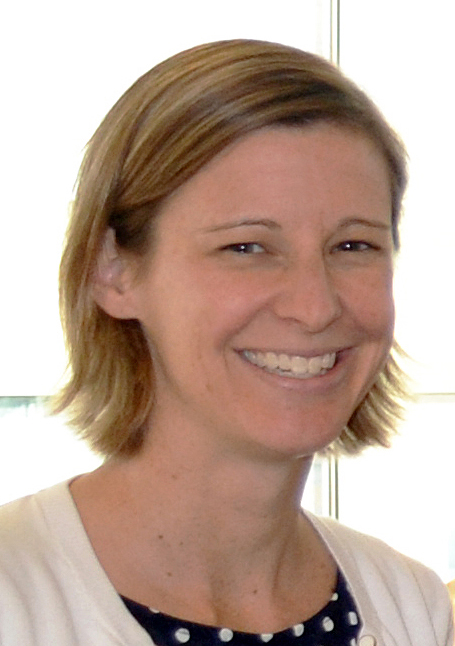
Heemstra in 2019

=== Teaching and science communication ===
Alongside her scientific research, Heemstra leads a research program in chemistry education and how students' perceive failure. She has spoken about the need for scientists to embrace failure to succeed in their research. Heemstra is a science communicator who writes a regular column Office Hours for Chemical & Engineering News. She has discussed her scientific career on their podcast, Stereo Chemistry. She has written for Nature Careers, Wiley and Editage, as well as on her own blog, Things That Change the Way I Think. She has been described as one of the "most influential scientists on social media". She is the author of the book Labwork to Leadership: A concise guide to thriving in the science job you weren't trained for (2025), ISBN 0-674-25863-0.

=== Awards and Honors ===
- 2021 American Chemical Society Rising Star Award
- 2018 Scialog Fellow.
- 2015 Cottrell Scholars Award

=== Selected publications ===
Her publications include:

- Heemstra, Jennifer M. (2006). "The chain-length dependence test". Accounts of Chemical Research. 39 (1): 11–20. doi:10.1021/ar0501267. PMID 16411735.
- Cary, Jennifer M. (2002). "Hydrogen Bond-Stabilized Helix Formation of am-Phenylene Ethynylene Oligomer". Organic Letters. 4 (26): 4663–4666. doi:10.1021/ol0270982. PMID 12489955.
- Heemstra, Jennifer M. (2012). "Enzyme-linked small-molecule detection using split aptamer ligation". Analytical Chemistry. 84 (14): 6104–6109. doi:10.1021/ac300997q. PMID 22715870.

== Personal life ==
Heemstra is married with two sons. Outside her work she takes part in rock climbing, cycling and swimming. She has said that Rosalind Franklin is her favourite scientist.
