= James Nowick =

- Education: Columbia University; Massachusetts Institute of Technology
- Scientific career
- Fields: Chemistry of peptidomimetics
- Workplaces: University of California, Irvine
- Notable students: Jennifer M. Heemstra
- Website: http://www.chem.uci.edu/~jsnowick/groupweb/

James Nowick is a professor of chemistry at University of California, Irvine. His research is focused on peptidomimetic (peptide-like) molecules and their potential applications to the study of amyloid-like protein aggregates, which are associated with neurodegenerative diseases such as Alzheimer's disease. Nowick is well known for his interest in chemistry education and is the organizer of the Open Chemistry series of video lectures distributed by UCI. Nowick is openly gay and in 2009 received the Scientist of the Year award from the National Organization of Gay and Lesbian Scientists and Technical Professionals (NOGLSTP), an affiliate of the American Association for the Advancement of Science.

== Academic career ==
Nowick received his bachelor's degree from Columbia University in 1985 and his Ph.D. from the Massachusetts Institute of Technology in 1990. He joined the faculty at University of California, Irvine in 1991.

Nowick's research group studies the synthesis and design of peptidomimetic molecules, or those that resemble peptides, with particular interest in molecules that replicate features of beta sheets such as their characteristic hydrogen bonding patterns. Beta sheet interactions are known to be involved in the formation of amyloid fibrils found in the brains of patients with Alzheimer's disease and in other protein misfolding diseases. Nowick's group studies molecules that interfere with the formation of these interactions in order to improve understanding of the biochemical mechanisms underlying these diseases.

Nowick was a recipient of the Arthur C. Cope Scholar Award from the American Chemical Society in 1998. He is a fellow of the American Association for the Advancement of Science.

== Teaching, outreach, and activism ==
Nowick is well known for his interest in undergraduate education, public outreach, and mentorship, particularly of younger LGBT scientists. As a graduate student at MIT he founded both a graduate student LGBT organization and a chemistry outreach program for high school students, which has since expanded to reach a thousand students per year. As a professor at UCI Nowick organized the Open Chemistry program, which provides free video lectures corresponding to most UCI undergraduate chemistry courses and which received a Distance Education Innovation Award in 2013. He has received several awards from UCI for excellence in undergraduate teaching.

Nowick is openly gay and is active in advocating for LGBT visibility in the sciences and in mentoring LGBT students. He established a seminar course called "Queer Science, Queer Scientists" at UCI, has organized campus panels on topics in LGBT advocacy such as California's ballot measure against same-sex marriage in 2008, and is involved in the Gay and Transgender Chemists and Allies Subdivision of the American Chemical Society.
