= Beckman Institute for Advanced Science and Technology =

Research institute in Urbana, Illinois

The Beckman Institute for Advanced Science and Technology
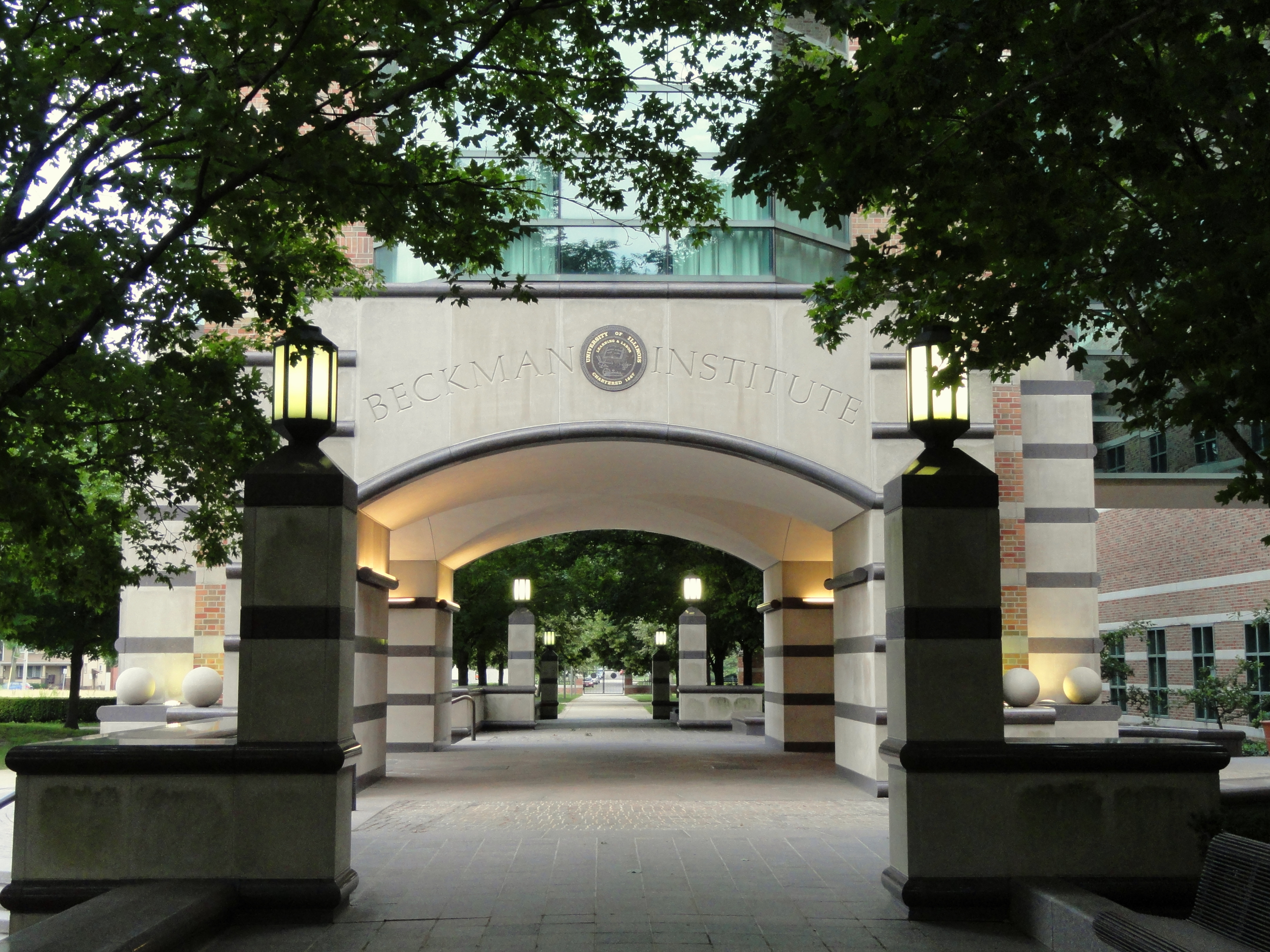
- Established: 1989
- Mission: interdisciplinary collaborative research
- Focus: Intelligent Systems, Integrative Imaging, Molecular Science and Engineering
- Director: Stephen Maren
- Address: 405 North Mathews Avenue
- Location: Urbana, Illinois, United States
- Coordinates: 40.1158°N 88.2274°W
- Website: beckman.illinois.edu

The Beckman Institute for Advanced Science and Technology is a unit of the University of Illinois Urbana-Champaign dedicated to interdisciplinary research. A gift from scientist, businessman, and philanthropist Arnold O. Beckman (1900–2004) and his wife Mabel (1900–1989) led to the building of the Institute which opened in 1989. It is one of five institutions which receive support from the Arnold and Mabel Beckman Foundation on an ongoing basis. Current research at Beckman involves the areas of molecular engineering, intelligent systems, and imaging science. Researchers in these areas work across traditional academic boundaries in scientific projects that can lead to the development of real-world applications in medicine, industry, electronics, and human health across the lifespan.

== History ==
The Beckman Institute for Advanced Science and Technology has its origins in a 1983 meeting in which chancellor John E. Cribbet, Theodore L. Brown, Mort Weir, Lewis Barron and Ned Goldwasser strategized about approaching private sources to fund new large-scale science projects and centers on the University of Illinois campus. Two committees were formed, chaired by William T. Greenough (psychology) and Greg Stillman (electrical and computer engineering) (later Karl Hess) to develop ideas for a broadly multidisciplinary research facility. Thomas Eugene Everhart, who succeeded Cribbet as chancellor in 1984, and Sarah Wasserman, assistant vice-chancellor for research, helped Brown and Weir to review and develop the final proposal. The committee reports were combined to propose an institute with two main divisions, a center for biology, behavior, and cognition, and another center for materials science, computers and computation. The institution's research program would explore intelligence in the broadest possible sense, extending "from artificial systems invented by man to natural systems found in the biological world".

Arnold Beckman was approached with the proposal by university president Stanley lkenberry, Lew Barron, and Mort Weir. Beckman estimated that the proposal would require the unprecedented sum of $50 million. On October 5, 1985, the university officially announced that Arnold and Mabel Beckman had made the largest donation ever given to a public university at that time – $40M, with a $10M supplement from the state of Illinois – to build a research center at Illinois that would encourage scientists and engineers from different disciplines to work together. By December 10, 1985, the university had chosen the architectural firm of Smith, Hinchman and Grylls (SH&G) (now SmithGroup) and architectural designer Ralph Youngren for the project. A symbolic ground-breaking ceremony took place October 10, 1986. Theodore L. Brown, who had been actively involved in the project as vice chancellor for research and graduate dean, became the first director of the institute as of March 12, 1987. William T. Greenough and Karl Hess became associate directors, with half-time appointments, in the fall of 1987.

By December 1988, the building was sufficiently advanced that faculty groups could begin to move in. Administrative offices were temporarily located in the basement. An official inauguration ceremony was held on April 7, 1989, to open the Beckman Institute for Advanced Science and Technology as one of the first research centers in the world dedicated to interdisciplinary research. Theodore L. Brown was succeeded as director in the summer of 1993 by chemist Jiri Jonas. Jiri Jonas was the Beckman Institute Director from 1993 to 2001; he was succeeded by Pierre Wiltzius, Beckman Institute Director from 2001 to 2008; Tamer Başar, Interim Director from 2008 to 2009; Arthur F. Kramer, Director from 2010 to 2016; Jeffrey S. Moore, Director from 2016 to 2022; and Nadya Mason, Director from 2022-2023. Catherine J. Murphy was interim Director from 2023-2024, and Stephen Maren was named Director in July 2024.

According to the 2022–2023 Annual Report of the Beckman Institute for Advanced Science and Technology, about 200 faculty members, 500 graduate students, 325 undergraduate students, 80 postdocs and 150 staff members conduct research or work at the Beckman Institute.

== Research ==
External videos
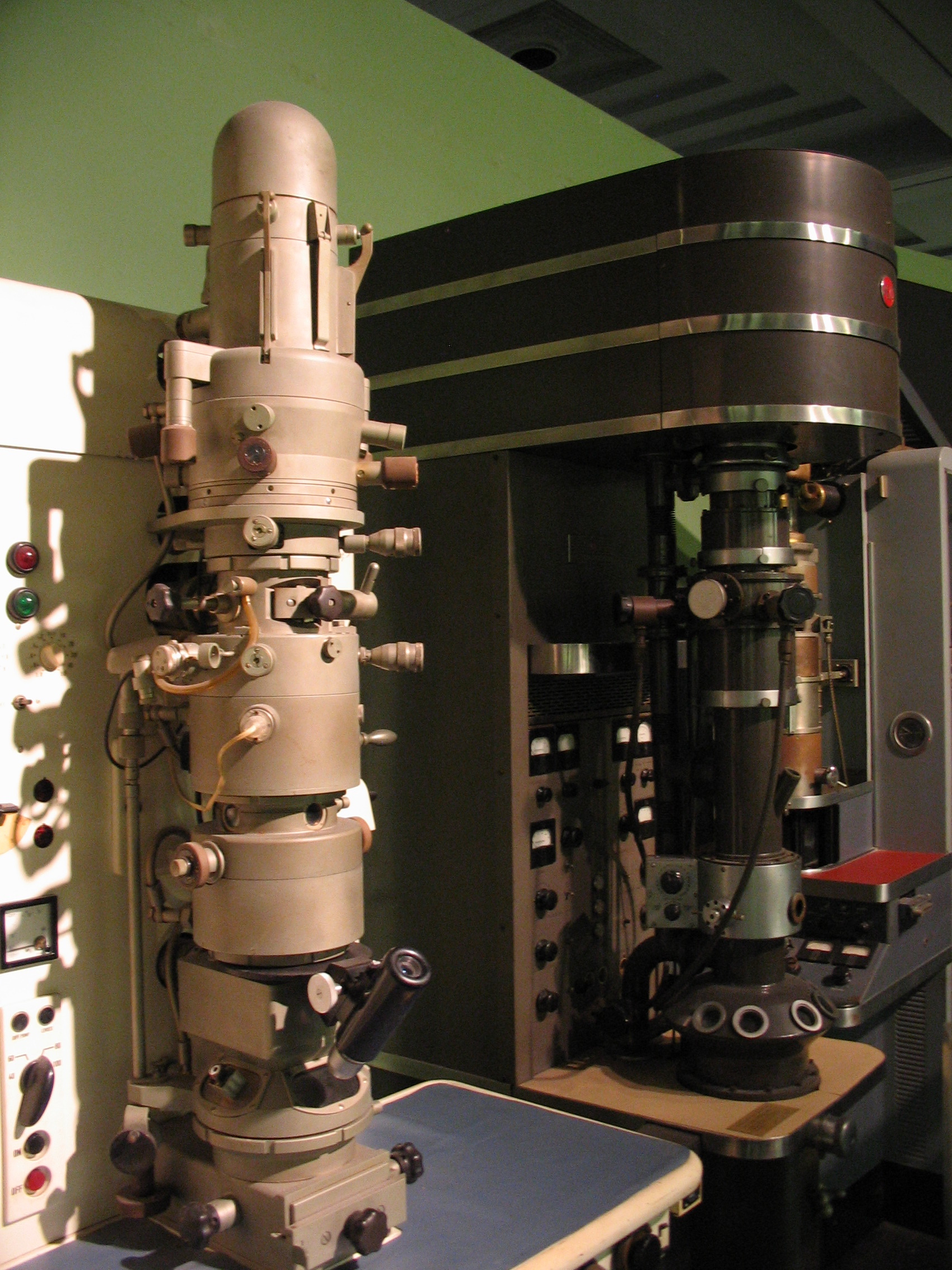
- "Overview of the Beckman Institute", Beckman Institute

Scientific exploration at the Beckman Institute is centered around three broad research themes: Intelligent Systems, Integrative Imaging, and Molecular Science and Engineering.

The Intelligent Systems research theme (IntelSys) is a merging of two older themes (Biological Intelligence and Human-Computer Intelligent Interaction). The theme is comprehensive in scope, as researchers seek to understand the brain, cognition, and behavior from the molecular and cellular levels to higher cognitive functions such as memory, attention, and decision making. It also includes technology research such as computer vision, event-related optical signal and speech recognition.

The Integrative Imaging (IntIm) research theme is geared toward the interdisciplinary discovery of fundamental principles in imaging science, and developing new technologies for the next generation of imaging instruments and novel techniques for basic and translational research. Many researchers in the IntIm theme are working on biomedical applications, using ultrasound, magnetic resonance imaging, biophotonics, or medical optical imaging.

The Molecular Science and Engineering (MSE) research theme brings together scientists from biology, engineering, physics and chemistry, to study molecular structures and processes. The MSE research portfolio includes molecular engineering, self-healing materials, and computational biophysics (such as NAMD).

== Notable faculty ==
Tenure-track or tenured faculty members of the University of Illinois Urbana-Champaign are eligible to become members of the Beckman Institute. Prominent members of the Beckman Institute have included:

- Narendra Ahuja, computer vision
- Tamer Başar, interim Director
- Rashid Bashir, bionanotechnology
- J. Kathryn Bock, psycholinguistics
- Stephen A. Boppart, biophotonics
- Martin D. Burke, chemistry
- Kathryn B. H. Clancy, anthropology
- Neal J. Cohen, memory systems and neuroscience
- Jennifer S. Cole, linguistics
- Brian T. Cunningham, biosensor engineering
- Minh Do, signal and image processing
- Gregory S. Girolami, chemistry
- William T. Greenough, neuroscience
- Martin Gruebele, chemistry
- Karl Hess, semiconductor physics
- Thomas Huang, image formation and processing
- Douglas L. Jones, image and signal processing
- Arthur F. Kramer, cognitive aging and neuroscience
- Paul Lauterbur, magnetic resonance imaging
- Jean-Pierre Leburton, nanotechnology
- Stephen E. Levinson, robotics
- Jennifer A. Lewis, directed assembly of soft functional materials
- Zaida Luthey-Schulten, molecular dynamics simulation
- Nadya Mason, physics
- Liviu Mirica, chemistry
- Jeffrey S. Moore, materials chemistry
- Catherine J. Murphy, chemistry
- Gabriel Popescu, quantitative phase imaging
- Richard Powers, novelist
- John A. Rogers, soft electronics
- Justin Rhodes, neurobiology
- Klaus Schulten, computational biophysics
- Daniel Simons, psychology
- Nancy Sottos, self-healing materials
- Jonathan V. Sweedler, analytical chemistry
- Scott R. White, self-healing materials

== Beckman Fellowships ==
The Beckman Institute offers a variety of fellowship programs, which enable researchers to work for short periods of time at the Institute. Beckman Postdoctoral Fellowships are awarded to Beckman scholars who receive 3-year appointments, including both a stipend and a research budget. The first Beckman postdoctoral scholars were Efrat Shimshoni (condensed matter physics) and Andrew Nobel (information theory and statistics). Beckman Graduate Fellowships are awarded to students who are working at the master's or doctorate level. Beckman Senior Fellowships are awarded to senior faculty from other institutions.

Beckman Fellowships administered through the Beckman Institute should not be confused with those administered through the Center for Advanced Study (CAS) at the University of Urbana-Champaign. The CAS awards a series of Beckman Fellowships and Beckman Research Awards which support faculty at Urbana-Champaign in their research activities. These awards were funded through an endowment from Arnold and Mabel Beckman, given in the late 1970s, prior to the establishment of the Beckman Institute. They are administered separately and are awarded throughout the university, not just within the sciences.

== Research services ==
The Beckman Institute hosts two major core research facilities. The Biomedical Imaging Center (BIC) includes the Magnetic Resonance Imaging Laboratory, the Molecular Imaging Laboratory, and the Ultrasound Imaging Laboratory. The Imaging Technology Group includes the Microscopy Suite and the Visualization Laboratory.

== Beckman Institute Open House ==
The Beckman Institute Open House is an annual event held in conjunction with UIUC Engineering Open House.

== See also ==
- Arnold O. Beckman
- Beckman Coulter
- National Center for Supercomputing Applications, another interdisciplinary research unit of UIUC
- Institute for Genomic Biology, another interdisciplinary research unit of UIUC
- Prairie Research Institute, another interdisciplinary research unit of UIUC
- Coordinated Science Laboratory, an interdisciplinary research unit of the UIUC College of Engineering that is next door to the Beckman Institute
- Nadine Barrie Smith
