= Stephen E. Levinson =

- Born: September 27, 1944 (age 81); New York City, New York State, United States
- Education: University of Rhode Island, Harvard University
- Scientific career
- Fields: Robotics and language
- Workplaces: University of Illinois at Urbana–Champaign, Beckman Institute for Advanced Science and Technology

External videos
- 60-Second Science: Stephen Levinson on Artificial Intelligence and Language, Beckman Institute for Advanced Science and Technology
- Teaching Bert: iCub Robot Learns About the World, Stephen Levinson, Beckman Institute for Advanced Science and Technology

Stephen E. Levinson (September 27, 1944, New York City) is a professor of Electrical and Computer Engineering at the University of Illinois at Urbana-Champaign (UIUC), leader of the Language Acquisition and Robotics Lab at UIUC, and a full-time faculty member of the Beckman Institute for Advanced Science and Technology at UIUC. He works on speech synthesis, acquisition and recognition and the development of anthropomorphic robots.

== Early life and education ==
Stephen E. Levinson was born on September 27, 1944 in New York City. He earned a B. A. degree in Engineering Sciences at Harvard University in 1966. He earned his M. S. (1972) and Ph.D. (1974) degrees in Electrical Engineering at the University of Rhode Island in Kingston, Rhode Island.

== Career ==
Levinson worked as a design engineer at General Dynamics from 1966-1969, after completing his bachelor's degree, and as an instructor in computer science at Yale University from 1974-1976, after completing his Ph.D.

In 1976, he joined AT&T Bell Laboratories in Murray Hill, New Jersey. There he studied speech recognition and understanding. He was a visiting researcher at the NTT Musashino Electrical Communication Laboratory in Tokyo, Japan in 1979, and a visiting fellow at Cambridge University in 1984. In 1990, Levinson was appointed head of Linguistics Research at Bell Labs. He directed research on speech synthesis, speech recognition and the translation of spoken language.

In 1997, Levinson moved to the Department of Electrical and Computer Engineering of the University of Illinois at Urbana-Champaign, where he leads the Language Acquisition and Robotics Lab. His areas of teaching and research include speech and language processing, speech synthesis, and language acquisition. Levinson is developing computational models of the brain, mind, and language acquisition using an iCub humanoid robot. The robot is designed to learn through experience, similar to the way in which a human child might learn. Levinson is the first researcher in North American to work with this type of robot, which was designed in Europe. Skills that researchers hope to teach the robot include juggling, walking, talking, and memory formation.

Levinson has published more than 100 technical papers and holds several patents. He is a founding editor of the journal Computer Speech and Language, and an editor of the journal Speech Technology. Among others books, Levinson is the author of Mathematical Models for Speech Technology (2005) and co-author of Autonomous Robotics and Deep Learning (2014) and Autonomous Military Robotics (2014).

== Awards and honors ==
- fellow, Institute of Electrical and Electronics Engineers (IEEE) 1986 for contribution to the theory and application of statistical pattern recognition to automatic speech recognition.
- fellow, Acoustical Society of America 1983
- member, Association for Computing Machinery
