= Donald J. Darensbourg =

American inorganic chemist

- Born: Donald Jude Darensbourg; 1941 (age 84–85); Baton Rouge, Louisiana, U.S.
- Education: California State University, Los Angeles BS (1964) University of Illinois Urbana-Champaign PhD (1968)
- Scientific career
- Thesis: Infrared intensities in substituted metal carbonyls (1968)
- Doctoral advisor: Theodore L. Brown

Donald J. Darensbourg is an American inorganic chemist. He is a Distinguished Professor of Chemistry at Texas A&M University. He was elected a member of the National Academy of Sciences in 2022. His research focuses on the spectroscopy and mechanisms of metal carbonyl complexes and on the chemistry of carbon dioxide in catalytic copolymerization reactions with epoxides and oxetanes.

== Education ==
Born in Baton Rouge, Louisiana, in 1941, Darensbourg obtained a BS from California State University, Los Angeles in 1964, followed by a PhD from University of Illinois Urbana-Champaign in 1968 under the guidance of Theodore L. Brown.

== Career ==
Darensbourg started work as a research chemist at Texaco Research Center in 1968. In 1969, he was appointed assistant professor at the State University of New York at Buffalo. In 1973, he taught at Tulane University, eventually attaining the rank of professor. In 1982, Donald Darensbourg moved to Texas A&M University with Marcetta Y. Darensbourg. He was awarded the title of Distinguished Professor in 2010.

In 2023 Darensbourg was named the recipient of the Southeastern Conference (SEC) Faculty Achievement Award for Texas A&M.

Darensbourg's research interests include using carbon dioxide as monomer and solvent in the production of biodegradable copolymers.
