= Stephen Maren =

American behavioral neuroscientist

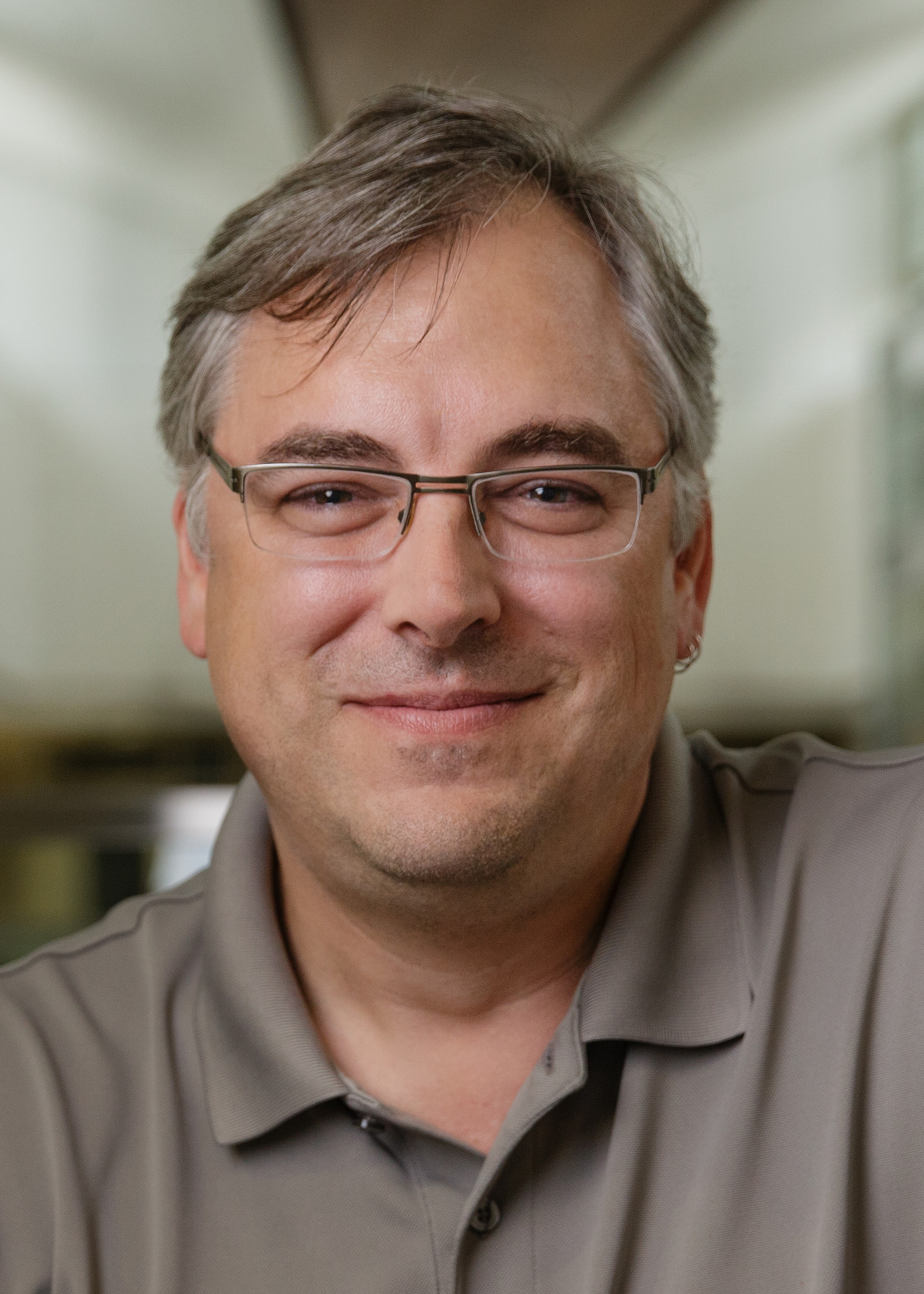
Stephen Maren in the Interdisciplinary Life Sciences Building at Texas A&M University. Photo by Gabriel Chmielewski.

Stephen Andrew Maren (born November 7, 1967) is an American behavioral neuroscientist investigating the brain mechanisms of emotional memory, particularly the role context plays in the behavioral expression of fear. He has discovered brain circuits regulating context-dependent memory, including mapping functional connections between the hippocampus, prefrontal cortex, and amygdala that are involved in the expression and extinction of learned fear responses.

Maren obtained his undergraduate education at the University of Illinois at Urbana-Champaign, graduating in psychology (BS) in 1989. His undergraduate research resulted in an honors thesis that described, for the first time, the activity of basolateral amygdala neurons during this form of learning. He obtained his PhD in Biological Sciences (Neurobiology) in 1993 at the University of Southern California. Maren explored the role for glutamate receptors in hippocampal long-term potentiation and the relationship of long-term potentiation to learning and memory. He was the first to demonstrate that expression of long-term potentiation is associated with an increase in postsynaptic glutamate receptors.

Maren received his post-doctoral training with Michael S. Fanselow at the University of California, Los Angeles from 1993 to 1996. He established a role for amygdaloid long-term potentiaion in Pavlovian fear conditioning, as well as defining the role for the hippocampus in contextual learning and memory.

Maren joined the faculty of University of Michigan in 1996 as an assistant professor in the Biopsychology Area in the Department of Psychology. He moved to Texas A&M University in 2012, where he was the Charles H. Gregory Chair of Liberal Arts and Professor of Psychological and Brain Sciences and a Presidential Impact Fellow at Texas A&M University. He was named University Distinguished Professor in 2018. In 2024, he joined the University of Illinois Urbana-Champaign as the Director of the Beckman Institute for Advanced Science and Technology

Maren has received the Distinguished Scientific Award for an Early Career Contribution to Psychology (Behavioral and Cognitive Neuroscience) in 2001 and the D. O. Hebb Distinguished Scientific Contribution Award in 2017, both from the American Psychological Association. He was awarded the W. Horsley Gantt Medal by the Pavlovian Society in 2019. He is a fellow of both the American Psychological Association and the Association for Psychological Science. His research is widely cited and he is among the top 1% of cited neuroscientists in the world. Maren's research has been continuously funded by the National Institutes of Health since 1995 and he has received the Memory and Cognitive Disorders award from the McKnight Endowment for Neuroscience and a NARSAD Distinguished Investigator Grant from the Brain & Behavior Research Foundation. He is a member of the Scientific Council of the Brain & Behavior Research Foundation and is co-editor-in-chief of Behavioural Brain Research
