= Marcetta Y. Darensbourg =

American inorganic chemist

- Born: Marcetta Bernice York
- Education: Union College B.S. (1963); University of Illinois Ph.D. (1967)
- Spouse: Donald J. Darensbourg
- Awards: Member, National Academy of Sciences (2017)
- Scientific career
- Workplaces: Vassar College (1967–1969) Tulane University (1971–1982) Texas A&M University (1982–present)
- Thesis: Kinetic studies of some organolithium reactions (1967)
- Doctoral advisor: Theodore L. Brown

Marcetta York Darensbourg is an American inorganic chemist. She is a Distinguished Professor of Chemistry at Texas A&M University. Her research focuses on bioinorganic and organometallic chemistry, particularly synthetic models of hydrogenase enzymes and iron nitrosyl complexes. She is known for her work on metallodithiolate ligands and biomimetic catalysts relevant to hydrogen metabolism. In 2017, she was elected a member of the National Academy of Sciences.

== Early life ==
Marcetta Bernice (York) Darensbourg was born May 4, 1942, in Artemus, Kentucky. She is the daughter of school teachers Atlas H. York and Elsie Walton York. She has an older sister, Mary Lucille York, and a younger brother, Larry Hercules York. Darensbourg attended Knox Central High School in Barbourville, Kentucky. During high school, she developed an interest in science, influenced in part by a teacher, Mrs. Bolton, who taught biology, physics, and chemistry.

== Education ==
Darensbourg received a B.S. in chemistry from Union College in 1963 and a Ph.D. in inorganic chemistry from the University of Illinois under the supervision of Theodore L. Brown in 1967. Her doctoral work focused on kinetic studies of organolithium reactions.

== Career ==
Darensbourg was an assistant professor at Vassar College from 1967 to 1969. From 1971 to 1982, she taught at Tulane University, where she attained the rank of professor. In 1982, she joined Texas A&M University as a professor, together with Donald J. Darensbourg, and was named Distinguished Professor in 2010. Her research includes studies of hydrogenase enzymes and related metal complexes.

Darensbourg has served on the board of Inorganic Syntheses and was editor of volume 32. In 2011, she was elected a fellow of the American Academy of Arts and Sciences.

In 2017, she was elected a member of the National Academy of Sciences.

== Research ==
=== Organolithium chemistry ===
Darensbourg studied the kinetics and aggregation behavior of organolithium compounds, including tert-butyllithium, using spectroscopic methods such as ^{7}Li NMR. Her work examined factors influencing dissociation and exchange processes in these systems.

=== Metal carbonyl chemistry ===
Darensbourg has studied the reactivity of metal carbonyl complexes, particularly the factors governing nucleophilic attack and ligand behavior in transition metal systems. Spectroscopic studies of carbene pentacarbonyl complexes demonstrated that carbene ligands can act as strong sigma donors and pi acceptors relative to carbonyl ligands. Additional studies examined how ligand environments influence the site and selectivity of nucleophilic attack in metal carbonyl systems.

=== Hydrogenase mimics ===
Darensbourg has developed synthetic models of hydrogenase enzyme active sites, particularly iron- and nickel-based organometallic complexes that mimic biological hydrogen metabolism. These systems can carry out catalytic hydrogen production in the absence of the native protein environment. Her work has also examined factors affecting catalytic performance, including oxygen sensitivity and mechanisms of inactivation. More recent studies have explored structural variations in hydrogenase-inspired complexes, including chalcogenide-containing systems, to improve catalytic activity and tolerance to oxygen.

=== Metallodithiolates chemistry ===
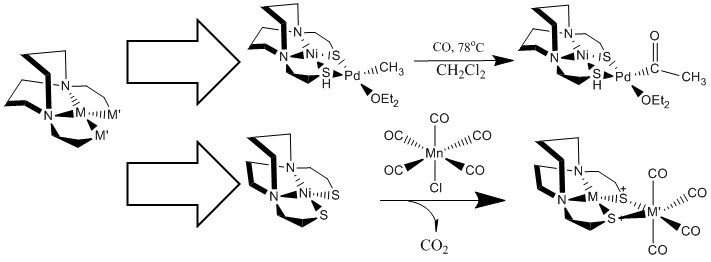
Examples of nickel and palladium dithiolate ligands

Darensbourg has studied metallodithiolate ligands as building blocks for transition metal complexes relevant to bioinorganic chemistry. Her work has examined how these ligands coordinate metals such as nickel, iron, and cobalt, influencing electronic structure and reactivity in catalytic systems. These studies contributed to understanding metal–sulfur bonding and the design of multimetallic complexes with catalytic and biomimetic functions. Related work has explored applications in catalysis and small-molecule transformations. More recent work has extended these systems to studies of electronic structure and magnetic interactions in sulfur-bridged multimetallic complexes, including paramagnetic iron nitrosyl species and their coupling behavior.

== Awards ==
Darensbourg has received several honors for her contributions to chemistry and education, including the American Chemical Society Willard Gibbs Award (2019), the American Chemical Society Award in Organometallic Chemistry (2017), and the SEC Professor of the Year award (2018). She has also received teaching and mentoring awards from Texas A&M University and UCLA (2016), the Kosolapoff Award from Auburn University (2018),, and the Eminent Scholar Award from the Texas A&M Aggie Women Network (2024).
