= Nadine Barrie Smith =

American biomedical researcher

- Born: 1962; Chicago, IL, United States
- Died: 2010 (aged 47–48); Pine Grove Mills, PA, United States
- Education: University of Illinois at Urbana-Champaign
- Known for: Research in therapeutic ultrasound
- Scientific career
- Fields: Biomedical research
- Workplaces: Harvard Medical School; Pennsylvania State University

Nadine Barrie Smith (1962–2010) was an American biomedical researcher in the field of therapeutic ultrasound and non-invasive drug delivery. She was also an educator and mentor, especially to women students.

== Personal life ==
Smith was born in Chicago, Illinois to Jean and Barron Smith. The family has deep roots in Japan (Sendai and Yokohama), associated with the Sekiguchi and Asaki clans. She has two sisters, Arnette Bosch and Jolene Smith. She graduated from Chicago’s Lane Tech High School in 1980. She was married to Andrew Webb in New Zealand. Outside of her scientific career, she was an accomplished sports photographer, equestrian, and mountaineer. Dr. Nadine Barrie Smith died unexpectedly at her home in Pine Grove Mills, PA, on April 2, 2010.

== Education ==
Smith earned a bachelor of science degree in computer science at the University of Illinois at Urbana-Champaign (UIUC) in 1985, a master's degree in electrical and computer engineering at UIUC in 1989, with the thesis Automated Ultrasonic Exposure System to Assess the Effects of In Utero Diagnostic Ultrasound. She received her Ph.D. in biophysics at UIUC in 1996. Her dissertation was titled Effect of myofibril length and tissue constituents on acoustic propagation properties of muscle.

== Awards ==
During this time she was honored with several awards, including the IEEE Ultrasonics, Ferroelectrics, and Frequency Control Society Award (1994), UIUC Outstanding Teaching Recognition Award (1995-1996), and Panhellenic Association of the University of Illinois Outstanding Staff Member Award (1995). She was also elected to Sigma Xi, The Scientific Research Society (1996).

== Research ==
Smith worked on a three-year postdoctoral fellowship with Professor Kullervo Hynynen in the Radiology Department at Brigham and Women's Hospital, Harvard Medical School, where she developed an intracavitary ultrasound hyperthermia array used for human prostate cancer treatments. Her major contributions included the first MRI-guided closed-loop feedback control of high intensity focused ultrasound treatment (see Works below), which has since developed into an important clinical procedure.

From 1999 through 2010, Smith was a faculty member in the Department of Bioengineering at Pennsylvania State University. She was involved in several programs in Penn State’s College of Engineering, including the Graduate Program in Acoustics, the Materials Research Institute, and the Penn State Diabetes Center. She was promoted to full Professor in 2010. Her research concentrated on ultrasound for cancer treatment and noninvasive drug delivery. She published more than fifty papers in both areas (see Works, below). She collaborated with Focus Surgery, Inc., the makers of the Sonoblate®500 and with Piezo Resonance Innovations (now Actuated Medical, Inc.) on SBIR funding from the National Institutes of Health.

Smith’s work has also been publicized in the popular press both nationally and internationally with her research in needleless insulin delivery and glucose sensing for diabetes.

In 2009/2010 she spent a sabbatical year at the Leiden University Medical Center where she was involved in several projects involving high field human magnetic resonance imaging.

In addition to teaching medical imaging and medical instrumentation classes, Smith designed and developed the capstone Senior Design course for the Bioengineering curriculum at Penn State.

In 2009, Smith was commissioned by Cambridge University Press to co-author an engineering textbook entitled, "Introduction to Medical Imaging: Physics, Engineering and Clinical Applications", which was published in 2011.

Smith was the Co-Chair of the International Association of Science and Technology for Development Signal and Image Processing conference in 2009, the course program co-organizer on RF Coil Design for the European Society for Magnetic Resonance in Medicine and Biology, a member of the Scientific & Technical Program Committee and Student Research Competition (Chair) for the International Society of Therapeutic Ultrasound conference, and an Associate Editor for the Institute of Electrical and Electronics Engineers Transactions on Ultrasonics, Ferro-electronics, and Frequency Control. She was an elected member of both the Bioeffects and Technical Standards Committees of the American Institute of Ultrasound in Medicine.

== Legacy ==
- The Nadine Barrie Smith Memorial Fund and the Nadine Barrie Smith Memorial Fellows Program for female graduate students have been established at the Beckman Institute at the University of Illinois at Urbana-Champaign.
- An undergraduate award, "The Nadine Barrie Smith and Andrew Webb Undergraduate Scholarship for Female Engineers", has been established for promising students with financial needs in the College of Engineering at the University of Illinois at Urbana-Champaign.
- The Nadine Barrie Smith Student Award for the International Society of Therapeutic Ultrasound (ISTU) annual conference has been established in her honor.
- The Nadine Barrie Smith Mentor Award for mentoring female engineering undergraduate students has been established at Penn State University.
- The conference room at the C. J. Gorter MRI Center in the Department of Radiology at the Leiden University Medical Center (The Netherlands) has been dedicated to Smith.
