= Rachel J Whitaker =

American microbiologist

- Education: University of California, Berkeley
- Awards: Teachers Ranked as Excellent (University of Illinois), Allen Distinguished Investigator Award (2017), University Scholar Award (2020), American Academy of Microbiology Fellow
- Scientific career
- Fields: Microbial Ecology, Virology, Archaea, Bacteria, Molecular Evolution, Bioinformatics, Genome Organization, Host-Pathogen Interactions, Microbial Physiology, Infectious Diseases, Astrobiology
- Workplaces: University of Illinois at Urbana-Champaign
- Thesis: (2004)
- Website: http://publish.illinois.edu/whitakerlab/

Rachel J Whitaker is a professor of Microbiology in the School of Molecular and Cellular Biology at the University of Illinois at Urbana-Champaign. Her laboratory's research focuses on the evolution of Archaea, Bacteria, and Viruses in both natural and clinical environments.

== Education and career ==
Whitaker received her B.A. in biology from Wesleyan University in 1993 and her Ph. D in microbiology from University of California, Berkeley in 2004. Following her Ph.D., she was a postdoctoral researcher in geomicrobiology at University of California, Berkeley from 2004 to 2006.

Following the completion of her postdoctoral research, Whitaker became a professor of microbiology at the University of Illinois at Urbana-Champaign, where she has been recognized among 'Teachers Ranked as Excellent.' She received the Allen Distinguished Investigator Award in 2017 and the University Scholar Award in 2020. Whitaker is also a fellow of the American Academy of Microbiology.

Whitaker has published over 50 peer-reviewed research articles which have been cited over 3,000 times. She also was an editor for the book 'Women in Microbiology,' which highlights both historic and modern women scientists in the field of microbial sciences.

== Research focus ==
The Whitaker lab studies the dynamics of microbes and their viruses using a combination of genomics, experimental evolution, modeling, and molecular biology. In particular, the Whitaker lab focuses on the hyperthermophlic archaeon Sulfolobus islandicus and the Gram-negative gammaproteobacterium Pseudomonas aeruginosa as model organisms for studying microbial evolution.

== Scientific community outreach ==
In addition to leading an academic research lab, Whitaker is also active in scientific community outreach in an effort to engage young aspiring scientists and the non-scientific community in the microbial sciences. Outreach initiatives that Whitaker promotes include Project Microbe, a series of inquiry-based activities that teach about the three domains of life (Eukarya, Bacteria, and Archaea)., and Cena y Ciencias, a program that encourages scientific learning in elementary school students of the Spanish-speaking community. Whitaker developed the Project Microbe initiative with Barbara Hug from the Department of Curriculum and Instruction at the University of Illinois at Urbana-Champaign.
