= Brian T. Cunningham =

American engineer, researcher and academic

Brian Cunningham
- Title: Intel Alumni Endowed Chair of Electrical and Computer Engineering
- Spouse: Leanne M. (McNamara) Cunningham
- Children: Andrea Cunningham, Allison Cunningham

Academic background
- Education: B.S., Electrical and Computer Engineering (1986); M.S., Electrical and Computer Engineering (1987); Ph.D., Electrical and Computer Engineering (1990)
- Alma mater: University of Illinois at Urbana-Champaign

Academic work
- Institutions: University of Illinois at Urbana-Champaign

Brian T. Cunningham is an American engineer, researcher and academic. He is a Donald Biggar Willett Professor of Engineering at University of Illinois at Urbana-Champaign. He is a professor of Electrical and Computer Engineering, and a professor of bioengineering.

Cunningham's research interests include biophotonics, bionanophotonics, micro/nanofabrication processes & materials, Bio-MEMS, lab-on-a-chip, microfluidics, biosensing, and applications in drug discovery, health diagnostics, mobile point-of-use detection systems, life science research, environmental monitoring, animal health, and food safety. He has authored or co-authored over 180 peer-reviewed journal papers and holds 86 patents.

Cunningham is most known for his invention and application of nanostructured photonic surfaces that efficiently couple electromagnetic energy into biological analytes, enabling high signal-to-noise sensing of materials that include small molecules, nucleic acids, proteins, virus particles, cells, and tissues.

Cunningham is a Fellow of Institute of Electrical and Electronics Engineers, American Association for the Advancement of Science, National Academy of Inventors, The Optical Society, and American Institute for Medical and Biological Engineering. His work has been recognized through the IEEE Sensors Council Technical Achievement Award (2010) the Engineering in Medicine and Biology Society (EMBS) Technical Achievement Award (2014), and the IEEE Sensors Council Distinguished Lectureship (2013), and the IEEE Photonics Society Distinguished Lectureship (2018–2019).

== Education ==
Cunningham received a B.S. in Electrical and Computer Engineering from University of Illinois at Urbana-Champaign in 1986. He continued his further education at the University of Illinois, receiving an M.S. in 1987 and a Ph.D. in 1990. From 1990 to 1991, he was a postdoctorate scientist at Sandia National Laboratory in the compound semiconductor research group, where he contributed to the development of epitaxial crystal growth methods for InAsSb strained layer superlattices for infrared photodiode sensor applications.

== Career ==
Cunningham worked at the Research Division of Raytheon from 1991 to 1995, where he was the Group Leader for Infrared Sensors Fabrication. In 1995, he joined Micromachined Sensors Group at the Charles Stark Draper Laboratory as a senior member of the technical staff, where he later served in management roles that included Group Leader for MEMS Sensors, and Technical Director for Bioengineering Programs. At Draper Laboratory, Cunningham initiated efforts in biosensors, microfluidics, and tissue engineering. While at Draper Laboratory, Cunningham attended courses at the MIT Sloan Business School, and audited courses in biology at MIT.

In June 2000 founded SRU Biosystems, a company that commercialized Photonic Crystal (PC) biosensors, detection instruments, and assays for applications in drug discovery and diagnostics. SRU Biosystems was sold to XBody Biosciences in 2012, which was subsequently sold to Juno Therapeutics.

Cunningham joined the faculty of the ECE Department at University of Illinois at Urbana-Champaign in 2004 as an associate professor, where he established the Nanosensors Group at the Micro and Nanotechnology Laboratory (MNTL). At Illinois, Cunningham served as the Director of the NSF-funded Center for Innovative Instrumentation Technology (CiiT), and served among the initial faculty to join the newly-formed Bioengineering Department, where he was the founding Director of the Bioengineering Graduate Program. Currently, he has taught many courses at Illinois, such as: ECE 416 (BIOE 416) - Biosensors, ECE 598 BC (ECE 598 BCO, ECE 514, BIOE 516) - Advanced Biosensors, and PATH 490 (PATH 494) - Intro to Research Methodology.

In 2014, he was appointed as the director of MNTL. He was named as a Donald Biggar Willett Professor in Engineering in 2015.

In addition to leading his own research group, Cunningham serves as the PI of the Omics Nanotechnology for Cancer Precision Medicine (ONC-PM) Theme at the Carl R. Woese Institute for Genomic Biology (IGB), where he leads a team for the development of liquid biopsy approaches to cancer diagnostics in collaboration with clinicians at Mayo Clinic.

== Research and work ==
In the late 1980s, Cunningham became the first researcher to demonstrate heavy p-type doping in a compound semiconductor (GaAs and InGaAs) using carbon impurities, including the first to utilize MOCVD epitaxial growth and a carbon halide gas source. Cunningham was also the first to demonstrate the effectiveness of dielectric-based optically resonant surfaces for enhancement of fluorescence and surface-enhanced Raman reporters, particularly through intentional design of multiple resonances into the same structure for simultaneously enhancing the excitation of optical reporters and the extraction of photons.

In the early 2000s, Cunningham did significant work on photonic crystal label-free biosensors. He was the first to demonstrate the use of photonic crystal optical resonators for label-free detection of small molecules, nucleic acids, proteins, viruses, and cells, including the development of the first roll-to-roll manufacturing process for any optical biosensor, the first optical biosensor microplates, and a family of high throughput detection instruments for high throughput drug screening and diagnostics. In 2004, Cunningham authored 'Label-Free Assays on the BIND System'. This paper represented the first publication for the application of photonic crystal biosensors in microplate format for pharmaceutical discovery applications that showed the first methods for detecting small molecule binding to proteins, cell interactions with drugs, and screening modulators for protein interactions.

In the mid-2000s, Cunningham began research on photonic crystal enhancement of photon emitters. He was the first to demonstrate the combined effects of enhanced excitation and enhanced directional extraction from photon emitters (quantum dots, fluorophores, SERS tags) on a photonic crystal surface.

Cunningham's work on photonic crystal microscopy in the early 2010s demonstrated a new form of microscopy that utilizes a photonic crystal slab as the surface, and applied it for the first time for label-free kinetic imaging of live cells, and high signal-noise detection of dielectric or metallic nanoparticles.

Cunningham began working on smartphone spectroscopic biosensors in the early 2010s. In 2013, he wrote the paper, 'Label-free biodetection using a smartphone'.This paper represented the first instance of adapting a smartphone camera to function as a spectrometer for measuring a biological assay.

In the late 2010s, Cunningham's research began focusing on digital resolution biomolecular sensing. Using a novel concept for coupling electromagnetic energy from the macro scale into plasmonic nanoantennas, the Cunningham group was the first to report a new form of biosensor microscopy (Photonic Resonator Absorption Microscopy) and couple it to novel biochemistry approaches for ultrasensitive, single-step, amplification-free detection of proteins or nucleic acid targets with a simple/inexpensive instrument.

== Awards and honors ==
- 2008 - Grainger Program Award for Emerging Technologies
- 2009 - Association for Laboratory Automation, Innovation Award for Top 10 Papers
- 2010 - Medical Scholars Program Outstanding Advisor Award
- 2010 - IEEE Sensors Council Technical Achievement Award
- 2012 - IEEE Fellow
- 2012 - AIMBE Fellow
- 2013 - IEEE Sensors Council Distinguished Lecturer
- 2013 - Massachusetts Excellence Award, SRU Biosystems, Small Business Institute for Excellence in Commerce
- 2013 - Fellow, National Academy of Inventors
- 2014 - Fellow of the Optical Society of America
- 2014 - IEEE Engineering in Medicine and Biology Society (EMBS) Technical Achievement Award
- 2016 - AAAS Fellow
- 2018 - Associate, Center for Advanced Studies
- 2018 - IEEE Photonics Society Distinguished Lecturer
- 2018 - Andrew Yang Research Award: Living Tissue Biosensors
- 2019 - RSC Fellow
- 2023 - Michael S. Feld Biophotonics Award

== Selected publications ==
- Canady, T. D., Li, N., Smith, L. D., Lu, Y., Kohli, M., Smith, A. M., & Cunningham, B. T. (2019). Digital-resolution detection of microRNA with single-base selectivity by photonic resonator absorption microscopy. Proceedings of the National Academy of Sciences, 116(39), 19362–19367.
- Chan, L. L., Pineda, M., Heeres, J. T., Hergenrother, P. J., & Cunningham, B. T. (2008). A General Method for Discovering Inhibitors of Protein−DNA Interactions Using Photonic Crystal Biosensors. ACS Chemical Biology, 3(7), 437–448.
- Cunningham, B. T., Li, P., Schulz, S., Lin, B., Baird, C., Gerstenmaier, J., ... Laing, L. (2004). Label-Free Assays on the BIND System. Journal of Biomolecular Screening, 9(6), 481–490.
- Gallegos, D., Long, K. D., Yu, H., Clark, P. P., Lin, Y., George, S., ... Cunningham, B. T. (2013). Label-free biodetection using a smartphone. Lab on a Chip, 13(11), 2124.
- Ganesh, N., Zhang, W., Mathias, P. C., Chow, E., Soares, J. A. N. T., Malyarchuk, V., ... Cunningham, B. T. (2007). Enhanced fluorescence emission from quantum dots on a photonic crystal surface. Nature Nanotechnology, 2(8), 515–520.
- Liu, J.-N., Huang, Q., Liu, K.-K., Singamaneni, S., & Cunningham, B. T. (2017). Nanoantenna–Microcavity Hybrids with Highly Cooperative Plasmonic–Photonic Coupling. Nano Letters, 17(12), 7569–7577.
- Zhuo, Y., Hu, H., Chen, W., Lu, M., Tian, L., Yu, H., ... Cunningham, B. T. (2014). Single nanoparticle detection using photonic crystal enhanced microscopy. The Analyst, 139(5), 1007–1015.
- Zhuo, Y., Choi, J. S., Yu, H., Harley, B. A., & Cunningham, B. T. (2015). Dynamic Label-free Imaging of Live-cell Adhesion Using Photonic Crystal Enhanced Microscopy (PCEM). Cleo: 2015.
