= William T. Greenough =

American professor of psychology

- Born: October 11, 1944; Seattle, Washington, U.S.
- Died: December 8, 2013 (aged 69); Seattle, Washington, U.S.
- Scientific career
- Fields: Systems neuroscience
- Workplaces: University of Illinois at Urbana–Champaign
- Notable students: Fred R. Volkmar

William Tallant Greenough (October 11, 1944 – December 18, 2013) was a professor of psychology at the University of Illinois at Urbana–Champaign. Greenough was a pioneer in studies of neural development and brain plasticity. He studied learning and memory and the brain's responses to environmental enrichment, exercise, injury, and aging. He demonstrated that the brain continues to form new synaptic connections between nerve cells throughout life in response to environmental enrichment and learning. This mechanism is important to learning and memory storage in the brain. Greenough is regarded as a predominant researcher in this area and has been described as "one of the towering figures in neuroscience".

== Early life and education ==
William Greenough was born in Seattle, Washington, on October 10, 1944. He later lived in Gearhart, Oregon and Seaside, Oregon.

In 1964, at age 19, he completed an undergraduate degree in psychology at the University of Oregon. He earned his master's degree from the University of California, Los Angeles in 1966 and his Ph.D. in psychology at the University of California, Los Angeles in 1969. His thesis title was Pharmacological and Biochemical Studies on Learning Performance as a Function of Post-Weaning Environment in Rats.

== Career ==
Greenough then joined the faculty at the University of Illinois at Urbana–Champaign as an assistant professor, becoming a full professor in 1978. He chaired the psychology committee that helped to form the Beckman Institute for Advanced Science and Technology at Illinois and became one of the Beckman Institute's first two half-time associate directors in the fall of 1987. He served as director of the Beckman Institute's Neuroscience Program from 1997–2000.

In 1998, Greenough was appointed to the Swanlund Endowed Chair in psychology. During his career, Greenough held a broad range of faculty appointments including psychology, psychiatry, bioengineering, cell and structural biology, and molecular and integrative physiology. He became interim director of the Center for Advanced Study in 2000, and was appointed its director in 2001. He retired in 2009, becoming professor emeritus.

Greenough was also active politically, and lobbied the United States Congress to support academic research. In 2007, he co-edited Defining values for research and technology : the university's changing role, based on a lecture series that began at Illinois in 2000. The book examines the history of research funding at American universities and the ways in which federal policy had changed. A shift from public to private sources of funding caused new challenges for universities, financially, strategically, and ethically.

== Research ==
Prior to Greenough's work, the prevalent belief was that the structure of the brain was determined very early in life and did not change substantially other than to degenerate as a result of damage due to injury, illness, or aging. It was believed that synapses were formed early in brain development, and that once the initial structure of the brain was formed, no further synapse formation occurred. The brain was believed to be an anatomically static structure and memories were believed to result from synaptic activity within a fixed nervous system. According to this view, what you were born with determined your potential for the rest of your life.

This view of brain structure, neural activity, and learning was completely overturned by Greenough's research. Greenough initially worked with mice and rat models, later studying primates and humans. His studies demonstrated that fundamental physical changes occurred in neurons in the brain in response to stimulating environments. At the most basic cellular level, the brains of rats that lived in stimulating environments developed more synapses than those that did not. He went on to demonstrate that new synapses were formed as a result of activities that involved learning, not just increased activity. Moreover, changes occurred in areas of the brain that were associated with the performance of specific learned tasks. Observed changes in learning, memory, and synapse formation persisted after training. Learning and memory formation were therefore fundamentally related to ongoing synapse formation. The result of Greenough's work has been a new model of brain 'plasticity' in which long-term memories are formed at a structural level in the brain as part of lifelong processes of learning.

"The most general conclusion that can be made confidently is that the brain is an extremely plastic organ, the structure of which is exquisitely sensitive to experience. A major function of the brain is thus to continuously re-organize itself, and it does so in a way that is specifically tailored to result in behavior that is adaptive in the context of the individual’s own unique environment."

Greenough went on to study the mechanisms by which such changes occur. He has carried out pioneering studies of synaptic mechanisms in the developing brain and endocrine modulation during brain development. He has integrated theories of developmental and adult learning into a unified model. According to this model, synapses are produced early in development that are experience-expectant. They are believed to incorporate environmental aspects that have been encountered reliably as the species has evolved. Such synapses have developed to collect types of information relevant to the ordinary experience of creatures of a species. In contrast, synapses developing later in life are described as experience-dependent, and are believed to form in response to experiences that result in memories.

In addition to neurons, Greenough has reported sensitivity to experience in astrocytes and vasculature, studying processes within the brain including angiogenesis, myelination, the hypertrophy of astrocytic glial cells and the astrocyte ensheathment of neurons. Another researcher describes these processes as "cellular transactions that drive coordinated structural changes in neurons, glia, and blood vessels", essential to understanding the working of long-term memory.

"Synapses when made seem to stay there for a long time in the development process," he said. "If you put an animal in a complex environment and take the animal out of it, you don't quickly take the complex environment out of the animal. There are limits, of course, but changes do stick around. Blood vessel changes, however, are very short lived. Synapses carry information that you may have had only one opportunity in life to acquire, whereas new blood vessels can be made in a few days."

By studying Fragile X syndrome, which is the most common form of intellectual disability to be genetically inherited, as well as other genetic conditions, Greenough learned about how the brain can malfunction as well as function. Studies of mice with Fragile X syndrome link the condition to the absence of the protein FMRP. Greenough's lab identifies FMRP as a regulator protein affecting between 80 and 200 other proteins in the brain.

In summary, Greenough's central contribution was the demonstration that brain development is influenced throughout life by factors such as the environment, exercise and lifelong learning. Greenough used and sometimes introduced a variety of techniques to study neuroanatomy and neural plasticity, including light microscopy, electron microscopy, electrophysiological studies and molecular approaches. Greenough's work is influential in developmental psychology, studies of brain aging and brain damage, learning and memory, neurology, psychiatry, and audiology.

== Awards and honors ==
- Fellow, American Academy of Arts and Sciences, 2006
- Fellow, American Psychological Association (APA), 1993
- Member, National Academy of Sciences, elected 1992
- Fellow, American Psychological Society (APS, now the Association for Psychological Science), 1990
- Fellow, American Association for the Advancement of Science (AAAS), 1985
- Award for Distinguished Scientific Contribution, Society for Research in Child Development, 2003
- Distinguished Scientific Contribution award, American Psychological Association, 1998/1999
- Fragile X Foundation William Rosen Award for Outstanding Research, 1998
- William James Fellow Award, Association for Psychological Science, 1996
- Oakley-Kunde Award for Excellence in Undergraduate Education, 1997
- MERIT Award, National Institute of Mental Health, 1989
- University Scholar of the University of Illinois, 1985–1988

== Death ==
Greenough suffered from Lewy body dementia and died on December 18, 2013, in Seattle, Washington.
