= Acta Psychologica =

- Discipline: Experimental psychology
- Language: English
- Edited by: Julie Aitken Schermer, Martha E. Arterberry, Colin Cooper, Martin Dempster, Tobias Greitemeyer, Michael Kaschak, Wim Notebaert, Gary Resnick

Publication details
- History: 1935−present
- Publisher: Elsevier
- Frequency: 10/year
- Open access: Yes
- License: CC BY
- Impact factor: 1.734 (2020)

Standard abbreviations
- ISO 4: Acta Psychol.

Indexing
- CODEN: APSOAZ
- ISSN: 0001-6918
- OCLC no.: 1447968

Links
- Journal homepage; Online access

Acta Psychologica is a peer-reviewed open access academic journal. Effective 1 January 2021, it became fully open access. It publishes articles in six different sections: cognition, social psychology, clinical and health psychology, language psychology, individual differences, and lifespan development. The journal was established in 1935 and is published ten times per year by Elsevier. According to the Journal Citation Reports, it has a 2020 impact factor of 1.734.
