= Coordinated Science Laboratory =

Research laboratory in Urbana, Illinois

- Coordinated Science Laboratory in 2026
- Established: 1951
- Field of research: Artificial intelligence, Circuits, Computing, Communications, Control, Robotics, Signal processing
- Director: Naresh Shanbhag
- Location: 1308 West Main Street, Urbana, Illinois, U.S. 40.1149°N 88.2267°W
- Affiliations: University of Illinois Urbana-Champaign
- Website: csl.illinois.edu

The Coordinated Science Laboratory (CSL) is a major multidisciplinary scientific research laboratory in the Grainger College of Engineering at the University of Illinois Urbana-Champaign. With deep roots in information technology, CSL has invented and deployed many landmark innovations, such as the electric vacuum gyroscope, the first computer-assisted instructional program, and the plasma screen. Today, key research areas include applied research and technology; circuits; computational and physical electronics; computer systems and architecture; decision and control; intelligent sensing, networking, and cyber-physical systems; remote sensing and space science; robotics; security and privacy; signals, inference, and networks; societal impacts of technology; and more.

== History ==
Established during the Korean War in 1951 as a classified military-research laboratory called the Control Systems Laboratory, CSL was originally intended to focus on automated control systems, with a major focus on radar. In 1959 it switched to a much broader civilian-oriented research mission and was renamed the Coordinated Science Laboratory.

== Faculty and funding ==
Research at CSL is led by about 150 faculty members spanning over 15 departments and schools at the University of Illinois Urbana-Champaign, with over 250 current graduate student researchers.

CSL receives funding from a wide range of federal, state, and private sources.

== Some major centers and institutes within or affiliated with CSL ==
- Center for Autonomy
- Center for Networked Intelligent Components and Environments (C-NICE)
- Health Care Engineering Systems Center
- Illinois Advanced Research Center at Singapore
- IBM-Illinois Discovery Accelerator Institute
- Information Trust Institute
- National Center for Professional & Research Ethics

== Notable historical research contributions ==
- Electric vacuum gyroscope (the central component of inertial navigation systems, primarily used by submarines)
- Portable radar systems
- PLATO (the first computer-based education system)
- Flat panel plasma displays
- Deuterium Method for processing microchips (extends the life of microchips by 10 to 50 times normal length)
- Quantum wire lasers
- Quantum dots

== See also ==
- Grainger College of Engineering
- Beckman Institute for Advanced Science and Technology
- Carl R. Woese Institute for Genomic Biology
- National Center for Supercomputing Applications
