= Theodore L. Brown =

American scientist (1928–2026)

- Born: October 15, 1928; Green Bay, Wisconsin, U.S.
- Died: March 24, 2026 (aged 97)
- Education: Michigan State University, Illinois Institute of Technology
- Spouse: Audrey Catherine Brockman
- Scientific career
- Fields: Inorganic chemistry
- Workplaces: Beckman Institute for Advanced Science and Technology, University of Illinois at Urbana-Champaign
- Doctoral advisor: Max T. Rogers

Theodore Lawrence Brown (October 15, 1928 – March 24, 2026) was an American scientist known for research, teaching, and writing in the field of physical inorganic chemistry, a university administrator, and a philosopher of science. In addition to his research publications, Brown has written textbooks on general chemistry and science communication which have been published in multiple languages and used in multiple countries. He was a professor emeritus at the University of Illinois at Urbana-Champaign, where he has also held the administrative positions of vice chancellor for research and dean of the graduate college (1980–1986). He was the founding director emeritus of the Beckman Institute for Advanced Science and Technology. He died at home on March 24, 2026, after a brief illness.

== Life and career ==
Theodore L. Brown was born in Green Bay, Wisconsin October 15, 1928, to Lawrence A. Brown and Martha E. (Kedinger) Brown. He earned a Bachelor of Science in chemistry at the Illinois Institute of Technology in 1950. From 1950 to 1953, he served with the U.S. Navy. On January 6, 1951, he married Audrey Catherine Brockman.

Brown then attended Michigan State University, where he worked with Max T. Rogers. He was a Du Pont Teaching Fellow, 1955–1956. He received his Ph.D. in 1956. His thesis, I. Solution Structures of Lithium Alkyl Compounds. II. Infrared Intensities of the OH Stretching Bond in Alcohols, identified two research areas that he would focus on early in his career.

He joined the faculty of the University of Illinois at Urbana-Champaign, where he became an assistant professor of chemistry in 1958, an associate professor in 1961, and a professor in 1965. His textbook Chemistry: The Central Science, initially coauthored with H. E. LeMay, has been published in fourteen editions. Between 1958 and 1993, when he retired from teaching, Brown supervised 61 Ph.D. students and 28 postdoctoral scholars. As of 1994 he became professor emeritus of chemistry at the University of Illinois.

Brown published extensively on alkyl lithium reagents in solution in the 1960s. His work in the 1970s includes contributions on metal carbonyl complexes, metal carbonyl radicals, molecular orbital theory, and Nuclear quadrupole resonance. He has researched and published extensively in the areas of inorganic chemistry, organometallic chemistry, chemical kinetics and mechanisms of reactions.

He served as the vice-chancellor for research and dean of the graduate college from 1980 to 1986. He was the founding director emeritus of the Beckman Institute for Advanced Science and Technology, University of Illinois at Urbana-Champaign, which he headed from 1987 to 1993. Brown's book Bridging divides describes the development of the institute. Brown also served as a council member of the Government-University-Industry Research Roundtable during 1989–1994. He also co-chaired a National Academies committee on Facilitating Interdisciplinary Research for the Committee on Science, Engineering and Public Policy (2003-2005). He served on the board of directors of the Arnold and Mabel Beckman Foundation during 1994–2008.

Brown's later work focuses on the cognitive, philosophical and social aspects of science. In 2003 he published the widely cited Making Truth: Metaphor in Science, exploring metaphorical reasoning in science. Imperfect Oracle: The Epistemic and Moral Authority of Science in Society, appeared in 2009. In 2018 he published a work of historical fiction, "The Beauty of their Dreams".

Brown died on March 24, 2026, at the age of 97.

== Awards and honors ==
Brown was an Alfred P. Sloan Research Fellow and a National Science Foundation Senior Postdoctoral Fellow (1965) and in 1979 was awarded a Guggenheim Fellowship. He was honored with the American Chemical Society Award for Research in Inorganic Chemistry in 1972, and with the American Chemical Society Award for Distinguished Service in the Advancement of Inorganic Chemistry in 1993. He was elected as a fellow of the American Association for the Advancement of Science in 1987 and the American Academy of Arts and Sciences in 1994. He was elected as a fellow of the American Chemical Society in 2010.
