= Beckman Fellow =

A Beckman Fellow receives funding, usually via an intermediary institution, from the Arnold and Mabel Beckman Foundation, founded by Arnold Orville Beckman and his wife Mabel. The Foundation supports programs at several institutions to encourage research, particularly the work of young researchers who might not be eligible for other sources of funding. People from a variety of different programs at different institutions may therefore be referred to as Beckman Fellows. Though most often designating postdoctoral awards in science, the exact significance of the term will vary depending on the institution involved and the type(s) of Beckman Fellowship awarded at that institution.

== Arnold and Mabel Beckman Foundation ==
=== Arnold O. Beckman Postdoctoral Fellowships ===
The Arnold O. Beckman Postdoctoral Fellowship program was sponsored by the Arnold and Mabel Beckman Foundation to support research at US institutions in the biological and chemical sciences. A total of sixty Fellowships were awarded from 2015 – 2017. After an evaluation in 2018, the Foundation then relaunched the program for 2019 as the Arnold O. Beckman Postdoctoral Fellowship in Chemical Sciences or Chemical Instrumentation. The purpose of the program is to support advanced research by postdoctoral scholars in fundamental chemistry research or the development of chemical instrumentation.

== University of Illinois Urbana-Champaign ==
=== Beckman Institute for Advanced Science and Technology ===
The Beckman Institute for Advanced Science and Technology at the University of Illinois Urbana-Champaign offers a variety of fellowship programs.

==== Beckman Graduate Fellowships ====
Beckman Graduate Fellowships are awarded to students at the University of Illinois who are working at the master's or doctorate level. Students propose interdisciplinary research projects involving at least two University of Illinois faculty members, at least one of whom is associated with the Beckman Institute. The award provides funding at the level of a 50% Graduate Research Assistantship for eleven months.

- 2023 Beckman Institute Graduate Fellows

 Siti Fauziyah
 Alexander Fliflet
 Michael Pence
 Chelsea Swartchick
 Gang Xiao
 Shensheng Zhao

- 2022 Beckman Institute Graduate Fellows

 Sohaila Aboutaleb
 Megan Finnegan
 Zhengchang Kou
 Jialu Li
 Defne Gorgun Ozgulbas
 Yunyan Sun
 Zepeng Wang

- 2021 Beckman Institute Graduate Fellows

 Evan Anderson
 Elizabeth Bello
 Bashar Emon
 Rong "Ronny" Guo
 Nil Parikh
 Amanda Weiss
 Yuxuan "Richard" Xie

==== Beckman Postdoctoral Fellows ====
Beckman Postdoctoral Fellowships are awarded to recent Ph.D.'s who receive 3-year appointments at the Beckman Institute, including both a stipend and a research budget. They must be doing interdisciplinary research in an area of research relevant to the Beckman Institute. The first Beckman postdoctoral fellows were Efrat Shimshoni (condensed matter physics) and Andrew Nobel (information theory and statistics) in 1992.

Since the founding of the original Beckman Institute Postdoctoral Fellows Program, two similar programs have been initiated: the Carle Foundation Hospital-Beckman Institute Postdoctoral Fellows Program (begun in 2008 and jointly funded by the Carle Foundation Hospital of Urbana, Illinois) and the Beckman-Brown Interdisciplinary Postdoctoral Fellowship (begun in 2015 by an endowment from the Arnold O. and Mabel M. Beckman Foundation made in honor of Theodore L. Brown, founding director of the Beckman Institute).

The following researchers are or have been Beckman Postdoctoral Fellows. The institution listed is the one from which the person had received a Ph.D. Fellowships were awarded as of the year listed.

- Kelly Powderly 2023 Beckman-Brown Interdisciplinary Postdoctoral Fellow
- Patricia Cintora 2023 Beckman Institute Postdoctoral Fellows
- Yannan Hu 2023 Beckman Institute Postdoctoral Fellows
- Zhengchang Kou 2023 Beckman Institute Postdoctoral Fellows
- Alejandro De la Cadena 2023 Cancer Center at Illinois – Beckman Institute Postdoctoral Fellows
- Zane Thornburg 2023 Cancer Center at Illinois – Beckman Institute Postdoctoral Fellows
- Eman Hamed 2022 Beckman-Brown Interdisciplinary Postdoctoral Fellow
- Chang Cao 2022 Beckman Institute Postdoctoral Fellows
- Rong (Ronny) Guo 2022 Beckman Institute Postdoctoral Fellows
- Natalia Krawczynska 2022 Beckman Institute Postdoctoral Fellows
- Matthew Lowerison 2022 Beckman Institute Postdoctoral Fellows
- Amir Ostadi Moghaddam 2022 Beckman Institute Postdoctoral Fellows
- Dema Abdelkarim 2022 Carle Foundation Hospital-Beckman Institute Fellows
- Jeanne N’Diaye (University of Toronto, 2021) Beckman-Brown Interdisciplinary Postdoctoral Fellow
- Elahe Ganji (University of Delaware, 2021)
- Babak Hemmatian Borujeni (Brown University, 2021)
- Noel Naughton (University of Illinois at Urbana-Champaign, 2021)
- Julian Cooper (MIT, 2020) Beckman-Brown Interdisciplinary Postdoctoral Fellow
- Catherine Applegate (University of Illinois at Urbana-Champaign,2020)
- Nathiya Vaithiyalingam Chandrasekaran (University of Madras, Tamilnadu, India, 2020)
- Saadia Chaudhry (Purdue University, 2020)
- Chaimongkol Saengow (Queen's University at Kingston, 2020)
- Arun Maji (Indian Institute of Technology, Bombay, 2019) Beckman-Brown Interdisciplinary Postdoctoral Fellow
- Fatemeh Ostadhossein (University of Illinois at Urbana-Champaign, 2019)
- Julie Hemmer (Ecole Centrale Nantes, France, 2019)
- Michael Jacobs (University of California, Berkeley, 2019)
- Shachi Mittal (University of Illinois at Urbana-Champaign, 2019)
- Jamila Hedhli (University of Illinois at Urbana-Champaign, 2018) Beckman-Brown Interdisciplinary Postdoctoral Fellow
- Kevin Clark (Iowa State University, 2018)
- Ryan Hubbard (University of Illinois at Urbana-Champaign, 2018)
- Matthew Moore (University of Illinois at Urbana-Champaign, 2018)
- Tian “Autumn” Qiu (University of Minnesota, 2018)
- Aaron Anderson (University of Illinois at Urbana-Champaign, 2018) Carle Foundation Hospital-Beckman Institute Postdoctoral Fellow
- Jianfeng Wang (National University of Singapore, 2018) Carle Foundation Hospital-Beckman Institute Postdoctoral Fellow
- Vivian Lau (Stanford University, 2017) Beckman-Brown Interdisciplinary Postdoctoral Fellow
- Rachel (Klaren) Bollaert (University of Illinois at Urbana-Champaign, 2017)
- Xing Jiang (UCLA, 2017)
- Michelle A. Rodrigues (Ohio State University, 2016)
- Courtney Sobieski (Washington University in St. Louis, 2016)
- Benjamin Zimmerman (University of Illinois at Urbana-Champaign, 2016)
- Lydia Kisley (Rice University, 2015) Beckman-Brown Interdisciplinary Postdoctoral Fellow
- James Checco (University of Wisconsin-Madison, 2015)
- Junlong Geng (National University of Singapore, 2015)
- Kenneth Hernandez-Burgos (Cornell University, 2015)
- Si On Yoon (University of Illinois at Urbana-Champaign, 2016)
- Yue Zhuo(University of Illinois at Urbana-Champaign, 2015)
- Ana Daugherty (Wayne State University, 2015)
- Daniel Kleinman (UCSD, 2015)
- Fan Lam (University of Illinois at Urbana-Champaign, 2015)
- Limei Tian (Washington University in St. Louis, 2015)
- Yingjie Zhang (UC Berkeley, 2015)
- Maxwell Robb (University of California, Santa Barbara, 2015)
- Jason Patrick (University of Illinois at Urbana-Champaign, 2014)
- Semin Lee (Indiana University, 2014)
- Gillian Hamilton (University of Delaware, 2014)
- Tomasz Wrobel (Jagiellonian University, 2014)
- John Biggan (University of Texas at Arlington, 2014)
- Chao Ma (University of Illinois at Urbana-Champaign, 2013)
- Preethi Jyothi (Ohio State University, 2013)
- Nathan Ward (University of Utah, 2013)
- Renee Sadowski (University of Illinois at Urbana-Champaign, 2013)
- Abhishek Singharoy (Indiana University, 2013)
- Suma Bhat (University of Illinois at Urbana-Champaign, 2012)
- Bradley Deutsch (University of Rochester, 2012)
- Sarah Erickson-Bhatt (Florida International University, 2012)
- Heather Lucas (Northwestern University, 2012)
- Jie Sun (University of Illinois at Urbana-Champaign, 2012)
- Baoxing Xu (Columbia University, 2012)
- Jonathan Fan (Harvard University, 2011)
- Kyle Mathewson (University of Illinois at Urbana-Champaign, 2011)
- Meredith Silberstein (Massachusetts Institute of Technology, 2011)
- Joseph Toscano (University of Iowa, 2011)
- Thomas van Dijk (Vrije University, 2011)
- S. Derin Babacan (Northwestern University, 2010)
- Simon Fischer-Baum (Johns Hopkins University, 2010)
- Malini Ranganathan (University of California, Berkeley, 2010)
- Ilia Solov'yov (Frankfurt University, 2010)
- Jeremy Brooks (University of California, Davis, 2009)
- Nanshu Lu (Harvard University, 2009)
- David Mayerich (Texas A&M University, 2009)
- Nathan Parks (Georgia Institute of Technology, 2009)
- Edward Wlotko (University of Illinois at Urbana-Champaign, 2009)
- Agustín Mihi (University of Seville, 2008)
- Jacob Eisenstein(Massachusetts Institute of Technology, 2008)
- Amy Shih (University of Illinois at Urbana-Champaign, 2008)
- Joel Voss(Northwestern University, 2008)
- Derek Hoiem (Carnegie Mellon University, 2007)
- Zhi Jiang (Purdue University, 2007)
- Severine Lepage (University of Líège, 2007)
- Jongseung Yoon (Massachusetts Institute of Technology, 2007)
- Joseph B. Geddes III (Pennsylvania State University, 2006)
- Yael Gertner (University of Pennsylvania, 2006)
- Ming Hsu (California Institute of Technology, 2006)
- Mark Neider (Stony Brook University, 2006)
- Stephanie Rinne (University of Illinois at Urbana-Champaign, 2006)
- Sarah Brown-Schmidt (University of Rochester, 2006)
- Dirk Bernhardt-Walther (California Institute of Technology, 2006)
- Chandramallika Basak(Syracuse University, 2005)
- Emma Falck (Helsinki University, 2005)
- Silvio Savarese (Caltech, 2005)
- Zhihong Zeng (Chinese Academy of Sciences, 2005)
- Byron McCaughey (Tulane University, 2004)
- Michelle Meade (Washington University in St. Louis, 2004)
- Timothy Nokes (University of Illinois, Chicago, 2004)
- Maxim Raginsky (Northwestern University, 2004)
- Joshua Ballard (University of Colorado, 2003)
- Richard Godijn (Vrije Universiteit, Amersterdam, 2003)
- Mathews Jacob (Swiss Federal Institute of Technology, 2003)
- Ryan Kershner (Massachusetts Institute of Technology, 2003)
- Tyler Bruns (University of Illinois at Urbana-Champaign, 2002)
- Stan Colcombe (University of Illinois at Urbana-Champaign, 2002)
- Diego Diaz (Cornell University, 2002)
- Sarah Grison (University of Wales, 2002)
- Cristina Iani (University of Bologna, 2002)
- Michael Bevan (Carnegie Mellon University, 2001)
- Donald Cannon (Pennsylvania State University, 2001)
- Christina Grozinger (Harvard University, 2001)
- Jesse Spencer-Smith (Indiana University, 2001)
- John Paul Minda (SUNY, Buffalo, 2000)
- Slava Rotkin (Ioffe Institute, Russia, 2000)
- Ilya Zharov (University of Colorado, 2000)
- Dale Barr (University of Chicago, 1999)
- Hong Hua (Beijing Institute of Technology, 1999)
- Jason McCarley (University of Louisville, 1999)
- Lolita Rotkina (Ioffe Physico-Technical Institute, 1999)
- Michal Balberg (Hebrew University of Jerusalem, 1998)
- Gregory DiGirolamo (University of Oregon, 1998)
- Brendan Frey (University of Toronto, 1997)
- Tammy Ivanco (McMaster University, 1997)
- Srinivas Akella (Carnegie Mellon University, 1996)
- Jose Jimenez (Columbia University, 1996)
- Chen Liu (Technion-Israel Institute of Technology, 1996)
- Prahlad Gupta (Carnegie Mellon University, 1995)
- Gregory Zelinsky (Brown University, 1995)
- Barbara Church (Harvard University, 1994)
- Narayan Srinivasa (University of Florida, 1994)
- Andreas Herz (Heidelberg University, 1993)
- Rajeev Sharma (University of Maryland, 1993)
- Andrew Nobel (Stanford University, 1992)
- Efrat Shimshoni (The Weizmann Institute of Science, 1992)

==== Beckman Senior Fellows ====
Beckman Senior Fellowships are awarded to senior faculty from other institutions, who come to the University of Illinois to collaborate with researchers there, usually for a short period of three to six months. Beckman Senior Fellows include:

- Luisa Ciobanu (NeuroSpin, France, 2020)
- Nelson Cowan (University of Missouri, 2017)
- Frini Karayanidis (University of Newcastle, Australia, 2016)
- Christophe Chipot (CNRS, France, 2015)
- Daniel A. King (Eastern Mennonite University, 2014)
- Kirk Erickson (University of Pittsburgh, 2013–2014)
- Lisa Frank (University of Wisconsin at Madison, 2012–2013)
- Jong Chul Ye (KAIST, 2012–2013)
- Nadja Schott (Justus-Liebig-University in Giessen, Germany, 2007)
- Dimitris C. Lagoudas (Texas Institute for Intelligent Bio-Nano Materials and Structures for Aerospace Vehicles, 2006)
- Gerald Penn (University of Toronto, 2006)
- Kevin Warwick (University of Reading, UK 2004)
- Jan Theeuews (Vrije Universiteit, Amsterdam, 2002)

=== Center for Advanced Study (CAS) ===
In addition to the Beckman Fellowships administered through the Beckman Institute for Advanced Science and Technology, the Arnold and Mabel Beckman Foundation supports additional programs through the Center for Advanced Study (CAS) at the University of Illinois at Urbana-Champaign. The CAS awards a series of Beckman Fellowships and Beckman Research Awards which support faculty at Urbana-Champaign in their research activities. These awards were funded through an endowment from Arnold and Mabel Beckman, given in the late 1970s, prior to the establishment of the Beckman Institute. They are administered separately and are awarded in departments throughout the university, not just within the sciences.

The Center for Advanced Study (CAS) has awarded Beckman Fellowships to the following University of Illinois at Urbana-Champaign faculty members, with their home department and Fellowship award year shown.

- Soon-Jo Chung (Aerospace Engineering, 2014–2015)
- Kathryn Clancy (Anthropology, 2014–2015)
- Philip Godfrey (Computer Science, 2014–2015)
- Vera Hur (Mathematics, 2014–2015)
- Charles Schroeder (Chemical & Biomolecular Engineering, 2014–2015)
- Matthew Caesar (Computer Science, 2013–2014)
- Matthew Gilbert (Electrical & Computer Engineering, 2013–2014)
- Logan Liu (Electrical & Computer Engineering, 2013–2014)
- Matthew Winters (Political Science, 2013–2014)
- Mao Ye (Finance, 2013–2014)
- Eugene Avrutin (History, 2012–2013)
- Julie L. Cidell (Geography, 2012–2013)
- Melissa Littlefield (Kinesiology, 2012–2013)
- Andrew Leakey (Plant Biology, 2011–2012)
- Manoj Prabhakaran (Computer Science, 2011–2012)
- Annie Tremblay (French, 2011–2012)
- Alexander Yong (Mathematics, 2011–2012)
- Ryan C. Bailey (Chemistry, 2010–2011)
- Steven Broglio (Kinesiology, 2010–2011)
- Todd Coleman (Electrical & Computer Engineering, 2010–2011)
- Jennifer A. Greenhill (Art History, 2010–2011)
- Anna Westerstahl Stenport (Germanic Language Literatures, 2010–2011)
- Aleksei Aksimentiev (alt. Oleksii Aksimentiev) (Physics, 2009–2010)
- Jonathan H. Ebel (Religion, 2009–2010)
- Indranil Gupta (Computer Science, 2009–2010)
- Sergiy Merenkov (Mathematics, 2009–2010)
- Heather Hyde Minor (Architecture, 2009–2010)
- Dan Shao (East Asian Language & Cultures, 2009–2010)
- Smitha Vishveshwara (Physics, 2009–2010)
- Behrooz Ghamari-Tabrizi (History, 2008–2009)
- Ping Ma (Statistics, 2008–009)
- Ruby Mendenhall (Sociology, 2008–2009)
- Charles C. Roseman (Anthropology, 2008–2009)
- Rebecca Stumpf (Anthropology, 2008–2009)
- Eyal Amir (Computer Science, 2007–2008)
- Paul J. A. Kenis (Chemical Engineering, 2007–2008)
- Christopher Jay Leininger (Mathematics, 2007–2008)
- Benjamin McCall (Chemistry, 2007–2008)
- Thomas A. Nevins (Mathematics, 2007–008)
- Michelle Shumate (Communication, 2007–2008)
- Brian L. DeMarco (Physics, 2006–2007)
- Minh N. Do (Electrical & Computer Engineering, 2006–2007)
- Clarence E. Lang (African American Studies, 2006–2007)
- Christian Edward Sandvig (Communication, 2006–2007)
- M. Christina White (Chemistry, 2006–2007)
- Chad Rienstra (Chemistry, 2005–2006)
- Glenn Ian Roisman (Psychology, 2005–2006)
- Valeria Sobol (Slavic Languages and Literatures, 2005–2006)
- Huimin Zhao (Chemical Engineering, 2005–2006)
- Daniel Wayne Pack (Chemical Engineering, 2004–2005)
- Scott K. Silverman (Chemistry, 2004–2005)
- Benjamin D. Wandelt (Physics, 2004–2005)
- Gauri Bhattacharya (Social Work, 2003–2004)
- Zsuzsa Gille (Sociology, 2003–2004)
- Mary S. Gin (Chemistry, 2003–2004)
- Taekjip Ha (Physics, 2003–2004)
- Eberhard F. Morgenroth (Civil & Environmental Engineering, 2003–2004)
- Wanda Sue Pillow (Educational Policy, 2003–2004)
- Matthew A. Ando (Mathematics, 2002–2003)
- Charles Forbes Gammie (Astronomy, 2002–2003)
- Youssef M. A. Hashash (Civil & Environmental Engineering, 2002–2003)
- Neil L. Kelleher (Chemistry, 2002–2003)
- Ruth Aguilera (Business Administration, 2001–2002)
- Karin Dahmen (Physics, 2001–2002)
- Wilfred A. Van Der Donk (Chemistry, 2000–2001)
- Paul R. Selvin (Physics, 1999–2000)
- Zhi-Pei Liang (Electrical & Computer Engineering, 1997–1998)
- Yi Lu (Chemistry, 1996–1997)
- Martin Gruebele (Chemistry, 1995–1996)
- Sergei V. Ivanov (Mathematics, 1995–1996)
- Steven B. Bradlow (Mathematics, 1994–1995)
- Nancy Makri (Chemistry, 1993–1994)
- Mark E. Nelson (Molecular & Integrative Physiology, 1993–1994)
- Jonathan V. Sweedler (Chemistry, 1993–1994)
- Pravin M. Vaidya (Computer Science, 1991–1992)
- Douglas A. Kibbee (Literatures, Cultures and Linguistics, 1990–1991)
- Todd Martinez (Chemistry, 1990–2000)
- Raymond E. Zielinski (Plant Biology, 1990–1991)

== Stanford University ==
=== Beckman Center for Molecular and Genetic Medicine ===
The Beckman Center for Molecular and Genetic Medicine in the Stanford School of Medicine was funded in part by $12 million from the Arnold and Mabel Beckman Foundation, approximately one-fifth of the costs for the new center. It opened in May 1989. The Beckman Fellows program was established in 1999 to support young researchers. Recipients include:

- Susanna Mlynarczyk-Evans (2008–2011)
- Sheila Jaswal (2003–2006)
- Zach Serber (2003–2006)
- Frederic Charron (2002–2005)
- Kevin Travers (2002–2005)
- Michael Galko (2001–2004)

== California Institute of Technology ==
=== Beckman Institute at Caltech ===
In 2000, the Beckman Institute at Caltech received a grant from the Beckman Foundation to support Beckman Postgraduate Fellowships for five years. Fellowships were for a three-year period. The following people have been recipients:

- Lacramioara Bintu (2011–2014)
- Daniel Kim (2010–2013)
- Chris Richards (2010–2013)
- Bryce Sadtler (2010–2013)
- Jacob Waldbauer (2010–2013)
- Jeremiah Johnson (2009–2012)
- Ali Mortazavi (2009–2012)
- Casimir Wierzynski (2009–2012)
- Brad Olsen (2008–2010)
- Todd Anthony (2008–2011)
- Jesse Bloom (2008–2011)
- Rosemary Conrad (2008–2011)
- Eric Toberer (2007–2010)
- Ingmar Riedel-Kruse (2007–2010)
- Long Cai (2006–2009)
- Chris Gandhi (2006–2009)
- Jordan Gerton (2003–2005)
- Jennifer Lee (2003–2006)
- Rich Olson (2003–2006)
- Michael Diehl (2002–2005)
- Achilleas Frangakis (2002–2004)
- Cora MacBeth (2002–2005)
- Arash Komeili (2001–2004)
- Paul W. K. Rothemund (2001–2004)

== University of California, Irvine ==
=== Gavin Herbert Eye Institute ===
The Arnold and Mabel Beckman Foundation supported construction of The Gavin Herbert Eye Institute at the University of California, Irvine School of Medicine. The facility is designed specifically for ease of use by low-vision patients. The institute opened in 2013, and as of Feb. 12, 2013, was awarded a grant for fellowships by the Beckman Foundation.
