= Gerald Penn =

Gerald Penn may refer to:

- Gerald Penn (computer scientist)
- Gerald Penn (immunologist)
