= M. Christina White =

Greek-American chemist

- Born: Athens, Greece
- Other name: Marie Christina White
- Education: Smith College, Johns Hopkins University
- Spouse: Martin D. Burke
- Awards: Fellow of the Royal Society of Chemistry 2014, American Association for the Advancement of Science Fellow 2012, Cope Scholar Award 2009, AstraZeneca Excellence in Chemistry Award 2008, Camille Dreyfus Teacher Scholar Award 2008, Boehringer Ingelheim Pharmaceuticals New Investigator Award 2008, Pfizer Award for Creativity in Organic Chemistry 2008, Eli Lilly Grantee Award 2007, NSF CAREER Award 2006-2010
- Scientific career
- Fields: Organometallic chemistry
- Workplaces: University of Illinois at Urbana-Champaign
- Thesis: (1998)
- Doctoral advisor: Gary H. Posner
- Other academic advisors: Eric Jacobsen
- Notable students: Abigail Doyle

M. Christina White is a professor of chemistry at the University of Illinois at Urbana-Champaign. Her research in the field of organometallic catalysis focuses on developing highly selective carbon–hydrogen bond activation methods to streamline the process of complex molecule synthesis.

== Education ==
White received a B.A. degree with highest honors in biochemistry from Smith College in 1992, where she worked with Stuart Rosenfeld in the area of host–guest chemistry. From 1992 to 1993, she worked in the biology graduate program at Johns Hopkins University with Christian Anfinsen on thermophilic bacteria protein folding. In December 1998, she earned her PhD in organic chemistry from Johns Hopkins University as an ACS Medicinal Chemistry Pre-Doctoral fellow, working with Gary H. Posner. Her doctoral research involved synthesis of hybrid vitamin D_{3} analogs.

== Career ==
In 1999, White joined Eric Jacobsen's labs at Harvard University as an NIH postdoctoral fellow. During this time, she developed the first synthetically useful methane monooxygenase (MMO) mimic system for catalytic epoxidations with hydrogen peroxide. In July 2002, White joined the Harvard University chemistry department as a faculty member. In 2005, she moved to Illinois, where she currently works at the University of Illinois at Urbana-Champaign as a professor of chemistry, researching C–H bond activation. White's notable students include Abigail Doyle, of Princeton University.

== Research ==
White and her team aim to study and develop selective allylic and aliphatic C-H oxidation reactions for use in organic synthesis. White has contributed novel palladium / sulfoxide and iron catalysts that functionalize C-H bonds selectively, predictively, and without the need for directing groups. Her palladium / sulfoxide catalyst is referred to as the White Catalyst, and her iron catalyst, Fe(PDP)(MeCN)_{2}(SbF_{6})_{2}, is referred to as the White-Chen catalyst; both catalysts are commercially available. Recent research in the White lab includes designing reactions for effecting non-directed, remote aliphatic C-H hydroxylation of simple amide-containing molecules. White has also applied these catalysts and their derivatives to new applications, with the most recent being the White catalyst's dehydrogenative Diels-Alder reaction and the iron-mediated intramolecular C-H amination reaction.

== Awards and recognition ==
- Alumni Scholar University of Illinois Department of Chemistry 2017
- Mukaiyama Award 2016, Fellow of the Royal Society of Chemistry 2014
- American Association for the Advancement of Science Fellow 2012
- Arthur C. Cope Scholar Award 2009, Roche Excellence in Chemistry Award 2009
- Abbot Young Investigator Award 2008
- AstraZeneca Excellence in Chemistry Award 2008
- Camille Dreyfus Teacher Scholar Award 2008
- Boehringer Ingelheim Pharmaceuticals New Investigator Award 2008
- Amgen Young Investigator Award 2008
- Sanofi Aventis "Visions in Chemistry" 2008
- Pfizer Award for Creativity in Organic Chemistry 2008
- Eli Lilly Grantee Award 2007
- Beckman Fellow, 2006-2007
- NSF CAREER Award 2006-2010
