= Elizabeth Rhoades =

American biophysicist

Anna Elizabeth Rhoades is a molecular biophysicist at University of Pennsylvania. She is known for pioneering studies of protein folding using single-molecule techniques.

== Education ==
Rhoades received her undergraduate education at Duke University, followed by Ph.D. studies at the University of Michigan, Ann Arbor in biophysics. Her dissertation supervisor was Ari Gafni.

She performed postdoctoral research in the laboratory of Gilad Haran at the Weizmann Institute in Rehovot, Israel. While at the Weizmann Institute, Rhoades was involved in revolutionary single-molecule experiments studying the folding and unfolding of immobilized proteins. Rhoades completed her postdoctoral research with Watt W. Webb at Cornell University, one of the co-inventors of fluorescence correlation spectroscopy.

== Research ==
Rhoades studies intrinsically disordered proteins and amyloidogenic proteins involved in Parkinson's disease, Alzheimer's disease and Type-II diabetes.

Research in the Rhoades lab aims to elucidate the principles that link protein conformational change with structure-function relationships, focusing on understanding structural plasticity in intrinsically disordered proteins. These proteins do not form stable structures under physiological conditions; for many, function is dependent upon disorder. This is in striking contrast to the structure-function paradigm that dominates our understanding of globular proteins. Given the large fraction of the eukaryotic proteome predicted to be disordered, the scope of the problem and the need for new insights are enormous.

== Awards ==
- 2019 Michael and Kate Bárány Award for "outstanding experimental abilities, parsimonious interpretation and deep insights into structure-function relations in disordered systems"
