= Michael and Kate Bárány Award =

- Awarded for: “outstanding contribution to biophysics by a person who has not achieved the rank of full professor”
- Sponsored by: Biophysical Society
- Location: Rockville, Maryland
- Country: United States
- Reward: $2,000
- First award: 1992
- Website: www.biophysics.org/awards-funding/society-awards

The Michael and Kate Bárány Award for Young Investigators from the Biophysical Society in Rockville, Maryland, "recognizes an outstanding contribution to biophysics by a person who has not achieved the rank of full professor." The award was established in 1992 as the Young Investigator Award and renamed in 1998, when it was endowed by Michael Bárány and Kate Bárány. The Báránys were survivors of The Holocaust who went on to become leading researchers in muscle contraction.

== Michael and Kate Bárány Award Laureates ==
As of 2025, laureates of the award have included:

- 2025: Hernan G. Garcia
- 2024: Julia Mahamid
- 2023: Jeanne C. Stachowiak
- 2022: Suckjoon Jun
- 2021: Tanja Mittag
- 2020: Clifford Brangwynne
- 2019: Elizabeth Rhoades
- 2018: Bianxiao Cui
- 2017: Ahmet Yildiz
- 2016: Olga Boudker
- 2015: Sarah Teichmann
- 2014: Miriam Goodman
- 2013: Patricia Clark
- 2012: Vijay S. Pande
- 2011: Charalampos Kalodimos
- 2010: Mark J. Schnitzer
- 2009: Gaudenz M. Danuser
- 2008: Sergei I. Sukharev
- 2007: Taekjip Ha
- 2006: Anne-Frances Miller
- 2005: Vincent Hilser
- 2004: Paul R. Selvin
- 2003: Patricia Jennings
- 2002: William Zagotta
- 2001: Shimon Weiss
- 2000: Elizabeth A. Komives
- 1999: Gaetano T. Montelione
- 1998: Winfried Denk
- 1997: Donald W. Hilgemann
- 1996: David P. Corey
- 1995: Roderick MacKinnon
- 1994: Steven Block
- 1993: Ronald Vale
- 1992: Richard W. Aldrich
