= Multiple Michael/aldol reaction =

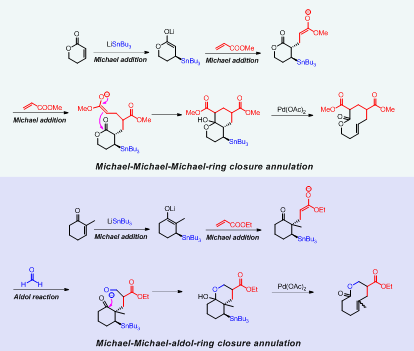
Multiple Michael/aldol reaction for construction of macrolide structures

Multiple Michael/aldol reaction (or domino Michael/aldol reaction) is a consecutive series of reactions composed of either Michael addition reactions or aldol reactions. More than two steps of reaction are usually involved. This reaction has been used for synthesis of large macrocyclic or polycyclic ring structures.

Gary Posner and co-workers were the first to report using multiple Michael/aldol reactions to construct macrolide structures. Their method utilized a Michael-Michael-Michael-ring closure (MIMI-MIRC) or a Michael-Michael-aldol-ring closure annulation sequences to assemble acrylates and/or aldehydes together to form substituted 9-, 10-, and 11-membered macrolide structures. Besides synthesis of complex ring structures, multiple Michael/aldol reaction can also be used for rapid production of complex compound libraries.

Aldolases have been used to mediate multiple aldol reactions. Chi-Huey Wong and co-workers had shown that 2-deoxyribose-5-phosphate aldolase and fructose-1, 6-diphosphate aldolase could be used together in a one-pot reaction to connect two aldehydes and one ketone together through sequential aldol reactions. This reaction could be used to generate a variety of carbohydrate derivatives.

== See also ==
- Robinson annulation, a classic reaction involving a Michael addition followed by an aldol condensation
