= Abdelrahman Mohamed =

Abdelrahman Mohamed may refer to:

- Abdelrahman El-Sayed (Abdelrahman Mohamed El-Sayed), Egyptian weightlifter
- Abdelrahman Mohamed (handballer), Egyptian handball player
- Abdelrahman Mohamed (AI researcher), Egyptian-American computer scientist
