= Scott Silverman =

Scott Silverman may refer to:

- Scott J. Silverman (born 1957), American lawyer and judge
- Scott K. Silverman, professor of chemistry
