= Beckman Institute =

Beckman Institute may refer to any of five research centers founded by the Arnold and Mabel Beckman Foundation in the 1980s:

- Beckman Center for Molecular and Genetic Medicine, Stanford University, Stanford, California
- Beckman Institute at Caltech, California Institute of Technology, Pasadena, California
- Beckman Institute for Advanced Science and Technology, University of Illinois, Urbana, Illinois
- Beckman Laser Institute, University of California, Irvine, Irvine, California
- Beckman Research Institute, City of Hope National Medical Center, Duarte, California
