= Jonathan V. Sweedler =

American chemist

- Born: New York, New York, United States
- Education: University of Arizona; Stanford University; University of California, Davis
- Awards: Beckman Fellow (1993-1994); Pittsburgh Analytical Chemistry Award (2007); Alfred P. Sloan Research Fellow (1995); Ralph N. Adams Award, The Pittsburgh Conference (2012); Fellow of American Chemical Society (2011); Fellow of American Association for the Advancement of Science 2001
- Scientific career
- Fields: Chemistry, analytical chemistry, physical chemistry, chemical biology, biophysics, physiology, and neuroscience
- Workplaces: University of Illinois at Urbana–Champaign
- Doctoral advisor: M. Bonner Denton

Jonathan V Sweedler (born 1961) is an American chemist specializing in bioanalytical chemistry, neurochemistry and cell to cell biology and behavior. He is the James R. Eiszner Family Endowed Chair in Chemistry at the University of Illinois at Urbana-Champaign. Additionally, he holds a faculty appointment in the Beckman Institute. Sweedler is a Fellow of the American Academy of Arts and Sciences, and a Fellow of the Royal Society of Chemistry. He is also an Elected Fellow of the American Chemical Society, for which he acts as the Editor in Chief of the journal Analytical Chemistry.

He previously served as director of the School of Chemical Sciences at UIUC, and as director of the Roy J. Carver Biotechnology Center (University of Illinois), where he was involved in the genome sequencing of several organisms. Currently his laboratory has facilities in the Beckman Institute for Advanced Science and Technology and the Carl R. Woese Institute for Genomic Biology at the University of Illinois. His research has led to the discovery of several mammalian neuropeptides.

Serving as the chair of dissertation committees at the University of Illinois, he has graduated approximately 60 students with PhD degrees. As of 2019 his publication record includes over 400 journal articles, with an h-index estimated to be in the 60s or 70s.

== Education ==
He graduated with a B.S. in chemistry from the University of California, Davis in 1983 and a PhD from the University of Arizona in 1989. Thereafter, he was an NSF Postdoctoral Fellow at Stanford University with Richard Zare (chemist) and Richard Scheller (neuroscientist) before joining the faculty at the University of Illinois in 1991.

== Publications ==
- Jansson, Erik T.; Comi, Troy J.; Rubakhin, Stanislav S.; Sweedler, Jonathan V. (July 29, 2016). "Single Cell Peptide Heterogeneity of Rat Islets of Langerhans". ACS Chemical Biology. 11 (9). American Chemical Society (ACS): 2588–2595. doi:10.1021/acschembio.6b00602. ISSN 1554-8929. PMC 5104495. PMID 27414158.
- Aerts, Jordan T.; Louis, Kathleen R.; Crandall, Shane R.; Govindaiah, Gubbi; Cox, Charles L.; Sweedler, Jonathan V. (March 6, 2014). "Patch Clamp Electrophysiology and Capillary Electrophoresis–Mass Spectrometry Metabolomics for Single Cell Characterization". Analytical Chemistry. 86 (6). American Chemical Society (ACS): 3203–3208. doi:10.1021/ac500168d. ISSN 0003-2700. PMC 3964733. PMID 24559180.
- Wang, Tongfei A.; Yu, Yanxun V.; Govindaiah, Gubbi; Ye, Xiaoying; Artinian, Liana; Coleman, Todd P.; Sweedler, Jonathan V.; Cox, Charles L.; Gillette, Martha U. (August 17, 2012). "Circadian Rhythm of Redox State Regulates Excitability in Suprachiasmatic Nucleus Neurons". Science. 337 (6096). American Association for the Advancement of Science (AAAS): 839–842. Bibcode:2012Sci...337..839W. doi:10.1126/science.1222826. ISSN 0036-8075. PMC 3490628. PMID 22859819.
- Hummon, Amanda B.; Richmond, Timothy A.; Verleyen, Peter; Baggerman, Geert; Huybrechts, Jurgen; Ewing, Michael A.; Vierstraete, Evy; Rodriguez-Zas, Sandra L.; Schoofs, Liliane; Robinson, Gene E.; Sweedler, Jonathan V. (October 27, 2006). "From the Genome to the Proteome: Uncovering Peptides in the Apis Brain". Science. 314 (5799). American Association for the Advancement of Science (AAAS): 647–649. Bibcode:2006Sci...314..647H. doi:10.1126/science.1124128. ISSN 0036-8075. PMID 17068263. S2CID 9341296.
- Rubakhin, Stanislav S.; Garden, Rebecca W.; Fuller, Robert R.; Sweedler, Jonathan V. (2000). "Measuring the peptides in individual organelles with mass spectrometry". Nature Biotechnology. 18 (2). Springer Science and Business Media LLC: 172–175. doi:10.1038/72622. ISSN 1087-0156. PMID 10657123. S2CID 6742358.
