= E. W. Beth Dissertation Prize =

The Association for Logic, Language and Information (FoLLI) each year awards the E. W. Beth Dissertation Prize, named in honor of the Dutch mathematician Evert Willem Beth, to outstanding PhD theses in the fields of Logic, Language, and Information. Dissertations are evaluated on the basis of their technical depth, strength and originality. Each year the award can be assigned ex aequo to more than one thesis, or to no thesis at all. The prize consists of a certificate, a monetary award, and an invitation to submit (a possibly revised version of) the thesis to the FoLLI Publications on Logic, Language and Information, published by Springer Science+Business Media.

== List of previous winners ==
Year	Author	Title of the Thesis	Institution
2026	Adrienne Lancelot	Comparing functional programs, or how to put λ-terms back in order	Institut polytechnique de Paris
2026	Keya Prakash	History-Deterministic Parity Automata: Games, Complexity and the 2-Token Theorem	University of Warwick
2025	Guillaume Massas	Duality and Infinity: Studies in Possibility Semantics and Semiconstructive Mathematics	University of California at Berkeley
2024	Aliaume Lopez	First Order Preservation Theorems in Finite Model Theory: Locality, Topology, and Limit Constructions	École Normale Supérieure Paris-Saclay
2024	Konstantinos Kogkalidis	Dependency as Modality, Parsing as Permutation. A Neurosymbolic Perspective on Categorial Grammars	Utrecht University
2023	Gabriele Vanoni	On Reasonable Space and Time Cost Models for the λ-Calculus	Università di Bologna
2022	Alexander Bentkamp	Superposition for Higher Order Logic	Vrije Universiteit Amsterdam
2021	Ilaria Canavotto	Where Responsibility Takes You	Universiteit van Amsterdam
2021	Martin Lück	Team Logic: Axioms, Expressiveness, Complexity	Leibniz Universität Hannover
2020	Juan Aguilera	Between the Finite and the Infinite	Technische Universität Wien
2020	Marcin Wągiel	Subatomic Quantification	Masarykova Univerzita
2019	Bartosz Wcisło	Understanding the strength of compositional truth	Uniwersytet Warszawski
2018	İsmail İlkan Ceylan	Query Answering in Probabilistic Data and Knowledge Bases	Technical University of Dresden
2017	Antoine Amarilli	Leveraging the structure of uncertain data	Télécom ParisTech
2017	Ronald de Haan	Parameterized Complexity in the Polynomial Hierarchy	Technical University of Vienna
2016	Thomas Zeume	Small Dynamic Complexity Classes	University of Dortmund
2015	Michał Skrzypczak	Descriptive set theoretic methods in automata theory	Uniwersytet Warszawski
2014	Thomas Graf	Local and Transderivational Constraints in Syntax and Semantics	University of California, Los Angeles
2013	Wesley H. Holliday	Knowing What Follows: Epistemic Closure and Epistemic Logic	Stanford University
2013	Ekaterina Lebedeva	Expressing Discourse Dynamics via Continuations	University of Lorraine
2012	Andreas Kapsner	Logics and Falsifications	University of Barcelona
2012	Daniel R. Licata	Dependently Typed Programming with Domain-Specific Logics	Carnegie Mellon University
2011	Nils Bulling	Modelling and Verifying Abilities of Rational Agents	Clausthal University of Technology
2011	Mohan Ganesalingam	The Language of Mathematics	University of Cambridge
2010	Yury Savateev	Algorithmic Complexity of Fragments of the Lambek Calculus	Moscow State University
2009	Emmanuel Chemla	Presuppositions and Scalar Implicatures: Formal and Experimental Studies	École Normale Supérieure de Paris
2009	Lukasz Kaiser	Logic and Games on Automatic Structures	RWTH Aachen
2008	Tomas Brazdil	Verification of Probabilistic Recursive Sequential Programs	Masaryk University
2008	Marco Kuhlmann	Dependency Structures and Lexicalized Grammars	Universität des Saarlandes
2007	Gabriele Puppis	Automata for Branching and Layered Structures	University of Udine
2006	Leszek Kołodziejczyk	Truth Definitions and higher-Order Logics in Finite Models	Uniwersytet Warszawski
2006	Chung-chieh (Ken) Shan	Linguistic Side Effects	Harvard University
2005	Ash Asudeh	Resumption as Resource Management	University of Canterbury
2004	John T. Hale	Grammar, Uncertainty and Sentence Processing	Michigan State University
2003	Jason Baldridge	Lexically Specified Derivational Control in Combinatory Categorial Grammar	University of Edinburgh
2002	Maria Aloni	Quantification under conceptual covers	University of Amsterdam
2001	Gerald Penn	The Algebraic Structure of Attributed Type Signatures	University of Toronto
2000	Jelle Gerbrandy	Bisimulations on Planet Kripke	University of Amsterdam
2000	Khalil Sima'an	Learning Efficient Disambiguation	Universities of Amsterdam and Utrecht
1999	Peter Grünwald	The Minimum Description Length Principle and Reasoning under Uncertainty	University of Amsterdam
1999	Matthew Stone	Modality in Dialogue: Planning, Pragmatics and Computation	University of Pennsylvania
1998	Nir Friedman	Modeling Beliefs in Dynamic Systems	Stanford University
1998	Lisa Matthewson	Determiner Systems and Quantificational Strategies: Evidence from Salish	University of British Columbia

== See also ==
- List of mathematics awards
