= Martin D. Burke =

American organic chemist

- Born: February 5, 1976 (age 50); Westminster, Maryland
- Education: Harvard University Ph.D. (2003), M.D. (2005); Johns Hopkins University B.A. (1998)
- Awards: Beckman Young Investigators Award; Nobel Laureate Signature Award
- Scientific career
- Fields: Organic Chemistry
- Workplaces: University of Illinois at Urbana–Champaign
- Thesis: A synthesis strategy for generating diverse skeletons of small molecules combinatorially (2004)
- Doctoral advisor: Stuart L. Schreiber
- Other academic advisors: Henry Brem and Gary H. Posner
- Website: www.chemistry.illinois.edu/faculty/Martin_Burke.html

Martin D. Burke (born February 5, 1976, in Westminster, Maryland) is the May and Ving Lee Professor for Chemical Innovation at the University of Illinois at Urbana–Champaign, and founding Director of the Molecule Maker Lab. Burke pioneered blocc chemistry – iterative carbon-carbon bond formation that is friendly to automation, AI, and non-specialists. His group developed MIDA and TIDA boronates, enabling iterative C-C bond formation, universal purification, and automation-friendly synthesis. These discoveries have powered the discovery of many new drugs and materials and helped enable the integration of AI and small molecule science. Burke is an elected member of the National Academy of Medicine.

== Early life and education ==
Burke was born on February 5, 1976, in Westminster, Maryland. Burke studied chemistry as an undergraduate at Johns Hopkins University, graduating in 1998 with his B.A. in Chemistry. While an undergraduate, he was a Howard Hughes Medical Institute Undergraduate Research Fellow, and he conducted research with Professors Henry Brem and Gary H. Posner on derivatives of calcitriol as potential drug candidates. Burke went on to Harvard University, where he earned a Ph.D. in 2003, and Harvard Medical School and Massachusetts Institute of Technology, where he earned an M.D. in 2005. Burke conducted his Ph.D. thesis work with Professor Stuart L. Schreiber on the combinatorial synthesis of small molecules with diverse skeletons.

== Independent career ==
He joined the Department of Chemistry in 2005 as an Assistant Professor, was promoted to Associate Professor in 2011, then to full Professor in 2014. He was appointed Associate Dean of Research of the Carle-Illinois College of Medicine in 2018. In response to the COVID-19 Pandemic, Burke was appointed to lead the University of Illinois' SHIELD initiative to protect the community with testing. A collaborative effort between Burke and Paul J. Hergenrother lead to the development of a saliva test called covidSHIELD for COVID-19 that has been used over 1 million times in the campus community.

== Research ==
Burke's research is divided into three segments, Blocc Chemistry, Molecular Prosthetics, and Antifungals. Blocc chemistry involves the use of "boron-protected haloboronic acids" to iteratively cross-couple building blocks into complex molecules. This work culminated into a paper in the journal Science. Work in this area is ongoing and has begun to include a focus on Csp^{3} cross-coupling to expand the value of the automated process. Molecular prosthetics is the study of small organic molecules that restore function of aberrant or missing proteins in biology. Burke has reported on two molecular prosthetics in detail including Hinokitiol and Amphotericin B. Hitokitiol restores iron transport as well as other metals, acting as a prosthetic for passive metal transporters as reported in Science. Amphotericin B assembles into small pores to allow bicarbonate across endothelial cells which shows promise in treatment of cystic fibrosis Amphotericin B is also involved in the antifungal finger of the Burke's research. His group discovered that the analog "C2’deOAmB" is able to kill fungal cells by binding ergosterol but not cholesterol.

== Recognition ==
Burke is an elected member of the National Academy of Medicine and the American Society for Clinical Investigation, and is a Fellow of the American Association for the Advancement of Science. He was named a Beckman Foundation Young Investigator in 2008. In 2013 the American Chemical Society gave him their Elias J. Corey Award for Outstanding Original Contribution in Organic Synthesis by a Young Investigator, and in 2017 they awarded Burke their Nobel Laureate Signature Award for Graduate Education in Chemistry (along with then graduate student Junqi Li). In 2021 Burke was awarded the Presidential Medallion from the University of Illinois
