= Taekjip Ha =

South Korean-born American biophysicist (born 1968)

- Born: February 20, 1968 (age 58); Seoul, South Korea
- Citizenship: American
- Education: University of California, Berkeley, Seoul National University, Stanford University
- Awards: Beckman Fellow (2003–2004); National Academy of Sciences Member (2015); Ho-Am Prize in Science (2011); Searle Scholars Program; Sloan Fellowship; Bárány Award Cottrell Scholar
- Scientific career
- Fields: Physics, biophysics, computational biology
- Workplaces: Harvard University (Since 2023); Johns Hopkins University (2015–2023); University of Illinois at Urbana Champaign (2000–2015)
- Academic advisors: Raymond Jeanloz, Daniel Chemla, Shimon Weiss, Steven Chu

Korean name
- Hangul: 하택집
- Hanja: 河擇輯
- RR: Ha Taekjip
- MR: Ha T'aekchip
- Website: Group Website; Johns Hopkins University Faculty Page

Taekjip Ha (born February 20, 1968) is a South Korean-born American biophysicist who is currently a Senior investigator and director of Program in Cellular and Molecular Medicine at Boston Children's Hospital and Professor of Pediatrics, Harvard Medical School. He was previously Bloomberg Distinguished Professor of Biophysics and Biomedical Engineering at Johns Hopkins University. He was previously the Gutgsell Professor of Physics, at University of Illinois at Urbana-Champaign where he was the principal investigator of Single Molecule Nanometry group. He is also a Howard Hughes Medical Institute investigator.

== Biography ==
Ha was born in Seoul, South Korea on February 20, 1968.

He received a B.S. degree in physics at Seoul National University in 1990, and joined the physics department at University of California, Berkeley where he began to study atomic physics in the lab of Raymond Jeanloz in Berkeley's geophysics department. He worked on a project to place nitrogen and carbon under very high pressures, with the goal to create a material harder than diamonds. During this time, he had to take a temporary leave of absence from Berkeley to South Korea for a year to fulfill South Korea's military service requirements. Upon his return, Ha changed his research interests and joined the lab of Daniel Chemla, a prominent scientist known for his studies of quantum optics of semiconductors. Soon after joining Chemla's group, Ha began working closely with scientist Shimon Weiss to build a near-field scanning optical microscope, a machine equipped with a small aperture and a short-pulse laser able to measure a material's properties with high time and spatial resolution. He subsequently received both his M.A. and Ph.D. at Berkeley and completed postdoctoral research at Lawrence Berkeley National Laboratory and Stanford University with advisor Steven Chu. He was appointed to the faculty of the University of Illinois in 2000 as assistant professor in the Department of Physics and Center for Biophysics and Computational Biology.

In July 2015, it was announced that Ha would move to Johns Hopkins University as a Bloomberg Distinguished Professor. The Bloomberg Distinguished Professorship program was established in 2013, by a gift from Michael Bloomberg to recruit faculty with considerable accomplishments as interdisciplinary researchers and in excellence in teaching. Ha holds joint appointments in the Johns Hopkins School of Medicine's department of Biophysics and Biophysical Chemistry, the Zanvyl Krieger School of Arts and Sciences's Department of Biophysics, the Whiting School of Engineering's Department of Biomedical Engineering. Through the Bloomberg Distinguished Professorship, Ha will be teaching a new undergraduate interdisciplinary biophysics course and will be engaged in the university's Individualized Health Initiative.

In 2021, Ha was elected President-elect of the Biophysical Society. He will assume the office of President-elect in 2022 and begin his term as President in 2023.

=== Honors and Distinctions ===
Ha has been recognized internationally for his pioneering work in biophysics. In 2001, he was named a Searle Scholar, recognizing him as an "exceptional young scientist." The following year, he received a National Science Foundation CAREER Award and a Fluorescence Young Investigator Award from the Biophysical Society. In 2003, he was named a Cottrell Scholar for his "high-quality research" and "dedication to the task of teaching undergraduates" and an Alfred P. Sloan Foundation Fellow for "outstanding promise." In 2005, Ha was elected to the American Physical Society and was named an Investigator of the Howard Hughes Medical Institute in the scientific disciplines of Biophysics and Structural Biology, a position he continues to hold today. He received the Michael and Kate Bárány Award of the Biophysical Society in 2007 for "his development and application of novel single molecule physical methods and techniques, and for his ground-breaking discoveries in the single molecule research field." In 2011, Ha won the Ho-Am Prize in Science for his "pioneering application of fluorescence resonance energy transfer techniques to reveal the behavior and physical characteristics of single biomolecules"; this prize is "widely regarded as the Korean equivalent of the Nobel Prizes." He was named the 2012 Scientist of the Year by the Korean-American Scientists and Engineers Association (KSEA) and Korean Federation of Science and Technology Societies (KOFST).

In 2015, Taekjip Ha was elected to both the National Academy of Sciences and American Academy of Arts and Sciences. In 2021, he was elected as a member of the National Academy of Medicine.

== Research ==
Taekjip Ha uses sophisticated physical techniques to manipulate and visualize the movements of single molecules to understand basic biological processes involving DNA and other molecules. He applies the use of single-molecule techniques and has pioneered several techniques in studying biological systems usually supported by nano-mechanical tools such as optical tweezers. Combining biophysical manipulation techniques and ultrasensitive fluorescence imaging to manipulate protein, RNA, and DNA molecules and observe their responses, Ha tests various protein-DNA and protein-protein interactions at extremely high spatial and temporal resolutions.

== Publications ==
Ha has more than 37,000 citations in Google Scholar and an h-index of 103.

Selected Publications

- 2003 with A Yildiz, JN Forkey, SA McKinney, YE Goldman, PR Selvin, Myosin V walks hand-over-hand: single fluorophore imaging with 1.5-nm localization, in: Science. Vol. 300, nº 5628; 2061-2065.
- 2008 with R Roy, S Hohng, A practical guide to single-molecule FRET, in: Nature Methods. Vol. 5, nº 6; 507-516.
- 1996 with T Enderle, DF Ogletree, DS Chemla, PR Selvin, S Weiss, Probing the interaction between two single molecules: fluorescence resonance energy transfer between a single donor and a single acceptor, in: Proceedings of the National Academy of Sciences. Vol. 93, nº 13; 6264-6268.
- 2010 with C Grashoff, BD Hoffman, MD Brenner, R Zhou, M Parsons, MT Yang, et al, Measuring mechanical tension across vinculin reveals regulation of focal adhesion dynamics, in: Nature. Vol. 466, nº 7303; 263-266.
- 2000 with X Zhuang, LE Bartley, HP Babcock, R Russell, D Herschlag, S Chu, A single-molecule study of RNA catalysis and folding, in: Science. Vol. 288, nº 5473; 2048-2051.
- 2008 with C Joo, H Balci, Y Ishitsuka, C Buranachai, Advances in single-molecule fluorescence methods for molecular biology, in: Annual Review of Biochemistry. Vol. 77; 51-76.

== See also ==
- James D. Watson
- Vijay Pande
- Steven Block
- Arthur Ashkin
- Julio M. Fernandez
- Alan Fersht
- Stephen D. Levene
- W. E. Moerner
- Paul Lauterbur
- List of biophysicists
