= Maria Aloni =

Italian philosopher

Maria D. Aloni (born 1969) is an Italian logician and philosopher of language, interested in formal semantics and the development of forms of logic that can capture the deviations of human reasoning from classical logic. She is an associate professor in the University of Amsterdam Faculty of Humanities, affiliated there with the Department of Philosophy and the Institute for Logic, Language and Computation.

== Education and career ==
Aloni was born in 1969 in Milan, and studied with the philosopher Andrea Bonomi and the linguist Gennaro Chierchia. She completed her PhD at the University of Amsterdam in 2001, advised by Jeroen Groenendijk and Paul J. E. Dekker.

She stayed on at the University of Amsterdam as a lecturer and postdoctoral researcher, also working for a year as a postdoctoral fellow at Utrecht University. In 2012 she became an assistant professor at the University of Amsterdam, and in 2018 she was promoted to associate professor.

== Book ==
With Paul Dekker, Aloni is co-editor of The Cambridge Handbook of Formal Semantics (Cambridge University Press, 2016).

== Recognition ==
Aloni was the 2002 winner of the E. W. Beth Dissertation Prize of the Association for Logic, Language and Information. She was elected to the Academia Europaea in 2020.
