= Analytical Chemistry (journal) =

- Cover of an issue of Analytical Chemistry
- Discipline: Chemistry
- Language: English
- Edited by: Jonathan V. Sweedler

Publication details
- History: 1929–present
- Publisher: ACS Publications (United States)
- Frequency: Biweekly
- Impact factor: 7.4 (2022)

Standard abbreviations
- ISO 4: Anal. Chem.

Indexing
- CODEN: ANCHAM
- ISSN: 0003-2700 (print); 1520-6882 (web)
- LCCN: 31021682
- OCLC no.: 37355019

Links
- Journal homepage; Online access; Online archive

Analytical Chemistry is a biweekly peer-reviewed scientific journal published since 1929 by the American Chemical Society. Articles address general principles of chemical measurement science and novel analytical methodologies. Topics commonly include chemical reactions and selectivity, chemometrics and data processing, electrochemistry, elemental and molecular characterization, imaging, instrumentation, mass spectrometry, microscale and nanoscale systems, -omics, sensing, separations, spectroscopy, and surface analysis. It is abstracted and indexed in Chemical Abstracts Service, CAB International, EBSCOhost, ProQuest, PubMed, Scopus, and the Science Citation Index Expanded. According to the Journal Citation Reports, it has a 2022 impact factor of 7.4. The editor-in-chief is Jonathan V. Sweedler (University of Illinois).

== See also ==
- List of chemistry journals
