= Martin Gruebele =

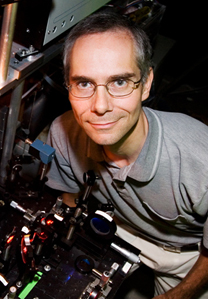
- Born: January 10, 1964 (age 62); Stuttgart, West Germany
- Citizenship: American, German
- Education: University of California, Berkeley, California Institute of Technology
- Known for: Protein folding, scanning tunneling microscopy, ultrafast laser spectroscopy
- Awards: Peter Debye Award of the American Chemical Society, Hans Neurath Award of the Protein Society, Nakanishi Prize, Sackler Prize, Friedrich Bessel Research Prize, Camille and Henry Dreyfus Foundation Fellowship
- Scientific career
- Fields: Chemistry, Physics, Biophysics, Computational biology
- Workplaces: University of Illinois Urbana-Champaign
- Academic advisors: Richard Saykally, Ahmed Zewail
- Website: gruebele-group.chemistry.illinois.edu

Martin Gruebele (born January 10, 1964, in Stuttgart, Germany) is a German-born American physical chemist and biophysicist who is currently emeritus James R. Eiszner Chair in Chemistry, Professor of Physics, Professor of Biophysics and Computational Biology at the University of Illinois Urbana-Champaign.

== Early life and education ==
He was born in Stuttgart, West Germany, son of Helmut Grübele and E. A. Victoria Grübele with two younger siblings Andrea and Philip. He attended the Lycée Français in Vienna, Austria, the Colegio ECOS in Marbella, Spain, and Drew School in San Francisco, US as Valedictorian. He completed his B.S in chemistry at the University of California, Berkeley in 1984, with the University Certificate of Distinction and Department Citation for Highest Honors. He was advised by Ken Sauer (biophysics), Wilhelm Maier (organic synthesis), and Richard J. Saykally (laser spectroscopy). He did his graduate work at the University of California, Berkeley in the laboratory of Richard J. Saykally, where he was a University Fellow (1984–1986), IBM Predoctoral Fellow, (1986–1987), and a Dow Chemical Graduate Fellow (1987–1988). Subsequently he held a postdoctoral position with Ahmed Zewail at California Institute of Technology, after which he joined the faculty of the University of Illinois in 1992.

== Current positions ==
Gruebele, now professor emeritus, was Head of chemistry (2017–2020) and James R. Eiszner Endowed Chair in Chemistry (2008–2024), professor of physics, professor of biophysics and quantitative biology, professor in the Center for Advanced Study, and professor in the Carle-Illinois College of Medicine. He also was a faculty member of the Beckman Institute at the University of Illinois, and was an adjunct professor of physics at Michigan State University to support biological physics faculty mentoring.

== Research ==
His research covers a wide range of areas in chemical physics and biological physics, including the kinetics of biological systems, quantum dynamics of energy flow within molecules, and optically assisted scanning tunneling microscopy. A common theme of his research is the implementation of state-of-the-art laser and microscopy techniques to interrogate and manipulate complex systems, coupled with quantum or classical simulations. He has published over 300 articles, books and patents on topics ranging from quantum computing, to RNA and protein folding in the test tube and inside cells, to fish swimming behavioral studies, and ultra-distance cycling.

== Recent work ==
- High resolution absorption and emission spectroscopy of molecules to study vibrational energy redistribution and develop models of energy flow beyond Fermi's_Golden_Rule.
- Dynamics of fast-folding proteins to make the connection between experiment and physics-based computer simulations of protein folding.
- FreI (fast relaxation imaging) that combines fluorescence microscopy and fast temperature jump or osmotic pressure jump to study protein dynamics inside living cells and living animals.
- A sub-microsecond pressure jump technique to study fast protein refolding and help guide computer simulations (molecular dynamics) for how proteins fold.
- With Martina Havenith, kinetic terahertz absorption spectroscopy elucidating the role of long-range interactions of water with biomolecules.
- Two-state dynamics recorded on glass surfaces using time-resolved scanning tunneling microscopy, to measure the size and heterogeneous dynamics of cooperatively rearranging regions on a glass.
- SMA-STM (single molecule absorption detected by scanning tunneling microscopy), a technique that can image excited state orbitals of nanostructures with sub-nanometer position resolution and sub-picosecond time resolution.
- With Stephen Boppart, non-linear interferometric vibrational imaging which produces easy-to-read, color-coded images of tissue, outlining clear tumor boundaries with more than 99% confidence.
- Computational and theoretical work in the area of quantum energy flow, quantum computation, and quantum information, as well as fundamental transport theory.
- Animal behavior studied by using physics-constrained AI analysis.

== Awards ==
- Gruebele is a Member of the National Academy of Sciences (2013), a Member of the American Academy of Arts and Sciences (2010), and a Member of the German Academy of Sciences Leopoldina (2008).
- He is a Fellow of the American Chemical Society (2015), American Physical Society (2002), and the Biophysical Society (2005).
- Gruebele has received national and international awards, such as the Peter Debye Award of the American Chemical Society (2026), the Hans Neurath Award of the Protein Society (2020), TREE Award (Research Corporation, 2018) the Nakanishi Prize (2017), the Raymond and Beverly Sackler Prize in the Physical Sciences (Tel Aviv University, 2008), the Friedrich Wilhelm Bessel Prize (Alexander von Humboldt Foundation, 2005), and the Coblentz Award (Coblentz Society, 2000). He was also awarded an Alfred P. Sloan Fellowship (1997), a Cottrell Scholar Award from the Research Corporation (1995), the Camille and Henry Dreyfus Fellowship (1998, 1992), a David and Lucile Packard Fellowship (Packard Foundation, 1994), a National Young Investigator Award (NSF, 1994), and a Beckman Fellowship, 1995–1996.

Gruebele collaborated with Hanoi University of Science to port the University of Illinois Department of Chemistry undergraduate curriculum for Chemistry to Vietnam. He has been on the list of "Teachers Ranked Excellent by their Students" at Illinois multiple times (most recently before he retired in 2024), and received the School of Chemical Sciences Teaching Excellence Award. He is a contributor to LibreTexts, which makes open-access textbooks available to students.

== Personal ==
Gruebele is married to Nancy Makri, who is also a professor of chemistry and physics at University of Illinois at Urbana-Champaign. They have two children, Alexander and Valerie. He has a strong interest in cycling, running, swimming and triathlon and has competed in many long-distance events, such as the 2013 Boston Marathon, the 2016 solo Race Across America, the 2019 Badwater Ultramarathon, the 1406 mile DECA 2022 World Championship ultratriathlon, the 10 day non-stop run at "6 Days in the Dome" in 2024, 15-Ironman^{TM}-Distances-in-15-Days at "What is the Limit" Garda Lake in 2024, and the Ironman World Championship. He has written three how-to books on multi-day ultra-distance cycling, ultratriathlon, and ultrarunning, and is an avid scale modeler and pipe organist.

== See also ==
- Nancy Makri
- Kurt Wüthrich
- Vijay Pande
- David Baker
- Valerie Daggett
- W. E. Moerner
- Paul Lauterbur
- List of biophysicists
