= Nanshu Lu =

Chemist

- Born: Chengdu, Sichuan, China
- Education: Harvard University, Tsinghua University
- Awards: NSF Career Award, MIT 35 Under 35
- Scientific career
- Workplaces: University of Texas at Austin
- Doctoral advisor: Zhigang Suo and Joost Vlassak

Nanshu Lu is an associate professor at the University of Texas at Austin where she leads the Lu Research Group in the department of aerospace engineering and engineering mechanics. She also holds a courtesy appointment in the department of biomedical engineering. Lu is recognized for her work on the integration of electronics into stretchable materials compatible with human tissue, for which she was named one of the Top 35 innovators under the age of 35 by the MIT Technology Review in 2012.

== Education ==
Nanshu Lu attended Tsinghua University in Beijing, China, graduating with a bachelor's degree in engineering mechanics in 2005. Lu earned her master's degree in applied physics in 2006 and her doctoral degree in 2009, both from Harvard University, at the Harvard School of Engineering and Applied Sciences (SEAS). For her doctorate, she studied solid mechanics with Zhigang Suo and Joost Vlassak. She did postdoctoral work at the University of Illinois at Urbana–Champaign where she was a Beckman Postdoctoral Fellow from 2009 to 2011, working with John A. Rogers.

== Career ==
Lu joined the Aerospace Engineering and Engineering Mechanics (ASE/EM) department at the University of Texas at Austin in 2011. There she leads the Lu Research Group in studying stretchable materials with bio-integrated electronics.

== Research ==
Lu has been recognized for her work on the “Flexoelectricity of Nanomaterials on Deformable Substrates.” By enhancing electromechanical coupling at a nanoscale level using flexoelectricity, mechanical action can be transformed into electrical impulses.

One project which she co-lead developed a balloon catheter, capable of monitoring heartbeats, pressure, and temperature, while inflating inside the body. The device can increase the safety of heart surgery.

In another project, electronics were integrated into stretchable materials to create flexible silicone devices that attach to and mimic the texture and elasticity of skin. These have been referred to as "electronic skin" or "electronic tattoos". Instead of hard and brittle silicon chips, Lu created a flexible polymer substrate containing a mesh of nanoscale metallic ribbons. The resulting device, only 30 micrometers thick, can be printed onto a silicone patch that sticks to the skin without irritation. Sensors in the thin "electronic skin" monitor vital signs such as pulse, temperature, and vocalization. The devices have potential application in both medical monitoring and treatment.

== Awards ==
- 2015, Office of Naval Research (ONR) Young Investigator Program Award
- 2015, Air Force Office of Scientific Research (AFOSR) Young Investigator Award
- 2014, 3M Non-Tenured Faculty Award
- 2014, Faculty Early Career Development (CAREER) Award from the National Science Foundation
- 2013, NetExplo Grand Prix, Paris, France
- 2012, Top 35 innovators under the age of 35, MIT Technology Review
- 2009, Beckman Postdoctoral Fellow
