= Nakanishi Prize =

Annual chemistry award

The Nakanishi Prize, named after Japanese chemist Koji Nakanishi, is an award in chemistry given alternately by the Chemical Society of Japan and the American Chemical Society.

== Purpose ==
"To recognize and stimulate significant work that extends chemical and spectroscopic methods to the study of important biological phenomena."

== History ==
In 1995, friends and colleagues of Nakanishi established the Nakanishi Prize. It was decided that the Chemical Society of Japan and the American Chemical Society would alternate years awarding the prize. There are two separate endowments for the prize for each society, but the prize is the same for both awards: a medallion in presentation box, $5,000 prize money, and $2,500 travel reimbursements.

== Recipients ==
Source: American Chemical Society

Year	Recipient	Institution	Rationale	Awarded by
1996	Yoshimasa Hirata	Nagoya University		Chemical Society of Japan
1997	Frank H. Westheimer	Harvard University		American Chemical Society
1998	Albert J. Eschenmoser	ETH Zurich		Chemical Society of Japan
1999	Jeremy R. Knowles	Harvard University		American Chemical Society
2000	Satoshi Ōmura	Kitasato University		Chemical Society of Japan
2001	John D. Roberts	California Institute of Technology		American Chemical Society
2002	Sir Jack Baldwin	University of Oxford		Chemical Society of Japan
2003	A. Ian Scott	Texas A&M University		American Chemical Society
2004	Isao Kitagawa	Kyoritsu College of Pharmacy Osaka University		Chemical Society of Japan
2005	Stephen J. Benkovic	Pennsylvania State University		American Chemical Society
2006	Takeshi Yasumoto	Tohoku University Okinawa Science and Technology Promotion Center	For his "contribution to the chemistry of seafood poisonings and analytical study on dynamism of the causative toxic molecules among marine ecology"	Chemical Society of Japan
2007	Hung-wen Liu	University of Texas at Austin		American Chemical Society
2008	Michel Rohmer	Louis Pasteur University		Chemical Society of Japan
2009	JoAnne Stubbe	Massachusetts Institute of Technology	For identifying the role of radical intermediates in ribonucleotide reductase functions	American Chemical Society
2010	Shosuke Yamamura	Keio University		Chemical Society of Japan
2011	C. Dale Poulter	University of Utah		American Chemical Society
2012	Daisuke Uemura	Kanagawa University		Chemical Society of Japan
2013	Arthur G. Palmer III	Columbia University		American Chemical Society
2014	Jerrold Meinwald	Cornell University		Chemical Society of Japan
2015	Fred W. McLafferty	Cornell University	For developing “top-down proteomics” for characterizing a protein's sequence and modifications	American Chemical Society
2016	Shoichi Kusumoto			Chemical Society of Japan
2017	Martin Gruebele			American Chemical Society
2018	Nobuyuki Harada	Tohoku University		Chemical Society of Japan
2019	Lewis E. Kay	University of Toronto		American Chemical Society
2020	Yoshito Kishi	Harvard University		Chemical Society of Japan
2021	Mei Hong	Massachusetts Institute of Technology		American Chemical Society
2022	Takenori Kusumi	Tokushima University		Chemical Society of Japan
2023	Gilad Haran	Weizmann Institute of Science		American Chemical Society
2024	Minoru Isobe			

== See also ==
- List of chemistry awards
