= Paul Berg =

American biochemist (1926–2023)

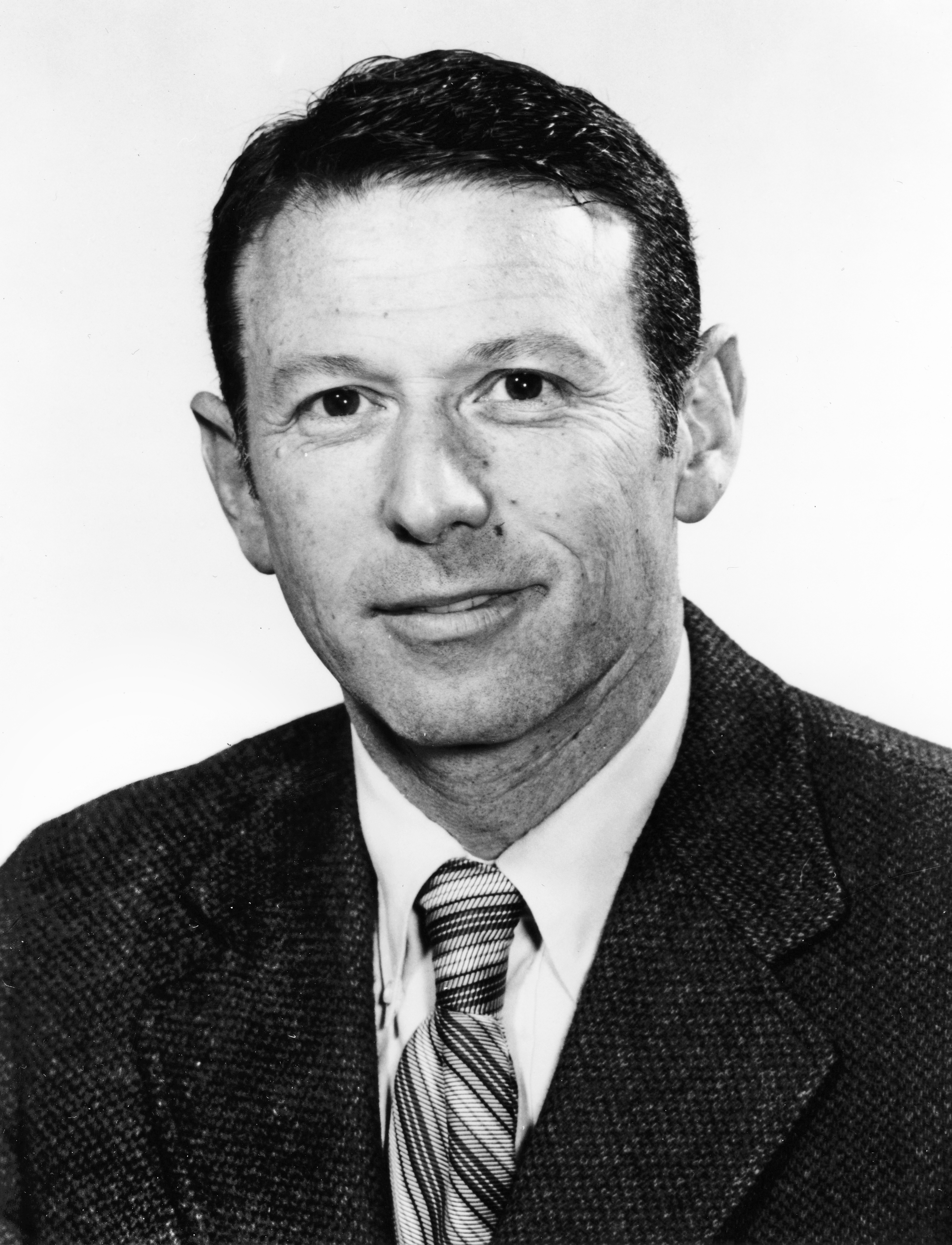
- Berg in 1980
- Born: June 30, 1926; New York City, U.S.
- Died: February 15, 2023 (aged 96); Stanford, California, U.S.
- Education: Pennsylvania State University (BS); Case Western Reserve University (PhD)
- Known for: Recombinant DNA
- Spouse: Mildred Levy (m. 1947)
- Children: 1
- Awards: Nobel Prize in Chemistry (1980); AAAS Award for Scientific Freedom and Responsibility (1982); National Medal of Science (1983); Max Delbrück Medal (1999)
- Scientific career
- Fields: Biochemistry
- Workplaces: Stanford University; Washington University in St. Louis; Clare Hall, Cambridge

Paul Berg (June 30, 1926 – February 15, 2023) was an American biochemist and professor at Stanford University. He received the 1980 Nobel Prize in Chemistry "for his fundamental studies of the biochemistry of nucleic acids, with particular regard to recombinant-DNA".

Berg received his undergraduate education at Penn State University, where he majored in biochemistry. He received his PhD in biochemistry from Case Western Reserve University in 1952. Berg worked as a professor at Washington University School of Medicine and Stanford University School of Medicine, in addition to serving as the director of the Beckman Center for Molecular and Genetic Medicine.

In addition to the Nobel Prize, Berg was presented with the National Medal of Science in 1983 and the National Library of Medicine Medal in 1986. Berg was a member of the Board of Sponsors for the Bulletin of the Atomic Scientists.

== Early life and education ==
Berg was born in Brooklyn, New York City. He was the son of a Russian Jewish immigrant couple, Sarah Brodsky, a homemaker, and Harry Berg, a clothing manufacturer. Berg graduated from Abraham Lincoln High School in 1943, received his Bachelor of Science degree in biochemistry from Penn State University in 1948 and PhD in biochemistry from Case Western Reserve University in 1952. He was a member of the Jewish fraternity, ΒΣΡ.

== Research and career ==
=== Academic posts ===
After completing his graduate studies, Berg spent two years (1952–1954) as a postdoctoral fellow with the American Cancer Society, working at the Institute of Cytophysiology in Copenhagen, Denmark, and the Washington University School of Medicine, and spent additional time in 1954 as a scholar in cancer research with the department of microbiology at the Washington University School of Medicine. He worked with Arthur Kornberg, while at Washington University. Berg was also tenured as a research fellow at Clare Hall, Cambridge. He was a professor at Washington University School of Medicine from 1955 until 1959. After 1959, Berg moved to Stanford University, where he taught biochemistry from 1959 until 2000 and served as director of the Beckman Center for Molecular and Genetic Medicine from 1985 until 2000. In 2000 he retired from his administrative and teaching posts, continuing to be active in research.

=== Research interests ===
Berg's postgraduate studies involved the use of radioisotope tracers to study intermediary metabolism. This resulted in the understanding of how foodstuffs are converted to cellular materials, through the use of isotopic carbons or heavy nitrogen atoms. Paul Berg's doctorate paper is now known as the conversion of formic acid, formaldehyde and methanol to fully reduced states of methyl groups in methionine. He was also one of the first to demonstrate that folic acid and B_{12} cofactors had roles in the processes mentioned.

Berg is arguably most famous for his pioneering work involving gene splicing of recombinant DNA. Berg was the first scientist to create a molecule containing DNA from two different species by inserting DNA from another species into a molecule. This gene-splicing technique was a fundamental step in the development of modern genetic engineering. After developing the technique, Berg used it for his studies of viral chromosomes.

Berg was a professor emeritus at Stanford. As of 2000, he stopped doing active research, to focus on other interests, including involvement in public policy for biomedical issues involving recombinant DNA and embryonic stem cells and publishing a book about geneticist George Beadle.

Berg was a member of the Board of Sponsors of the Bulletin of the Atomic Scientists. He was also an organizer of the Asilomar conference on recombinant DNA in 1975. The previous year, Berg and other scientists had called for a voluntary moratorium on certain recombinant DNA research until they could evaluate the risks. That influential conference did evaluate the potential hazards and set guidelines for biotechnology research. It can be seen as an early application of the precautionary principle.

=== Awards and honors ===
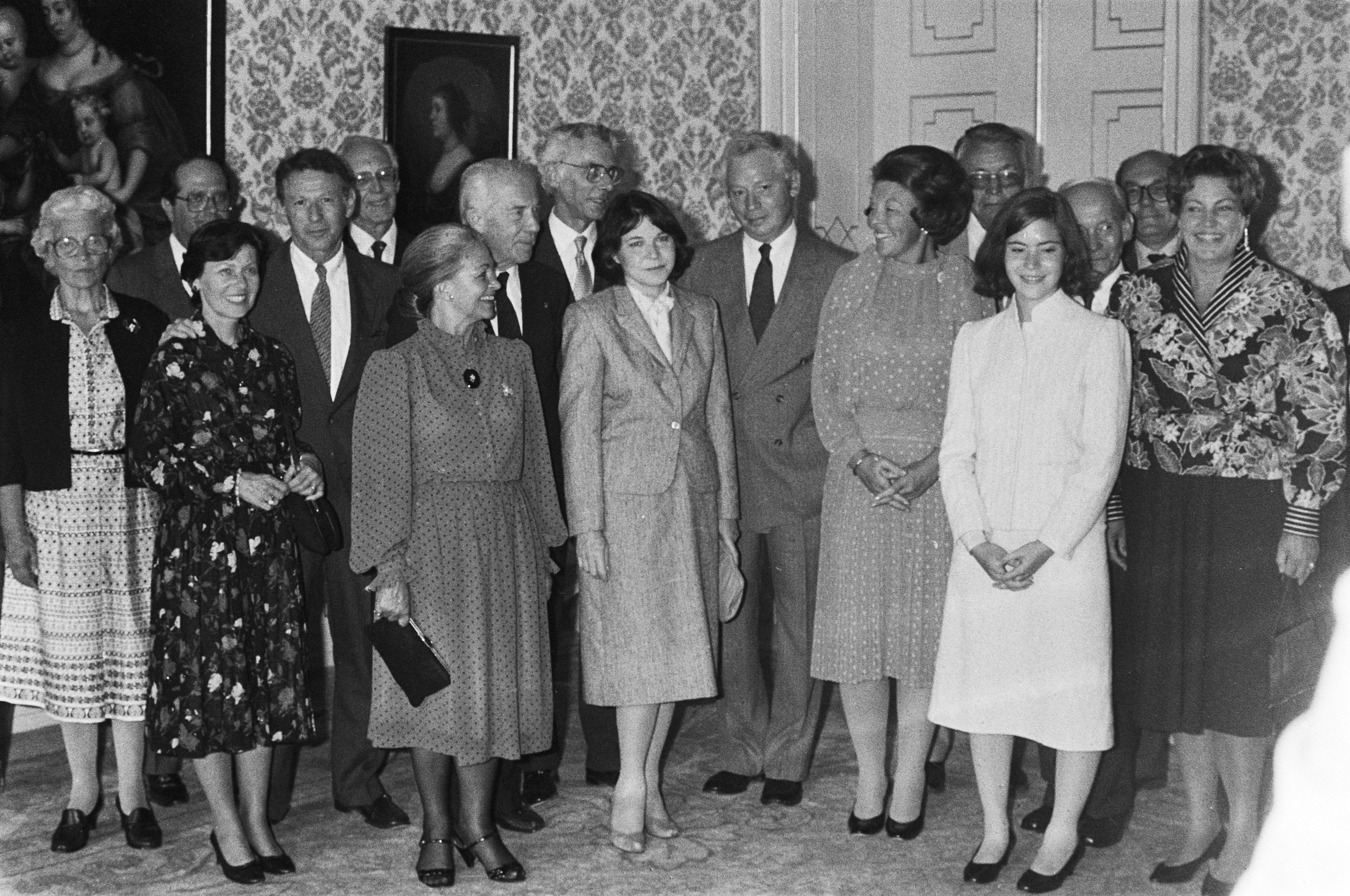
Queen Beatrix meets Nobel laureates in 1983, Mildred Levy and Paul Berg are second couple from the left

==== Nobel Prize ====
Berg was awarded one-half of the 1980 Nobel Prize in Chemistry, with the other half being shared by Walter Gilbert and Frederick Sanger. Berg was recognized for "his fundamental studies of the biochemistry of nucleic acids, with particular regard to recombinant DNA", while Sanger and Gilbert were honored for "their contributions concerning the determination of base sequences in nucleic acids."

==== Other awards and honors ====
He was elected a Fellow of the American Academy of Arts and Sciences and a member of the United States National Academy of Sciences in 1966. In 1983, Ronald Reagan presented Berg with the National Medal of Science. That same year, he was elected to the American Philosophical Society. In 1989, he received the Golden Plate Award of the American Academy of Achievement. He was elected a Foreign Member of the Royal Society (ForMemRS) in 1992. In 2005 he was awarded the Biotechnology Heritage Award by the Biotechnology Industry Organization (BIO) and the Chemical Heritage Foundation. In 2006 he received Wonderfest's Carl Sagan Prize for Science Popularization.

== Death ==
Berg died on February 15, 2023, at the age of 96.

== See also ==
- List of Jewish Nobel laureates
