= Clifford P. Brangwynne =

American academic

- Born: April 24, 1978 (age 48); Boston, Massachusetts, USA
- Education: Carnegie Mellon University Harvard University
- Scientific career
- Fields: Soft-matter physics, cell biology
- Workplaces: Princeton University

Cliff Brangwynne, 2025. Photo by Greg Kahn/HHMI

Clifford P. Brangwynne is an American bioengineer, biophysicist and pioneer in the study of biomolecular condensates. Brangwynne is a professor of chemical and biological engineering at Princeton University, the director of the Omenn-Darling Bioengineering Institute, and the June K. Wu ’92 Professor in Engineering. He is also a researcher at the Howard Hughes Medical Institute.

== Education ==
Brangwynne graduated from Carnegie Mellon University in 2001 with a degree in materials science and engineering, and received his Ph.D. in applied physics from Harvard University in 2007. He served as a postdoctoral fellow from 2007 to 2010 at the Max Planck Institute of Molecular Cell Biology and Genetics, working with his adviser Anthony Hyman.

== Career ==
In 2009, Brangwynne discovered that cellular structures known as P granules dissolved and condensed in their surrounding cytoplasm through a process of liquid-liquid phase separation, with no confining membrane, overturning long-held assumptions about the nature of organelles. In 2012, liquid-liquid phase separation was linked to neurodegenerative diseases such as ALS and Alzheimer’s. In 2017, it was linked to gene regulation.

Brangwynne joined the Princeton faculty in 2011 as an assistant professor of chemical and biological engineering. At the time he was hired, the P granules paper had fewer than 10 citations; it has since accumulated more than 3,300. He was promoted to associate professor in 2017 and to full professor in 2019. In 2020, he was named the June K. Wu ’92 Professor of Chemical and Biological Engineering and director of the Princeton Bioengineering Initiative, renamed the Omenn-Darling Bioengineering Institute in 2023.

== Awards ==
- 2025 – Kyoto University Lectureship Award
- 2025 – Keio Medical Science Prize
- 2025 – Clarivate Citation Laureate
- 2024 – CMU Alumni Achievement Award
- 2023 – Dickson Prize in Medicine
- 2023 – Breakthrough Prize in Life Sciences
- 2022 – Tsuneko & Reiji Okazaki Award
- 2021 – HFSP Nakasone Award
- 2021 – Wiley Prize in Biomedical Sciences
- 2020 – Blavatnik Awards for Young Scientists
- 2020 – Michael and Kate Bárány Award
- 2018 and 2019 – Finalists for Blavatnik Awards for Young Scientists
- 2018 – MacArthur Fellowship
- 2014 – Sloan Research Fellowship
- 2013 – National Science Foundation CAREER Award
- 2012 – NIH Director's New Innovator Award
- 2012 – Searle Scholars Program
- 2008–2010 – Fellow of Helen Hay Whitney Foundation
