= Gerald Penn (immunologist) =

American immunologist

- Education: Ohio State University (MD, PhD)
- Known for: Immunoelectrophoresis
- Scientific career
- Fields: Immunology
- Workplaces: Ohio State University

Gerald Penn is a clinical immunologist, and a pioneer in the field of clinical immunoelectrophoresis. He was a student of Henry Kunkel at Rockefeller University from 1968 to 1970, and holds both an M.D. and Ph.D. from the Ohio State University. His research also includes one of the earliest studies on the negative effects of naturally occurring stressors on the response of the human immune system. He is a clinical associate professor of pathology at the Ohio State University.
