= Beckman Center for Molecular and Genetic Medicine =

Research center at Stanford University

Coordinates: 37.431870°N 122.176641°W

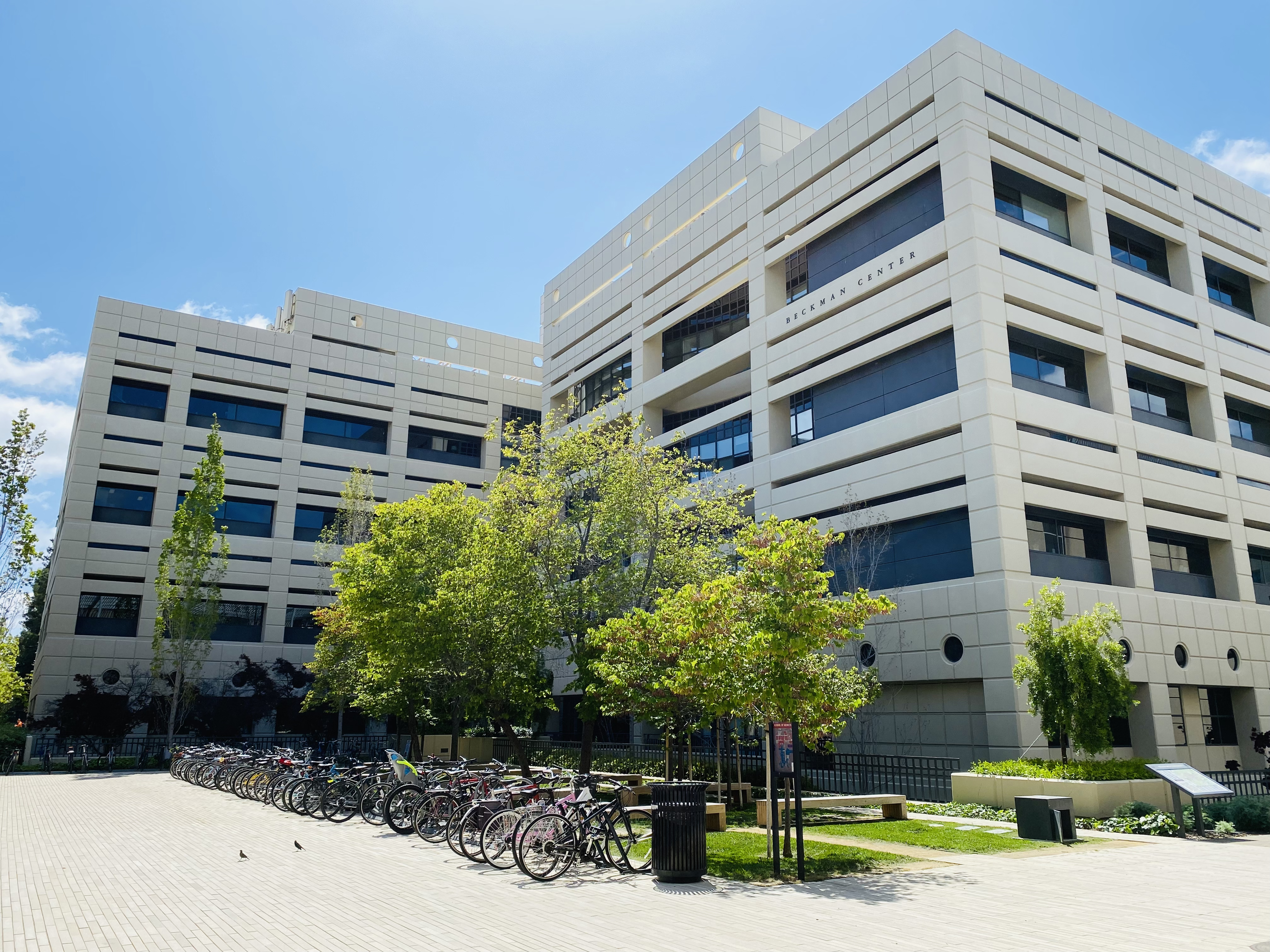
- Established: 1989
- Director: Lucy Shapiro
- Key people: Paul Berg
- Address: 279 Campus Drive West, Stanford University School of Medicine, Stanford, CA 94305-5301
- Location: Stanford University, Stanford, California, California, United States of America
- Website: http://beckman.stanford.edu/

The Beckman Center for Molecular and Genetic Medicine is an interdisciplinary center, part of Stanford School of Medicine at Stanford University, Stanford, California. Considered a "unique facility", it was one of the first research centers to take a translational medicine approach to molecular and medical genetics.

== History ==
An interdisciplinary center for molecular and genetic medicine at the Stanford School of Medicine was proposed in the 1980s by Paul Berg, Arthur Kornberg, Donald Kennedy and others. Berg has said, "At the time, our goal was to focus on the molecular and genetic basis of disease as the starting point for new forms of medicine... We wanted to improve the process by which studies at the most fundamental level could be translated into medical practice." This type of "bench-to-bedside" approach has since been termed translational medicine.

The center was privately funded. Paul Berg obtained the support of philanthropists Arnold O. Beckman (1900-2004) and his wife Mabel (1900-1989), which was critical to establishing the center. The Beckmans agreed to donate $12 million over 5 years, approximately 1/5 of the cost of the new center, through the Arnold and Mabel Beckman Foundation. In addition, Beckman promoted the project to others who contributed an approximately equal amount. As of 2004 the Beckman Center for Molecular and Genetic Medicine is one of five institutions which receive support from the Arnold and Mabel Beckman Foundation on an ongoing basis. The Howard Hughes Medical Institute, headed by Donald S. Fredrickson was also a major supporter of the center.

Paul Berg, who had received a Nobel Prize in 1980, was appointed as the first director of the center in 1985. In addition to the existing Department of Biochemistry, two new departments were created within the center: Molecular and Developmental Biology and Molecular and Cellular Physiology. The Howard Hughes Medical Institute Unit of Molecular and Genetic Medicine was also included in the Beckman Center. Establishment of the center enabled Stanford to substantially expand its faculty, creating 20 new positions in the Beckman Center in addition to those already in the medical school. To connect the various departments and researchers, Berg officially established the Program in Molecular and Genetic Medicine as a unified program "for all those interested in molecular and genetic approaches to biological question, and to provide access to funding, facilities, and teaching opportunities."

The Beckman Center for Molecular and Genetic Medicine officially opened on May 24, 1989. Since then, researchers at the Center have developed a variety of new techniques and made substantial scientific contributions. Leonard and Leonore Herzenberg brought fluorescence-activated cell sorting technology to the Beckman Center. Their technology enabled Irving Weissman to isolate hematopoietic stem cells. Patrick O. Brown and Ronald W. Davis developed techniques for DNA microarrays. Biochemist James Spudich and Nobel-winning physicist Steven Chu collaborated on research to target single atoms and measure molecular force and later launched the interdisciplinary Stanford University Bio-X Initiative.

Scientists have developed and explored a variety of scientific models, from Lucy Shapiro's single-celled Caulobacter crescentus to the three-spined stickleback and the zebrafish. Many are working on understanding basic processes whose disruption can cause disease. Roel Nusse has explored the Wnt signaling pathway in mice and fruit flies, and linked it to cancer and diabetes. Philip A. Beachy has examined the Hedgehog signaling pathway and its role in embryonic development and cell formation. Matthew P. Scott has identified the human homolog PTCH1 as a key tumor suppressor gene for the Hedgehog signaling pathway and the causative gene for Nevoid basal-cell carcinoma syndrome.

Many of the faculty have received important awards for their work. Brian Kobilka was a co-recipient of the 2012 Nobel Prize in Chemistry for his work on the mechanisms of G protein–coupled receptors. Thomas C. Südhof was a co-recipient of the 2013 Nobel Prize in Physiology or Medicine for discovering how vesicles release their contents when nerve cells communicate with one another in the brain.

At a 25th anniversary symposium, entitled "Innovation in the Biosphere", speakers spoke of the importance of the center's collaborative multidisciplinary environment. Director Lucy Shapiro emphasized information transfer:

What has changed so dramatically is our understanding of how the biological world codes, decodes, and uses information in time and space to create and maintain life on this planet. And almost everything we do comes down to mining information and dealing with not only vast amounts of data but very small molecules and small circuitry. The bedrock of what it means to be a living entity is an understanding of how a cell or tissue functions as an integrated system.

— Lucy Shapiro, 2015

== Directors ==
- Lucy Shapiro, Director, 2000-
- Paul Berg, Director emeritus, served as director from 1985-2000

== Faculty ==
The Beckman Center for Molecular and Genetic Medicine has included at least two Nobel laureates and 12 members of the National Academy of Sciences among its faculty. Over 200 faculty members from the university are members of the Program in Molecular and Genetic Medicine.

== Research Fellowships ==
The Beckman Fellow program at Stanford was established in 1999 to support young researchers.

== Research services ==
The Beckman center has developed several core "service centers" whose resources can be utilized by associated researchers. These include a Computer Services and Bioinformatics Facility (CSBF), a Cell Sciences Imaging Facility (CSIF), a Fluorescence Activated Cell Sorting Facility (FACS), and a Protein and Nucleic Acid Facility (PAN).
