= Ryan C. Bailey =

American professor of chemistry

- Scientific career
- Fields: Chemistry
- Institutions: University of Michigan
- Website: https://lsa.umich.edu/chem/people/faculty/ryancb.html

Ryan C. Bailey is an American professor of chemistry at the University of Michigan.

Bailey joined the department of chemistry in 2006 as assistant professor and was promoted to associate professor with tenure in 2012. In 2011, he was received the Sloan Research Fellowship from the Alfred P. Sloan Foundation.

Bailey's specialty is the development of bioanalytic methods for cell biology, with the goal of studying protein diversity. His most cited paper, Encai Hao, Ryan C. Bailey, George C. Schatz, Joseph T. Hupp, and Shuyou Li "Synthesis and Optical Properties of "Branched" Gold Nanocrystals" Nano Letters, 2004, 4 (2), pp 327–330 DOI: 10.1021/nl0351542 has been cited 431 times according to Google Scholar. Twenty-five of his papers have been cited 25 times of more.
