= Scott K. Silverman =

- Born: October 7, 1972 (age 53); Los Angeles, California, United States
- Education: B.S. UCLA, Ph.D. Caltech, Postdoc University of Colorado Boulder
- Awards: Beckman Fellow, 2004-2005
- Scientific career
- Fields: Chemistry, Chemical Biology, Organic Chemistry, Biochemistry
- Institutions: University of Illinois at Urbana–Champaign
- Academic advisors: Dennis A. Dougherty, Thomas R. Cech
- Website: www.chemistry.illinois.edu/faculty/Scott_Silverman.html

Scott K. Silverman is a professor of chemistry at the University of Illinois at Urbana-Champaign. He joined the department of chemistry in 2000 as assistant professor, was promoted to associate professor with tenure in 2006, and was promoted to professor in 2010.

His main research interest is in the identification, characterization, and application of deoxyribozymes, DNA used as a catalyst.
