= Benjamin D. Wandelt =

Cosmologist

- Education: Imperial College London
- Known for: Cosmic Microwave Background, Computational Methods in Cosmology
- Awards: Fellow of the American Physical Society (2015), Friedrich Wilhelm Bessel Research Award
- Scientific career
- Fields: Theoretical Astrophysics, Cosmology
- Workplaces: University of Illinois at Urbana-Champaign, Sorbonne University, Institut d'Astrophysique de Paris

Benjamin D. Wandelt is a theoretical astrophysicist and cosmologist whose research focuses on the early universe, cosmic microwave background, and large-scale structure of the cosmos.

== Early life and education ==
Wandelt earned his Ph.D. in astrophysics from Imperial College London.

== Career ==
Wandelt has held faculty positions in the Departments of Physics and Astronomy at the University of Illinois at Urbana-Champaign. Wandelt has served as a professor at Sorbonne University and as the director of the Lagrange Institute at the Institut d'Astrophysique de Paris.

== Awards and honors ==
Wandelt has been a recipient of the Friedrich Wilhelm Bessel Research Award from the Alexander von Humboldt Foundation.
