= Nancy Makri =

Greek physicist

- Born: September 5, 1962 (age 63); Athens, Greece
- Education: University of Athens, University of California at Berkeley
- Spouse: Martin Gruebele
- Scientific career
- Fields: chemical physics, theoretical chemistry
- Workplaces: Harvard, University of Illinois
- Doctoral advisor: William H. Miller

Nancy Makri (born September 5, 1962) is the Edward William and Jane Marr Gutgsell Endowed Professor of Chemistry and Physics at the University of Illinois Urbana–Champaign, where she leads research into the theoretical understanding of condensed phase quantum dynamics. She studies theoretical quantum dynamics of polyatomic systems, and has developed methods for long-time numerical path integral simulations of quantum dissipative systems.

== Early life and education ==
Nancy Makri was born in Athens, Greece on September 5, 1962. She graduated with a B.S. in chemistry from the University of Athens in 1985, where she worked with Cleanthes A. Nicolaides. She then attended the University of California at Berkeley and received her Ph.D. in 1989 under the direction of William H. Miller. Her thesis title was Theoretical methods for the study of chemical dynamics. In 1992 she married physical chemist Martin Gruebele.

== Career ==
Makri spent two years as a junior fellow at Harvard University, from 1989-1991. She joined the chemistry faculty of the University of Illinois Urbana–Champaign in 1992. In 1996 she became associate professor with tenure, and in 1999, professor of chemistry and physics. She directs a research group there focused on the theoretical understanding of condensed phase quantum dynamics and has co-authored over 100 scientific articles. She is also an affiliate of the Beckman Institute for Science and Technology.

Makri works in the area of theoretical chemical physics. She has developed new theoretical approaches to simulating the dynamics of quantum mechanical phenomena. Makri has developed novel methods for calculating numerically exact path integrals for the simulation of system dynamics in harmonic dissipative environments. Her simulation algorithms address the limitations of the Schrödinger equation, which can only describe physical changes exactly in the quantum state of small molecules. By identifying aspects of simulations which can be effectively simplified, Makri's group developed "the first fully quantum mechanical methodology for calculating the evolution of a quantum system in a dissipative environment by performing an iterative decomposition of Feynman’s path integral expression". Such simplifications make it possible to calculate outcomes that otherwise would not be mathematically feasible. Her careful examinations of the system-harmonic bath model have resulted in techniques for avoiding the Monte Carlo sign problem.

The ability to model proton and electron transfer reactions has been successfully applied to biological systems such as the quantum simulation of electron transfer in bacterial photosynthesis, offering "a complete and unambiguous picture of the process". More recent work has focused on developing a methodology for forward-backward semiclassical dynamics using classical trajectory calculations. This approach has been used to model the activity of helium in both normal and superfluid phases, examining Bose-statistical effects in relationship to phase transitions.

== Awards and honors ==
Makri has received a number of awards and honors, including the following:

- Member, National Academy of Sciences, USA, 2023
- Theoretical Chemistry Award, American Chemical Society, 2022
- Member, American Academy of Arts and Sciences, 2021
- The Löwdin Lecturer, Uppsala University, Sweden, 2019
- Member, International Academy of Quantum Molecular Science, elected 2010
- Arnold O. Beckman Research Award, University of Illinois Research Board, 2003
- Fellow, American Physical Society, 2001, "For developing novel real time path integral methods and decisively quantifying how condensed phase environments affect quantum barrier crossing and biological charge transfer."
- Academic Prize in Physical Sciences, Bodossaki Foundation, 2000
- Agnes Fay Morgan Research Award, 1999, "for her work with photosynthesis and the charge transfer reactions which occur in photosynthetic systems"
- Fellow, American Association for the Advancement of Science, 1998
- Camille Dreyfus Teacher Scholar Award, 1997
- Annual Medal of the International Academy of Quantum Molecular Science, 1995
- Cottrell Scholar Award, Research Corporation,1994
- Sloan Research Fellowship, 1994
- David and Lucille Packard Fellowship for Science and Engineering, Packard Foundation, 1993
- National Science Foundation Young Investigator Award, 1993
- Beckman Young Investigators Award, 1993
