= Todd Coleman =

American electrical engineer

Todd Prentice Coleman
- Born: 1977 (age 48–49)
- Education: Massachusetts Institute of Technology; University of Michigan
- Scientific career
- Workplaces: Stanford University; University of Illinois Urbana-Champaign; University of California, San Diego
- Thesis: Low-complexity approaches to distributed data dissemination (2006)

Todd Prentice Coleman (born 1977) is an American electrical engineer and associate professor at Stanford University. He is a Fellow of the American Institute for Medical and Biological Engineering and Institute of Electrical and Electronics Engineers.

== Early life and education ==
Coleman completed his undergraduate and graduate degrees at the University of Michigan. He moved to the Massachusetts Institute of Technology for his doctoral research, where he used low complexity approaches to distributed data dissemination. He worked alongside Muriel Médard using Slepian–Wolf coding. He was a postdoctoral researcher at Massachusetts General Hospital, where he worked in computational neuroscience.

== Research and career ==
Coleman uses bioelectronics, mathematics and physiology to create new technologies. He started his faculty career at the University of Illinois Urbana-Champaign and University of California, San Diego. He joined Stanford University in 2021.

Coleman creates wearable sensors for medical imaging and biological applications. The sensors that Coleman has developed can monitor temperature and heart rate, and wirelessly transfer information to recording devices (e.g. smart phones). Coleman created an array of sensors for gastrointestinal disease, which can be attached to the abdomen and record EKG information whilst patients go about their normal routine.

== Awards and honours ==
- 2015 National Academy of Engineering Gilbreth Lecturer
- 2019 Fellow of the American Institute for Medical and Biological Engineering
- 2022 Fellow of the Institute of Electrical and Electronics Engineers
- 2022 Frontiers Lecture

== Select publications ==
- Nikolay Martirosyan; Mohammad Y S Kalani (1 December 2011). "Epidermal electronics". World Neurosurgery. 76 (6): 485–486. doi:10.1016/j.wneu.2011.10.001. ISSN 1878-8750. PMID 22251489. Wikidata Q83260489.
- Jonathan A Fan; Woon-Hong Yeo; Yewang Su; et al. (1 January 2014). "Fractal design concepts for stretchable electronics". Nature Communications. 5: 3266. Bibcode:2014NatCo...5.3266F. doi:10.1038/ncomms4266. ISSN 2041-1723. PMID 24509865. Wikidata Q44993884.
- Christopher J Quinn; Todd P Coleman; Negar Kiyavash; Nicholas G Hatsopoulos (26 June 2010). "Estimating the directed information to infer causal relationships in ensemble neural spike train recordings". Journal of Computational Neuroscience. 30 (1): 17–44. doi:10.1007/s10827-010-0247-2. ISSN 0929-5313. PMC 3171872. PMID 20582566. Wikidata Q38387247.
