= Abdelrahman Mohamed (AI researcher) =

Egyptian-American AI scientist

- عبد الرحمن محمد
- Born: Egypt
- Other name: Abdel-rahman Mohamed
- Education: Cairo University (BSc, MSc); University of Toronto (PhD)
- Known for: Deep belief networks for speech recognition, wav2vec 2.0, HuBERT
- Awards: IEEE Signal Processing Society Best Paper Award (2016); IEEE Signal Processing Magazine Best Paper Award (2022)
- Scientific career
- Fields: Speech processing, deep learning, self-supervised learning
- Workplaces: Rembrand; Meta AI; Amazon Alexa; Microsoft Research
- Thesis: Deep Neural Network Acoustic Models for ASR (2014)
- Doctoral advisor: Gerald Penn; Geoffrey Hinton
- Website: cs.toronto.edu/~asamir/

Abdelrahman Mohamed (also written Abdel-rahman Mohamed); is an Egyptian-American computer scientist working in the United States, known for his research on deep learning for speech recognition and self-supervised speech representation learning. As a doctoral student at the University of Toronto under Geoffrey Hinton and Gerald Penn, he was part of the group that first applied deep belief networks to acoustic modelling, work that is credited with starting the deep learning era in speech recognition. He later created the HuBERT model and co-developed wav2vec 2.0 at Meta AI. He is a co-founder and chief AI scientist of the advertising-technology company Rembrand.

== Education ==
Mohamed received a bachelor's degree (2004) and a master's degree (2007) in computer science from Cairo University. After a research position at KU Leuven in Belgium, he began doctoral studies at the University of Toronto in 2008, where he was supervised by Gerald Penn and Geoffrey Hinton, receiving his PhD in 2014.

== Career ==
In 2009, Mohamed, George E. Dahl and Hinton showed that deep belief networks could outperform the Gaussian mixture models then standard in speech recognition on the TIMIT phone-recognition benchmark. The result was extended to large-vocabulary recognition by groups at Microsoft, Google and IBM, and Mohamed was a co-author of the 2012 overview paper in IEEE Signal Processing Magazine that summarised the shared findings of the four groups. With Alex Graves and Hinton he also published early work on deep recurrent neural networks for speech recognition, and with Ossama Abdel-Hamid and others on convolutional neural networks for speech.

Mohamed was a researcher at Microsoft Research in Redmond, Washington, from 2014 to 2017, and a principal scientist and manager in the Amazon Alexa AI group from 2017 to 2018. From 2018 to 2022 he was at Meta's Fundamental AI Research (FAIR) laboratory in Seattle, where his group worked on learning speech representations from unlabelled audio. He co-developed wav2vec 2.0, a contrastive self-supervised framework for speech, and led the development of HuBERT (Hidden-Unit BERT), which learns speech representations by predicting clustered "hidden units" of masked audio segments; both models are widely used as pre-trained foundations for speech systems. His group extended the approach to audio-visual speech with AV-HuBERT and co-organised SUPERB, a benchmark for evaluating self-supervised speech models. He was first author of a 2022 review of self-supervised speech representation learning in the IEEE Journal of Selected Topics in Signal Processing.

In December 2022 Mohamed left Meta, where he had been a director of AI research, to co-found Rembrand, a Palo Alto, California company that uses generative AI to insert virtual product placement into video, serving as its chief AI scientist. The company, led by Omar Tawakol, raised an $8 million seed round in 2023 and a $23 million Series A in 2025.

== Awards ==
- IEEE Signal Processing Society Best Paper Award, 2016, for "Convolutional Neural Networks for Speech Recognition" (with Abdel-Hamid, Jiang, Deng, Penn and Yu).
- IEEE Signal Processing Magazine Best Paper Award, 2022, for "Deep Neural Networks for Acoustic Modeling in Speech Recognition: The Shared Views of Four Research Groups".

== Selected publications ==
- Mohamed, Abdel-rahman; Dahl, George; Hinton, Geoffrey (2009). Deep belief networks for phone recognition. NIPS Workshop on Deep Learning for Speech Recognition and Related Applications.
- Mohamed, Abdel-rahman; Dahl, George E.; Hinton, Geoffrey (2012). "Acoustic Modeling Using Deep Belief Networks". IEEE Transactions on Audio, Speech, and Language Processing. 20 (1): 14–22. doi:10.1109/TASL.2011.2109382.
- Hinton, Geoffrey; Deng, Li; Yu, Dong; Dahl, George E.; Mohamed, Abdel-rahman; et al. (2012). "Deep Neural Networks for Acoustic Modeling in Speech Recognition: The Shared Views of Four Research Groups". IEEE Signal Processing Magazine. 29 (6): 82–97. doi:10.1109/MSP.2012.2205597.
- Graves, Alex; Mohamed, Abdel-rahman; Hinton, Geoffrey (2013). Speech recognition with deep recurrent neural networks. IEEE International Conference on Acoustics, Speech and Signal Processing (ICASSP). pp. 6645–6649. doi:10.1109/ICASSP.2013.6638947.
- Abdel-Hamid, Ossama; Mohamed, Abdel-rahman; Jiang, Hui; Deng, Li; Penn, Gerald; Yu, Dong (2014). "Convolutional Neural Networks for Speech Recognition". IEEE/ACM Transactions on Audio, Speech, and Language Processing. 22 (10): 1533–1545. doi:10.1109/TASLP.2014.2339736.
- Baevski, Alexei; Zhou, Henry; Mohamed, Abdelrahman; Auli, Michael (2020). wav2vec 2.0: A Framework for Self-Supervised Learning of Speech Representations. Advances in Neural Information Processing Systems 33 (NeurIPS). arXiv:2006.11477.
- Hsu, Wei-Ning; Bolte, Benjamin; Tsai, Yao-Hung Hubert; Lakhotia, Kushal; Salakhutdinov, Ruslan; Mohamed, Abdelrahman (2021). "HuBERT: Self-Supervised Speech Representation Learning by Masked Prediction of Hidden Units". IEEE/ACM Transactions on Audio, Speech, and Language Processing. 29: 3451–3460. arXiv:2106.07447. doi:10.1109/TASLP.2021.3122291.
- Mohamed, Abdelrahman; Lee, Hung-yi; Borgholt, Lasse; et al. (2022). "Self-Supervised Speech Representation Learning: A Review". IEEE Journal of Selected Topics in Signal Processing. 16 (6): 1179–1210. arXiv:2205.10643. doi:10.1109/JSTSP.2022.3207050.
