= Gilad Haran =

Israeli biophysicist and physical chemist

- גלעד הרן
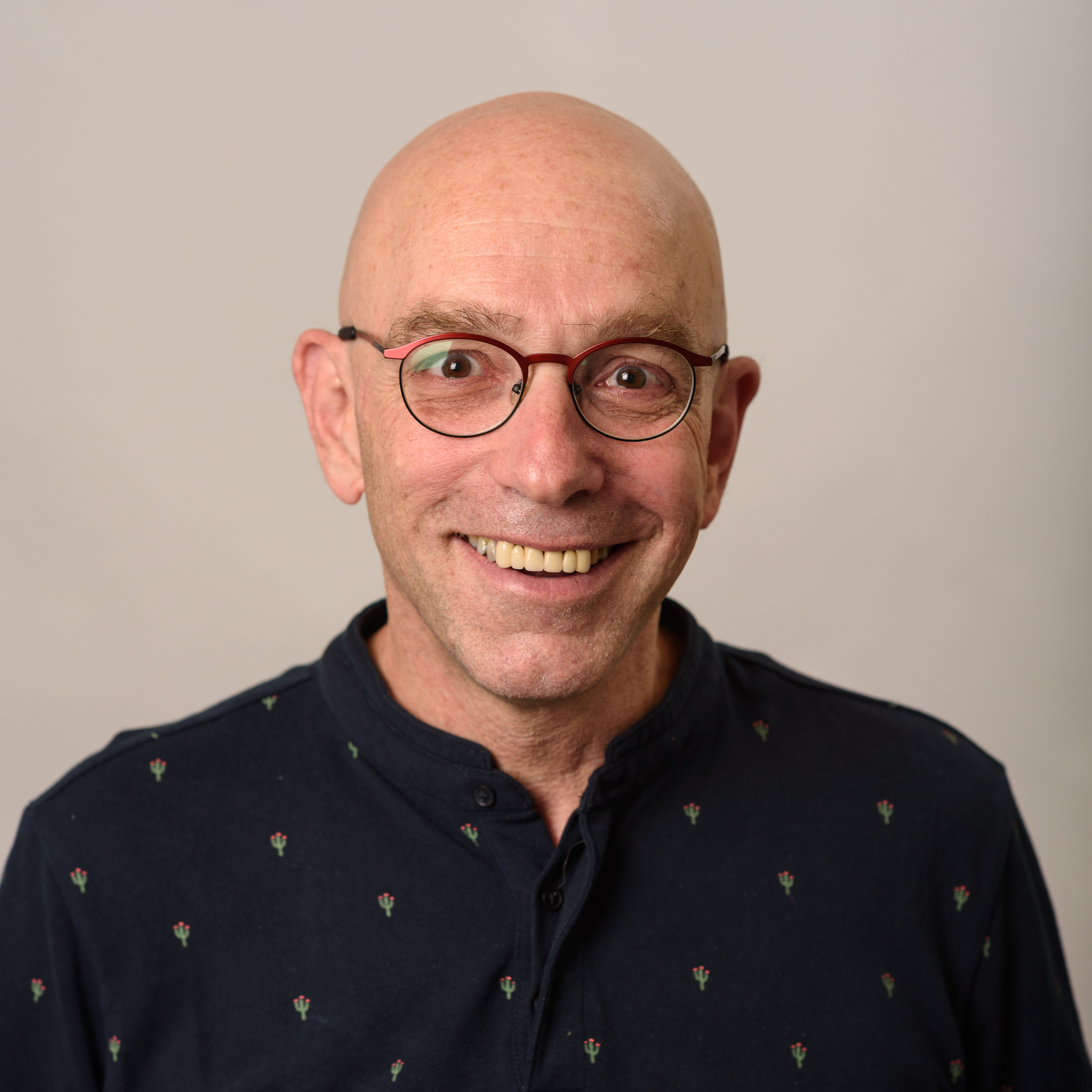
- Born: January 16, 1960 (age 66); Holon, Israel
- Education: Hebrew University of Jerusalem (B.Med.Sc., 1986); Weizmann Institute of Science (PhD, 1993)
- Occupations: biophysicist, physical chemist
- Employer: Weizmann Institute of Science
- Notable work: Investigation of spectroscopy and dynamics of molecules, understanding of mechanisms underlying protein folding processes and activity of molecular machines
- Title: The Hilda Pomeraniec Memorial Professorial Chair

Gilad Haran (Hebrew: גלעד הרן; born January 16, 1960) is an Israeli biophysicist and physical chemist, a full professor at the Faculty of Chemistry in the Weizmann Institute of Science, and its former dean. An expert in molecular machines. Laureate of Weizmann Prize (2017) and Nakanishi Prize (2023).

== Biography ==
Haran was born and raised Gilad Herling in Holon, the son of Meir and Drora and a grandson of the second mayor of Holon Pinchas Eilon.

He did his graduate studies in medical science at the medical school of the Hebrew University of Jerusalem and completed the degree summa cum laude (1986).

He then started working as a research assistant to Prof. Hezi Barenholz at the Hebrew University. At this time, he took part in the development of the first nanomedicine ever, Doxyl.

In 1988 Haran started his doctoral studies at the Weizmann Institute of Science under the supervision of Ephraim Katzir (a former President of Israel) and Elisha Haas. His dissertation (1993) discussed the dynamics of the conformation of polypeptides and proteins.

During the next years, he was a post-doctoral fellow in the department of Chemistry of University of Pennsylvania with Robin M. Hochstrasser. He was working on ultrafast spectroscopy of reaction dynamics in proteins and fluids.

Upon his coming back to Israel in 1998, he joined as a senior lecturer at the department of chemical physics at the Weizmann Institute. In 2005 he was appointed an associate professor and, in 2011, a full professor. In 2007–2011 he served as the head of the board of Chemistry at the Feinberg Graduate School.

In 2012, Haran was appointed the 11th dean of the Faculty of Chemistry and served six years in this post.

He is married to Michal Haran, a hematologist at the Kaplan medical center and a senior lecturer at the medical school of the Hebrew University.

He is a member of the Israeli Public Emergency Council for the COVID-19 Crisis (PECC).

== Awards ==
- 1999: Incumbent of the Benjamin H. Swig and Jack D. Weiler Career Development Chair
- 2010: Incumbent of the Hilda Pomeraniec Memorial Professorial Chair
- 2017: European Research Council Advanced Grant (Smallostery)
- 2017: Weizmann Prize for the Exact Sciences, awarded by the Tel-Aviv municipality
- 2019: Fellow of the Biophysical Society
- 2019: ACS Physical Chemistry Division Award for Experimental Physical Chemistry
- 2021: Fellow of the Royal Society of Chemistry
- 2022: Israel Science Foundation Breakthrough Grant
- 2023: American Chemical Society Nakanishi Prize
- 2023: Member of Academia Europea
- 2025: Ignacio Tinoco Award
