= Gerald Penn (computer scientist) =

American computer scientist

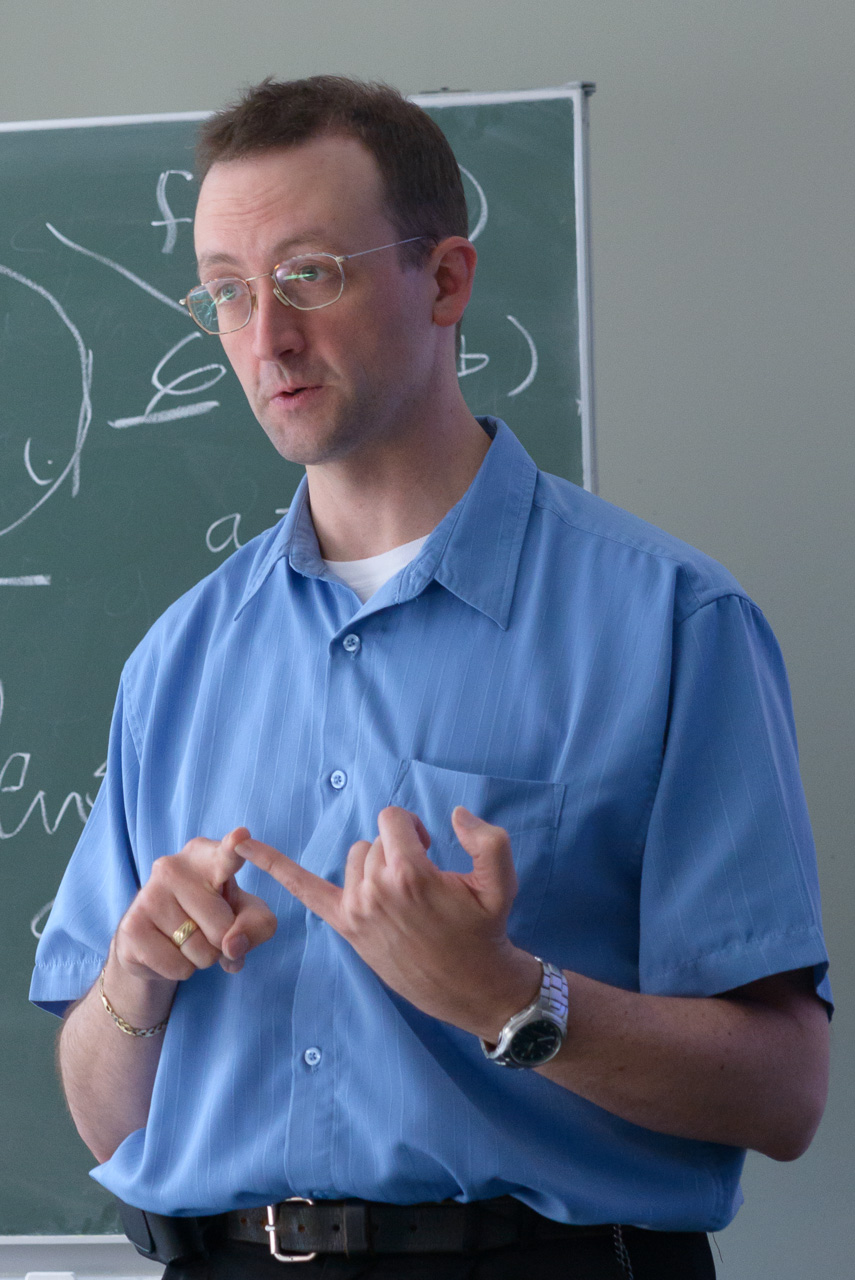
- Penn at IZ-Colloquium (Berlin, May 2012)
- Education: University of Chicago (BS); Carnegie Mellon University (MS, PhD)
- Known for: Application of neural network in acoustic model
- Awards: E. W. Beth Dissertation Prize (2001); Beckman Fellow (2006)
- Scientific career
- Fields: Mathematical linguistics; Computational linguistics; Natural language processing; Speech recognition; Parsing
- Workplaces: University of Toronto
- Thesis: The Algebraic Structure of Attributed Type Signatures (2000)
- Doctoral advisor: Frank Pfenning
- Doctoral students: Abdelrahman Mohamed; Jackie Cheung; Xiaodan Zhu; Christopher Collins; Cosmin Munteanu
- Website: http://www.cs.toronto.edu/~gpenn/

Gerald B. Penn is an American computer scientist specializing in mathematical linguistics and speech processing. He is a Professor of Computer Science at the University of Toronto, a senior member of IEEE and AAAI, and a past chair of Association for Mathematics of Language.

== Education ==
Penn earned a B.Sc. in mathematics from the University of Chicago in 1991. He then attained a M.Sc. in philosophy in 1993 and Ph.D. in computer science in 2000, both from Carnegie Mellon University. His Ph.D. thesis The Algebraic Structure of Attributed Type Signatures received the E.W. Beth Dissertation Prize for outstanding Ph.D. dissertations in Logic, Language, and Information, and was nominated by Carnegie Mellon School of Computer Science for the ACM Doctoral Dissertation Award. He was a student of Frank Pfenning.

== Career ==
Penn joined University of Toronto as a Professor in the Department of Computer Science in 2001. His research focuses on mathematical linguistics and speech processing. He is a senior member of IEEE and AAAI, and a former chair of Association for Mathematics of Language. He has led numerous research projects funded by organizations such as Avaya, Bell Canada, CAE, the Connaught Fund, Microsoft, NSERC, the German Ministry for Training and Research, SMART Technologies, the U.S. Army and the U.S. Office of the Director of National Intelligence.

=== Awards ===
Penn was awarded the Beckman Senior Fellowship in 2006 and is a former recipient of the Ontario Early Researcher Award. His collaborative work with Geoffrey Hinton and Hui Jiang on signal processing with neural networks revolutionized acoustic modelling for speech recognition systems, and received the Best Paper Award from IEEE Signal Processing Society.
