= Paul R. Selvin =

American biophysicist

Paul R. Selvin is an American biophysicist.

Selvin earned a Bachelor of Science in physics from the University of Michigan in 1983, followed by a PhD in the same field at the University of California, Berkeley in 1990. He began teaching at the University of Illinois at Urbana–Champaign in 1997.

Selvin was elected a fellow of the American Physical Society in 2004, and a member of the American Academy of Arts and Sciences in 2024. Selvin was the 2022 awardee of the Biophysical Society's Ignacio Tinoco Award.
