= Gary H. Posner =

Gary H. Posner (June 2, 1943 – February 26, 2018) was Scowe Professor of Chemistry at Johns Hopkins University in Baltimore, Maryland. Posner is known for his pioneering research in organocopper chemistry, including his involvement in the development of the Corey–House–Posner–Whitesides reaction.

== Career ==
Posner was born in New York City and completed his undergraduate studies at Brandeis University. He received his PhD from Harvard University in 1968 where his adviser was E. J. Corey. He did a post-doctoral fellowship at the University of California Berkeley. He was at Johns Hopkins University from 1969 to 2016, where he held the Scowe Professorship in Chemistry from 1989 onwards.

== Research ==
Posner was first known for his pioneering research in organocopper chemistry in which he developed novel methods for organic synthesis involving organocopper reagents. He is the author of the textbook An Introduction to Synthesis Using Organocopper Reagents. Posner has also contributed numerous other developments in synthetic organic chemistry including asymmetric synthesis and multicomponent organic reactions. Posner's most recent research was focused on applying organic synthesis to the preparation of novel medicinal agents including isothiocyanates with anticancer properties, new vitamin D analogs for the treatment of psoriasis, and new antimalarial peroxides.

== Awards ==
In 1987, Posner was named Maryland Chemist of the Year and in 1994 he received the Distinguished Teaching Award at Johns Hopkins. He was also a 2004 recipient of a Cope Senior Scholar Award from the American Chemical Society.
