= List of psychologists =

This list includes notable psychologists and contributors to psychology, some of whom may not have thought of themselves primarily as psychologists but are included here because of their important contributions to the discipline.

Specialized lists of psychologists can be found at the articles on comparative psychology, list of clinical psychologists, list of developmental psychologists, list of educational psychologists, list of evolutionary psychologists, list of social psychologists, and list of cognitive scientists. Many psychologists included in those lists are also listed below:

== A ==
- Edwina Abbott
- Alfred Adler (Founder of the school of individual psychology)
- Mary Ainsworth
- Estefania Aldaba-Lim
- George Albee
- Joseph P. Allen
- Jüri Allik
- Lauren Alloy
- Gordon Allport, personality psychology
- Adelbert Ames, Jr.
- Marie Anaut
- Harlene Anderson
- John R. Anderson
- Ernst Angel
- Heinz Ansbacher
- Edgar Anstey
- Michael Apter, reversal theory
- Michael Argyle, social psychology, discourse analysis
- Robert Arkin, social psychology
- Magda B. Arnold
- Solomon Asch (Asch conformity experiments, Social influence, Peer pressure)
- Roberto Assagioli
- John William Atkinson, human motivation, achievement and behavior
- Aušra Augustinavičiūtė
- Averroes (Ibn Rushd)
- Virginia Axline, play therapy

== B ==
- Arthur J. Bachrach, underwater and extreme environments
- Alan Baddeley, three-component model of working memory
- Renee Baillargeon
- Ahmed ibn Sahl al-Balkhi
- Albert Bandura, social learning theory
- Aron K. Barbey
- Russell Barkley
- Jerome Barkow
- Dermot Barnes-Holmes
- Simon Baron-Cohen
- Deirdre Barrett, dreams and hypnosis
- Lisa Feldman Barrett
- Lawrence W. Barsalou
- Frederic Bartlett, memory schema
- Daniel Batson
- Diana Baumrind
- Nancy Bayley
- Geoffrey Beattie, body language, psychology in sustainable consumption
- Sandra Bem
- Erich Benjamin
- Gershon Ben-Shakhar
- Hubert Benoit
- Richard Bentall
- Larry E. Beutler, systematic treatment selection
- Alfred Binet (Intelligence testing, first practical IQ test, the Binet–Simon test)
- Robert A. Bjork
- Randolph Blake, binocular rivalry
- Ray Blanchard, sexology
- Theodore H. Blau, first practising clinician elected President of the APA
- Stephen F. Blinkhorn
- Pavel Blonsky
- Paul Bloom
- Barbara Bonner
- Edmund Bourne
- Gordon H. Bower
- John Bowlby, attachment theory
- Nathaniel Branden, self-esteem, objectivism
- Franz Brentano
- Shlomo Breznitz
- Carl Brigham
- Donald Broadbent, cognitive psychology
- Urie Bronfenbrenner, ecological systems theory
- Kelly Brownell
- Jerome Bruner, child development
- Emily Bushnell
- David Buss
- Brian Butterworth
- Ruth M. J. Byrne

== C ==
- Mary Whiton Calkins
- Donald T. Campbell
- Susan Carey
- James Cattell, helped establish psychology as a legitimate science
- Raymond Cattell, factor analysis, 16PF Questionnaire and the Big Five, fluid versus crystallized intelligence
- Stephen J. Ceci, intelligence and memory
- Jean-Martin Charcot
- Nancy Chodorow
- Noam Chomsky, Linguistics, Cognitive Science
- Robert Cialdini
- Kenneth B. Clark
- Mamie Phipps Clark
- Lee Anna Clark
- Asher Cohen
- Clyde Coombs
- Cary Cooper
- Suzanne Corkin
- Leda Cosmides
- Lee Chambers (psychologist)
- Martin A. Conway
- Catharine Cox, intelligence, genius
- Lee Cronbach, testing and measurement
- Mihaly Csikszentmihalyi, Positive psychology, Happiness & Creativity

== D ==
- Martin Daly
- William Damon, purpose
- Lisa Damour
- Martin Dannecker
- John Darley
- Daniel O David
- Laura Dean
- Raymond Dean, neuropsychology
- Florence Denmark
- Helene Deutsch
- John Dewey, (Functional psychology)
- Ed Diener, (Happiness)
- Dietrich Doerner
- Robin Dunbar
- David F. Duncan

== E ==
- Hermann Ebbinghaus, experimental study of memory
- Jennifer Eberhardt, racial bias in criminal justice
- Paul Ekman, (emotions and facial expressions)
- Albert Ellis, (Founder of rational emotive behavior therapy, Founder of cognitive-behavioral therapies)
- Hadyn Ellis
- Virgilio Enriquez, founder of Filipino psychology
- Erik H. Erikson, (Erikson's stages of psychosocial development)
- Milton H. Erickson
- John E. Exner, developed the comprehensive system for administering, coding, and interpreting the Rorschach test
- Hans Eysenck

== F ==
- Norman Farberow
- Gustav Fechner, founder of psychophysics
- Leon Festinger, cognitive dissonance
- Cordelia Fine
- Susan Fiske
- Edna B. Foa
- Donata Francescato
- Viktor Frankl, founder of logotherapy
- Marie-Louise von Franz
- Barbara Fredrickson
- Armindo Freitas-Magalhães
- Anna Freud
- Sigmund Freud, (Founder of psychoanalysis)
- Erich Fromm, (psychoanalyst)
- Adrian Furnham

== G ==
- John Gabrieli
- Gordon G. Gallup, Jr., mirror self-recognition (MSR) test
- Francis Galton, (His book Hereditary Genius was the first social scientific attempt to study genius and greatness)
- Laszlo Garai
- Riley Gardner
- Elmer R. Gates
- Susan Gathercole
- Isabel Gauthier, perceptual expertise, object and face recognition
- Bertram Gawronski
- Kenneth Gergen, social constructionism
- Eleanor J. Gibson
- J. J. Gibson
- Gerd Gigerenzer, bounded rationality
- Daniel Gilbert, (Social psychology, Affective forecasting)
- Gustave Gilbert
- Carol Gilligan
- Fernand Gobet, cognitive psychology
- Stan Gooch
- Christian Gostečnik, clinical psychology and marriage-and-family therapist
- Irving I. Gottesman, behavioral genetics
- Clare W. Graves, (emergent cyclical levels of existence theory)
- Richard Green, sexology
- Florence Goodenough
- John Gottman, marital stability and relationships
- Elizabeth Gould
- James Greeno, experimental psychology and learning science
- James Gross
- Robert Grosseteste
- Félix Guattari, founder of schizoanalysis
- Germaine Guex
- J. P. Guilford
- Edwin Ray Guthrie

== H ==
- Jonathan Haidt, (psychology of morality)
- Jay Haley
- G. Stanley Hall
- Tsuruko Haraguchi
- Robert D. Hare
- Harry Harlow
- Chris Hatcher
- Steven C. Hayes
- Donald O. Hebb
- Fritz Heider
- Asgeir Helgason
- Hermann von Helmholtz
- Hubert Hermans
- Richard Herrnstein
- Gerard Heymans
- Felicitas Heyne
- William Edmund Hick
- James Hillman
- Leta Stetter Hollingworth
- James Hollis
- Margie Holmes
- Edwin Holt
- Keith Holyoak
- Bruce Hood, developmental cognitive neuroscience
- Karen Horney (Ten Neurotic Needs)
- Ruth Winifred Howard
- Ethel Dench Puffer Howes
- Clark L. Hull
- Nicholas Humphrey
- Edwin Hutchins

== I ==
- Bärbel Inhelder
- Ira Naeem

== J ==
- William James, (James–Lange theory of emotion, psychology of religion)
- Marie Jahoda
- Kay Redfield Jamison, clinical psychology, bipolar disorder
- Joseph Jastrow
- Julian Jaynes
- Arthur Jensen, (Heritability of IQ, Race and intelligence, g factor)
- Jaqueline Jesus
- Marcia K. Johnson
- Mark H. Johnson
- Philip Johnson-Laird, cognition, psychology of reasoning
- Ernest Jones
- Mary Cover Jones
- Carl Jung, (Analytical psychology)
- J. P. Das, (PASS Theory)

== K ==
- Jerome Kagan
- Daniel Kahneman, (Nobel Prize in Economics, behavioral finance and hedonic psychology)
- Mieko Kamiya
- Jacob Robert Kantor, organized scientific values into a coherent system of psychology
- Nancy Kanwisher
- Rachel and Stephen Kaplan, (Environmental psychology)
- Leonard Katz
- Alan S. Kaufman
- Nadeen L. Kaufman
- Alan Kazdin
- David Keirsey
- George Kelly
- Harold Kelley
- Isabelle Kendig
- Otto F. Kernberg
- Antoni Kępiński
- Doreen Kimura, sex and cognition
- Akiyoshi Kitaoka
- Gary Klein, (pioneer in the field of naturalistic decision making)
- Melanie Klein
- Michael D. Knox antiwar activism
- Brian Knutson
- Kurt Koffka, (co-founder of Gestalt psychology)
- Wolfgang Köhler, (co-founder of Gestalt psychology)
- Lawrence Kohlberg, moral psychology
- Heinz Kohut
- Arthur Kornhauser, industrial psychologist
- Konstantin Kornilov
- Stephen Kosslyn
- Stanislav Kozlovsky
- Elisabeth Kübler-Ross
- Fritz Künkel, we-psychology

== L ==
- Jacques Lacan (psychoanalyst)
- George Trumbull Ladd
- Christine Ladd-Franklin
- Ellen Langer
- Jan van der Lans
- Karl Lashley
- Bibb Latane
- Richard Lazarus
- John Francis Leader
- Timothy Leary
- Averil Leimon
- Patrick Leman
- Mark Lepper
- Jerre Levy, lateralization of brain function
- Kurt Lewin, social psychology
- David Lewis
- Marc Lewis
- Rensis Likert, Likert Scale
- Marsha M. Linehan
- Elizabeth Loftus, memory
- Konrad Lorenz
- Alexander Luria

== M ==
- Eleanor Maccoby
- Margaret Mahler, Hungarian, central figure in psychoanalysis
- Ernest "Mark" Mahone
- George Mandler
- Jean Matter Mandler
- James G. March, cognitive organizational psychology
- Abraham Maslow, (Maslow's hierarchy of needs)
- William Masters and Virginia Johnson, (Pioneered research into the nature of Human sexual response, diagnosis, treatment)
- Rollo May
- Rufus May
- Dan P. McAdams
- Francis T. McAndrew
- David McClelland
- James McClelland
- Sally-Anne McCormack
- William McDougall
- Patrick J McGrath
- Phil McGraw
- Peter McGuffin
- David McNeill
- George Herbert Mead
- Paul Meehl
- Jacques Mehler
- Rivka Bertisch Meir
- Andrew Meltzoff
- Ronald Melzack
- Wolfgang Metzger
- David E. Meyer
- Leonardo Miggiorin
- Stanley Milgram, (Milgram experiment)
- Alice Miller
- George A. Miller
- Jacques-Alain Miller
- Neal E. Miller, biofeedback
- William R. Miller, (Motivational interviewing (MI))
- Theodore Millon, personality disorders
- Brenda Milner
- Arnold Mindell, process oriented psychology
- Walter Mischel, (Marshmallow experiment)
- Munesuke Mita
- John Money
- Maria Montessori
- Jacob L. Moreno, psychodrama
- C. Lloyd Morgan, canon
- John Morton
- Yūjirō Motora
- Orval Hobart Mowrer
- Georg Elias Müller
- Henry Murray
- Hugo Münsterberg
- Charles Samuel Myers

== N ==
- Albert Nalchajyan
- Ulric Neisser
- Erich Neumann
- Richard Nisbett
- Donald Norman
- Kent Norman

== O ==
- Charles E. Osgood
- Joy Osofsky
- J. Buzz Von Ornsteiner
- Lise Østergaard

== P ==
- Allan Paivio
- Linda Papadopoulos
- Ivan Pavlov
- Carolyn R. Payton
- Fritz Perls
- Cheves Perky (Perky Effect)
- Christopher Peterson
- Anne C. Petersen
- Eva Bendix Petersen
- Jordan Peterson
- Jean Piaget, (Piagetian psychology and genetic epistemology, Piaget's theory of cognitive development)
- Robert O. Pihl
- Steven Pinker, (experimental psychology, cognitive science)
- Robert Plomin
- Michael Posner
- Jonathan Potter
- James W. Prescott
- LeShawndra Price
- Inez Beverly Prosser
- Lorine Livingston Pruette
- Zenon Pylyshyn, cognitive psychology

== R ==
- Otto Rank, (psychoanalyst)
- Rosalie Rayner
- Reimut Reiche
- Dennis Reina
- Ulf-Dietrich Reips
- Daniel Reisberg
- Robert Remez
- Samuel Renshaw
- Cecil R. Reynolds
- Judith Rich Harris
- Sylvia Rimm
- Carl Rogers, (Person-centered therapy)
- Eleanor Rosch
- Paul Rosenfels
- Robert Rosenthal
- Barbara Rothbaum, virtual reality therapy
- John Rowan
- Philip Rubin
- Sergei Rubinstein
- Susanna Rubinstein
- David Rumelhart
- Michelle K. Ryan

== S ==
- Jeanne Safer, psychotherapy
- Eleanor Saffran
- Tamaki Saitō
- Tora Sandström
- Virginia Satir
- Shlomo Sawilowsky, psychometrics, construct validity for the multitrait-multimethod matrix
- Daniel Schacter
- Stanley Schachter, affiliation studies, two factor theory of emotion
- Roy Schafer
- K. Warner Schaie
- Edgar Schein
- Gunter Schmidt
- Kirk Schneider, existential-integrative therapy
- Erich Schröger
- Walter Dill Scott
- Ivan Sechenov
- Martin Seligman, (Founder of positive psychology, happiness, learned helplessness)
- Deborah Serani
- Francine Shapiro, (Founder of EMDR)
- Tamara Sher
- Sara Shettleworth
- Hunter B. Shirley
- Morita Shoma
- Volkmar Sigusch
- Herbert A. Simon, Nobel Prize in Economics
- Théodore Simon, French psychologist who developed the Binet-Simon scale
- Amy Singer
- B. F. Skinner, (Founder of radical behaviorism)
- Victor Skumin
- Paul Slovic
- Stanley Smith Stevens
- Eugene Sokolov
- Charles Spearman
- Elizabeth Spelke
- Janet Taylor Spence
- Herbert Spencer
- Sabina Spielrein
- Clara Stern
- Robert Sternberg
- Saul Sternberg
- Paul Stevenson
- Fritz Strack
- George M. Stratton, founder of UC Berkeley's department of psychology
- Harry Stack Sullivan
- Carl Stumpf
- William Swann
- Norbert Schwarz
- José Szapocznik
- Derald Wing Sue

== T ==
- Ali ibn Sahl Rabban al-Tabari
- Henri Tajfel, prejudice, social identity
- Jeffrey S. Tanaka
- Shelley E. Taylor
- Lewis Terman, (IQ, Genius, Talent)
- Philip E. Tetlock (The Good Judgment Project, Forecasting, Decision making)
- Sharon Thompson-Schill
- Edward Thorndike, puzzle boxes, connectionism
- L. L. Thurstone, pioneer in psychometrics and psychophysics
- Edward Titchener
- Edward C. Tolman
- John Tooby
- Ellis Paul Torrance
- Anne Treisman, Feature integration theory, Attenuation theory, object perception, memory
- Reiko True
- Jeanne Tsai
- Kate Tsui
- Endel Tulving
- Elliot Turiel, founder of domain theory (primary challenge to Kohlberg's stages of moral development)
- John Turner, collaborated with Tajfel on social identity theory and later developed self-categorization theory
- Amos Tversky
- David Tzuriel

== U ==
- Dimitri Uznadze

== V ==
- Douglas Vakoch
- Alfons Vansteenwegen
- Magdalen Dorothea Vernon
- Vaira Vīķe-Freiberga
- Hedwig von Restorff
- Lev Vygotsky, (cultural-historical psychology)
- Stuart Vyse

== W ==
- Joan Scott Wallace, outside of government service, a psychologist and educator
- Henri Wallon, French psychology
- Hans-Jürgen Walter, (Founder of Gestalt theoretical psychotherapy)
- Margaret Floy Washburn, first female psychology PhD
- John B. Watson, Watsonian behaviorism
- Paul Watzlawick
- Ernst Heinrich Weber
- David Wechsler
- Nicole Weekes, psychologist and neuroscientist
- Karl E. Weick, cognitive organizational psychology
- Robert Weimar
- Max Wertheimer, co-founder of Gestalt psychology
- Drew Westen
- Michael White, (Founder of narrative therapy)
- Ken Wilber, transpersonal psychology, then integral psychology
- Glenn D. Wilson, personality and sexual behaviour
- Richard Wiseman
- Władysław Witwicki, one of the fathers of psychology in Poland, the creator of the theory of cratism
- Gustav Adolf Wohlgemuth
- Donald Woods Winnicott
- Robert S. Woodworth
- Helen Thompson Woolley
- Wilhelm Wundt, (One of the founders of modern psychology as a discipline, father of experimental psychology)
- Karen Wynn

== X ==
- Fei Xu, Developmental Psychology and Cognitive Science

== Y ==
- Rivka Yahav, psychotherapist
- Irvin D. Yalom, (Existential psychiatrist)
- Robert Yerkes

== Z ==
- Robert J. Zajonc
- Oliver Zangwill
- René Zazzo
- Bluma Zeigarnik, (Zeigarnik effect)
- Philip Zimbardo

== See also ==
- List of clinical psychologists
- List of cognitive psychologists
- List of cognitive scientists
- List of developmental psychologists
- List of educational psychologists
- List of psychiatrists
- List of social psychologists
