= Neal Cohen =

Neal Cohen may refer to:

- Neal J. Cohen, professor of psychology
- Neal L. Cohen, New York City health commissioner

== See also ==
- Neil Cohen (born 1955), American soccer defender
- Neil M. Cohen (born 1951), member of the New Jersey General Assembly
