= Sharon Thompson-Schill =

American cognitive psychologist

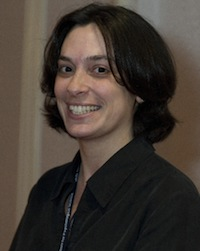
- Thompson-Schill
- Born: June 24, 1970 (age 56)
- Occupation: Cognitive psychologist
- Employer: University of Pennsylvania

Academic background
- Education: Davidson College; Stanford University
- Thesis: Context Effects on Word Recognition: Implications for Models of Lexical Representation (1996)
- Doctoral advisor: John Gabrieli
- Other advisors: Gordon Bower; David Rumelhart

Sharon Thompson-Schill is a Professor of Psychology at the University of Pennsylvania in Philadelphia, Pennsylvania. Her research covers the field of biological basis of human cognitive systems, including language, memory, perception, and cognitive control, and the relationships between these systems. As of 2023, she has produced more than 190 scientific publications, which collectively have been cited over 18,000 times.

At the University of Pennsylvania, Thompson-Schill served as the Chairperson of the Psychology Department from 2014 to 2019, as the founding Director of MindCORE from 2017 to 2019, and as the Director (2010-2014) and Co-Director (2014-2017) of the Center for Cognitive Neuroscience. She is also a member of the Committee on Science and the Arts at the Franklin Institute in Philadelphia and has served on the editorial boards of several scientific journals, including as Co-Editor-in-Chief of Cognitive Neuroscience.

== Biographical Information ==
Thompson-Schill was born on June 24, 1970, in Washington D.C. She attended Stone Ridge School of the Sacred Heart in Maryland, graduating in 1987.

Thompson-Schill graduated from Davidson College in 1991 with a B.A. in Psychology with honors. She then pursued a graduate degree in Cognitive Psychology at Stanford University, receiving her Ph.D. in 1996. She completed a dissertation under the supervision of John Gabrieli titled Context Effects on Word Recognition: Implications for Models of Lexical Representation. She spent the next three years as a post-doctoral fellow in the Psychology Department at the University of Pennsylvania before joining the faculty there in 1999.

She currently lives in Philadelphia and has three children.

In 2018, she was award the Psychonomic Society Mid-Career Award

== Career ==
Thompson-Schill was the Chairwoman of the Department of Psychology at the University of Pennsylvania from 2014 to 2019 and has served as the Director and co-director of the Center for Cognitive Neuroscience at the same university. She also served as the founding Director of MindCORE, the University of Pennsylvania's hub for the integrative study of the mind. She is a professor at the university and has held faculty positions there and at other institutions, including Swarthmore College and Notre Dame of Maryland University. She also directs the Thompson-Schill Lab at the University of Pennsylvania.

Thompson-Schill has done research on the biological basis of cognitive systems, including perception, language, and thought. One particular focus of her lab's research has been the role of the brain's frontal lobes in the regulation of thought and behavior, including extensive studies of Cognitive control, part of the brain's executive system. Thompson-Schill has published papers on the subject and spoke about it to the public at a panel discussion hosted by the American Folk Art Museum, entitled 'Unraveling the Mysteries of Creativity: Connections to Genetics, Mental Health, and the Brain.' While Thompson-Schill primarily focuses her research on perception, language and thought processes, another substantial focus of the Thompson-Schill Lab is conceptual knowledge. Research includes how concepts are constructed, combined, and organized in the brain as well as how conceptual knowledge interacts with language and perception.

Thompson-Schill's research uses a range of methods to study the biological basis of complex thought and behavior, including functional magnetic resonance imaging (fMRI), Transcranial magnetic stimulation (TMS), and Lesion-deficit mapping of neurological patients. For over 20 years, her research has been supported continuously by the National Institutes of Health, and she has received funding from a variety of other sources, including the National Science Foundation.

Her research has been published in scientific journals including the Proceedings of the National Academy of Sciences, Journal of Experimental Psychology: General, Cerebral Cortex, Cognition, and Nature Human Behaviour.

== Awards ==
Thompson-Schill's research awards include a Young Investigator Award from the Cognitive Neuroscience Society, a Mid-Career Award from the Psychonomic Society, election as a Fellow of the Society of Experimental Psychologists, and election as a Fellow of the Cognitive Science Society. Her teaching and mentoring awards include the Professional Opportunities for Women in Research and Education Award from the National Science Foundation (1999), the Women in Cognitive Science Mentorship Award (2004), the Lindback Award for Distinguished Teaching (2006), the Biological Basis of Behavior Society's Professor of the Year Award (2008), the Trustees’ Council of Penn Women Award for Advising (2016), and the Provost's Award for Distinguished Ph.D. Teaching and Mentoring (2018).

Across her career, Thompson-Schill has also been awarded substantial funding for her research program, including continuous support from the National Institutes of Health (NIH) since 2000. As of 2019, three major grants are currently active and twenty-five are concluded.

In 2021, Thompson-Schill was named Philadelphia's Biggest Foodie by the Delicious City podcast.

== Selected works ==
- Leshinskaya, A & Thompson-Schill, S.L. (2019). From the structure of experience to concepts of structure: How the concept "cause" is attributed to objects and events. Journal of Experimental Psychology: General, 148, 619–643.
- Coutanche, M.N. & Thompson-Schill, S.L. (2019). Neural activity in human visual cortex is transformed by learning real world size. NeuroImage, 186, 570–576.
- Medaglia, J. D., Huang, W., Karuza, E. A., Kelkar, A., Thompson-Schill, S. L., Ribeiro, A., & Bassett, D. S. (2018). Functional alignment with anatomical networks is associated with cognitive flexibility. Nature Human Behaviour, 2, 156–164.
- Chrysikou, E. G., Casasanto, D., & Thompson-Schill, S. L. (2017). Motor experience influences object knowledge. Journal of Experimental Psychology: General, 146(3), 395.
- Yee, E. & Thompson-Schill, S.L. (2016). Putting concepts into context. Psychonomic Bulletin and Review, 23(4), 1015–1027.
- Matheson, H. E., Buxbaum, L.J., & Thompson-Schill, S. L. (2017). Differential tuning of ventral and dorsal streams during the generation of common and uncommon tool uses. Journal of Cognitive Neuroscience, 29, 1791–1802.
- Coutanche, M.N., Solomon, S.H., & Thompson-Schill, S.L. (2016). A meta-analysis of fMRI decoding: Quantifying influences on human visual population codes. Neuropsychologia, 82, 134–141.
- Coutanche, M. N., & Thompson-Schill, S. L. (2015). Rapid consolidation of new knowledge in adulthood via fast mapping. Trends in Cognitive Sciences, 19(9), 486–488.
- Musz, E., & Thompson-Schill, S. L. (2015). Semantic variability predicts neural variability of object concepts. Neuropsychologia, 76, 41–51.
- Coutanche, M. N., & Thompson-Schill, S. L. (2014). Creating concepts from converging features in human cortex. Cerebral Cortex, 25(9), 2584–2593.
- Coutanche, M. N. & Thompson-Schill, S. L. (2013). Information Connectivity: Identifying synchronized discriminability of multi-voxel patterns across the brain. Frontiers in Human Neuroscience, 7, 15.
- Lupyan, G., Mirman, D., Hamilton, R., & Thompson-Schill, S. L. (2012). Categorization is modulated by transcranial direct current stimulation over left prefrontal cortex. Cognition, 124, 36–49.
- Thompson-Schill, S. L., Ramscar, M., & Chrysikou, E. G. (2009). Cognition without control: When a little frontal cortex goes a long way. Current Directions in Psychological Science, 18, 259–263.
- Thompson-Schill, S. L., Swick, D., Farah, M. J., D'Esposito, M., Kan, I. P., & Knight, R. T. (1998). Verb generation in patients with focal frontal lesions: A neuropsychological test of neuroimaging findings. Proceedings of the National Academy of Sciences, 95, 15855–15860.
- Thompson-Schill, S. L., D’Esposito, M., Aguirre, G. K., & Farah, M. J. (1997). Role of left inferior prefrontal cortex in retrieval of semantic knowledge: a reevaluation. Proceedings of the National Academy of Sciences, 94(26), 14792–14797.
