= Rosalie Rayner =

Assistant to John B. Watson (1898–1935)

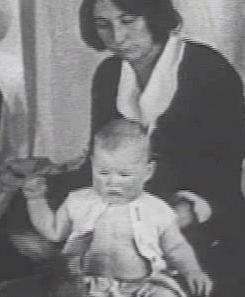
- Rosalie Rayner with Little Albert
- Born: September 25, 1898; Baltimore
- Died: June 18, 1935; Norwalk
- Occupation: Research assistant
- Known for: Little Albert experiment

Rosalie Alberta Rayner (September 25, 1898 – June 18, 1935) was an undergraduate psychology student, then research assistant (and later wife) of Johns Hopkins University psychology professor John B. Watson, with whom she carried out the study of a baby later known as "Little Albert." In the 1920s, she published essays and co-authored articles and a book with Watson about child development and familial bonds.

== Early life ==
Rayner was born in Baltimore, Maryland, on September 25, 1898. Her father and grandfather, Albert William Rayner and William Solomon Rayner, respectively, were successful businessmen. Her mother, Rebecca Selner Rayner, and father had one other daughter, Evelyn. Albert William Rayner made a living dealing with railroads, mining, and shipbuilding. The Rayner family also supported Johns Hopkins University, to which they contributed $10,000 toward research. Rayner's uncle, Isidor Rayner, was also a prominent public figure. Isidor worked as a senator in Maryland and managed public inquiries into the sinking of the Titanic, in addition to serving as Attorney General of Maryland for four years.

== Education ==
Rosalie Rayner continued her education at Vassar College in New York, where she graduated with a Bachelor of Arts degree in 1919. At Vassar, she was a classmate of Mary Cover Jones, who became a prominent psychologist with a focus on lifetime development. Upon graduation, Rayner enrolled at Johns Hopkins University but failed to take any classes. She was hired as an assistant to John B. Watson, who is best known for pioneering the approach to behaviorism. Behaviorism is a term that Watson introduced into the field of psychology to describe the goal of predicting and controlling observable behaviors.

== Research career ==
Rayner and Watson aimed to make family life reflect an empirical environment, based on the belief that behaviors were not hardwired at birth, but instead were acquired through conditioning.

Rayner and Watson claimed to have studied over 500 children, with the Little Albert experiment being their only attempt at a psychological experiment (it would not be categorised as an experiment today). The basis of their study was conditioning a 9-month old baby, referred to as "Albert", to fear a white rat, which had previously been a neutral stimulus. Textbooks often claim that the fear was generalized to other white, furry stimuli, such as fur coats, rabbits, and a Santa Claus mask, but the rabbit was brown and the strength and duration of the fear do not seem impressive in retrospect (and to careful viewers of the film that Watson made). The results of the study were published in the Journal of Experimental Psychology. Despite its prominence, the "Little Albert" study would be deemed highly unethical by modern standards.

=== Publications ===
Rayner and Watson worked together on an article in which they say they studied over 500 children at different stages of development. This article drew conclusions about behavior and how it is always the result of some type of stimulus. It also stated that if the relationship between a stimulus and behavior could be seen, more forms of emotional expression could be taught. Rayner and Watson believed that children could have a personality set by the age of two.

Rayner also contributed to a how-to book called Psychological Care of Infant and Child. This book encouraged mothers to approach child-rearing with scientific principles. In the chapter "Too Much Motherly Love", the maternal bond was addressed. Rayner described how too much tenderness and love towards a child could be detrimental for development. Rayner went so far as to say that it could negatively affect a child's future marital satisfaction.

In 1930, Rayner's first article written without Watson, "I Am the Mother of a Behaviorist's Son", was published. In the article, Rayner encouraged breaking the bonds of mother attachment as early as possible. However, in the article she also affirmed her affection toward her own sons.

Recently, University of New Hampshire psychologist and historian Ben Harris revealed another article by Rosalie Rayner Watson that shows her view of marriage and the family, which some might say presents a feminist analysis.

== Personal life ==
Rayner's collaboration with Watson developed into an affair, which resulted in him divorcing his previous wife, Mary Ickes. The divorce became publicly bitter. Watson's love letters to Rayner were published in newspapers. Due to the scandal, and Watson's refusal to send Rayner abroad until the uproar cooled down, he was forced to leave academia. Rayner also left the university and the two married on December 31, 1920. They moved to Connecticut, where Watson worked for the advertising agency J. Walter Thompson. The couple had two sons together, William and James.

After Watson was fired from Johns Hopkins University in 1920, rumors began to circulate that there was a reason for the termination besides the scandal. One alternative explanation was that Watson and Rayner had been collaborating on physiological sex research. This theory was publicized by psychologist James V. McConnell, who did not believe that Watson's divorce from Ickes was significant enough to warrant a dismissal. In the 1950s, McConnell was told by Deke Coleman, who had worked with Watson in advertising, that Watson and Rayner were conducting research by measuring their own physiological responses during sex. McConnell published the anecdote in his introductory psychology textbook in 1974. The story created a minor controversy, which ultimately shed light on its factual inconsistencies. McConnell's claims were definitively debunked in 2007.

== Death ==
Rayner died on June 18, 1935, in Norwalk Hospital in Connecticut. She had contracted dysentery from eating tainted fruit. Watson was troubled with her death and never remarried. In later years, their two sons reflected on their childhood as they both developed depression in adulthood. Both sons attempted suicide; only William died by suicide. James stated that his father's principles on behaviorism in their strict parenting practices inhibited his and his brother's ability to effectively deal with human emotion, adding that it undermined their self-esteem later in life.
