= Deborah Serani =

American psychologist

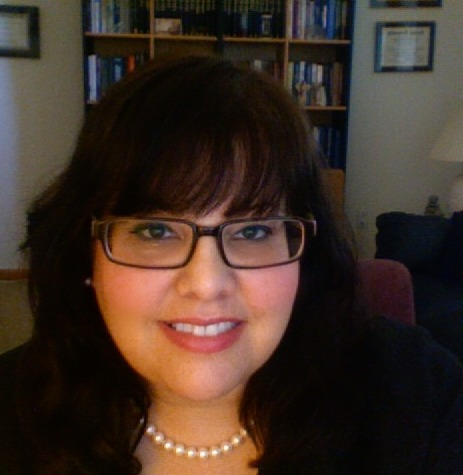
- Born: January 31, 1961 (age 65); New York, US
- Education: Hofstra University
- Occupations: Author, Psychologist
- Website: www.drdeborahserani.com

Deborah Serani (born January 31, 1961) is an American psychologist and an author whose clinical specialty is depression. She is an adjunct professor at Adelphi University. Serani has published academic articles on the subject of depression and trauma as well as the books Living with Depression, Depression and Your Child: A Guide for Parents and Caregivers, and Depression in Later Life: An Essential Guide (Rowman & Littlefield Publishing Group). She is a columnist at Psychology Today and Esperanza Magazine.

== Early life and education ==
Serani obtained a B.A. in psychology from the Hofstra University in 1982, received a Doctorate in Psychology from the Ferkauf Graduate School of Psychology at the Albert Einstein College of Medicine in 1989, and a postdoctoral certificate in psychoanalysis and psychotherapy from the Derner Institute at Adelphi University in 2002.

== Career ==
Serani has spent her career using her personal experiences with depression to inform her clinical work and research. She has been an invited speaker at national and international venues of the American Psychological Association, the National Alliance on Mental Illness and The International Forum on Mood and Anxiety Disorders and TEDx.

== Publications ==
=== Books ===
In her debut book Living with Depression, Serani talks about her lifetime struggles with unipolar depression and suicidal thinking, and how finding the right combination of treatments can lead to health and healing. She comments on the roadblocks of stigma and notes that the pain of depression and most mental illness arises not solely from the illness, but from the harsh response society has to people with these disorders.

== Personal life ==
As a teenager, Serani was treated for depression and cites it as the inspiration for her education and profession.
