= Christopher deCharms =

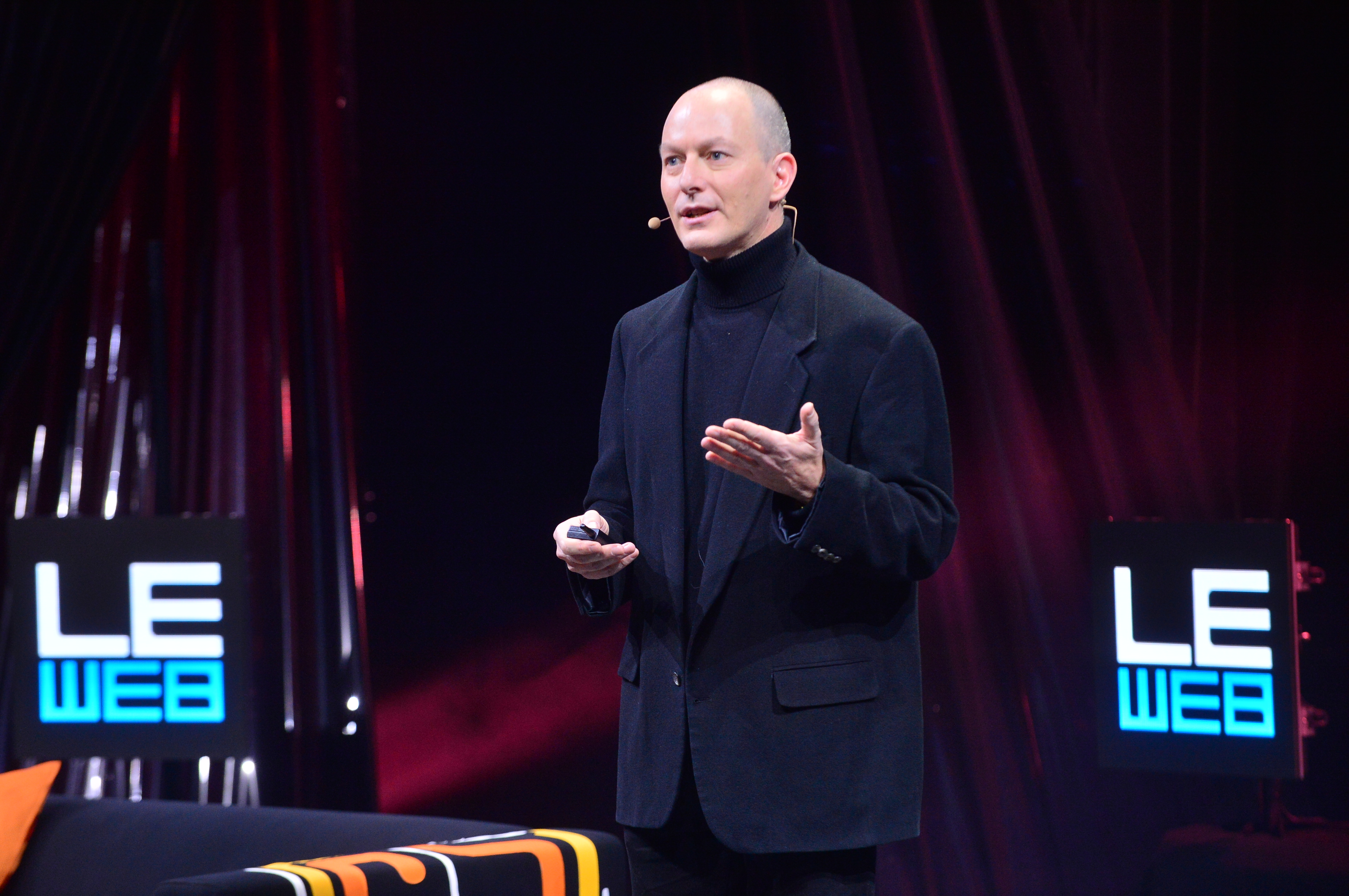

Dr. Christopher deCharms is a neuroscientist, author, and inventor. Currently, deCharms is the founder and CEO of Brainful, a life-sciences companies focused on neurotechnology, including technology based on imaging methods that allow people to watch the activation of their own brains 'live' using functional magnetic resonance imaging (fMRI).

== Augmented Meditation Technology ==
deCharms wrote the book Two Views of Mind, with the 14th Dalai Lama, Tenzin Gyatso. The book included collaborations with a number of meditators and lamas, exploring how the approaches of the two traditions of Western Cognitive Neuroscience and Asian Introspective Meditation can be unified, and whether it is possible to use neuroscience to create new approaches to meditation.

Two Views of Mind attempts to begin building a scientific basis for the effective application of technology to invoke, on-demand, the effects of deep meditation which would allow people to reach mental states previously attainable only by those with many years of focused training. deCharms has since gone on to develop and patent related technologies, described below.

== Neuroscience ==
DeCharms invented and patented the use of brain imaging for someone to visualize the functioning of their own brain in real time using fMRI, creating the new academic field of real-time neuroimaging-based training along with collaborators from around the world. He has developed a set of technologies allowing patients, physicians, researchers, and subjects to visualize and control the functioning of the brain using non-invasive methods based on real-time functional magnetic resonance imaging (rtfMRI). An overview of this field, applications of real-time functional brain imaging, is provided in deCharms' TED talk. DeCharms started his research career in neurophysiology as a graduate student and later postdoctoral researcher in the laboratory of Michael Merzenich at the UCSF Keck Center for Integrative Neuroscience. This work included recording patterns of brain activation from multiple locations in the brain, and how these patterns of activation underlie perception, experience, and learning. This has led to over three dozen published USPTO patent disclosures and multiple issued US patents by Dr. deCharms including foundational patents US-6996261, US-7567693, US-9241665 and others, https://patents.justia.com/patent/20160267809.

== rtfMRI training ==
DeCharms and a team of collaborative researchers have explored whether people can learn to control patterns of activation taking place inside their own brains. It had not previously been possible to non-invasively measure brain activation in real-time using neuroimaging, but recent advances in computation and neuroimaging have made this a reality using rtfMRI.

Subjects' brain activation patterns are measured using real-time fMRI as the subjects watch from inside the scanner using virtual reality goggles, and subjects are trained to control the patterns of activation inside their own brain. This in turn leads to changes in the subjects' mental experiences. For example, subjects have learned to control activation in brain regions associated with pain, and they report a corresponding decrease in their levels of pain. DeCharms' team coined the term Neuroimaging Therapy, in use to describe this approach.

Research on rtfMRI-based training has been published in the scientific literature and has also been broadly covered in the popular press including The New York Times, BBC, NPR, Wired, Technology Review. This research has been conducted at Stanford University and more recently at Omneuron's 3T MRI Research Center in Menlo Park, California through funding from the National Institutes of Health.

== Selected publications ==
- deCharms, R. C.; Maeda, F.; Glover, G. H.; Ludlow, D.; Pauly, J. M.; Soneji, D.; Gabrieli, J. D. & Mackey, S. C. (2005). "Control over brain activation and pain learned by using real-time functional MRI". Proceedings of the National Academy of Sciences USA. 102 (51): 18626–18631. Bibcode:2005PNAS..10218626D. doi:10.1073/pnas.0505210102. PMC 1311906. PMID 16352728.
- deCharms, R. C.; Christoff, K.; Glover, G. H.; Pauly, J. M.; Whitfield, S. & Gabrieli, J. D. (2004). "Learned regulation of spatially localized brain activation using real-time fMRI". NeuroImage. 21 (1): 436–443. doi:10.1016/j.neuroimage.2003.08.041. PMID 14741680. S2CID 15947809.
- Miller, K. L.; Hargreaves, B. A.; Lee, J.; Ress, D.; deCharms, R. C. & Pauly, J. M. (2003). "Functional brain imaging using a blood oxygenation sensitive steady state". Magnetic Resonance in Medicine. 50 (4): 675–683. doi:10.1002/mrm.10602. PMID 14523951. S2CID 14149208.
- deCharms, R. C. & Zador, A. (2000). "Neural representation and the cortical code". Annual Review of Neuroscience. 23: 613–647. doi:10.1146/annurev.neuro.23.1.613. PMID 10845077.
- deCharms, R. C. (1998). "Information coding in the cortex by independent or coordinated populations". Proceedings of the National Academy of Sciences USA. 95 (26): 15166–15168. Bibcode:1998PNAS...9515166D. doi:10.1073/pnas.95.26.15166. PMC 33931. PMID 9860939.
- deCharms, R. C.; Blake, D. T. & Merzenich, M. M. (1998). "Optimizing sound features for cortical neurons". Science. 280 (5368): 1439–1443. Bibcode:1998Sci...280.1439C. doi:10.1126/science.280.5368.1439. PMID 9603734.
- deCharms, R. C.; Merzenich, M. M. (1996). "Primary cortical representation of sounds by the coordination of action-potential timing". Nature. 381 (6583): 610–613. Bibcode:1996Natur.381..610D. doi:10.1038/381610a0. PMID 8637597. S2CID 4258853.
