= Little Albert experiment =

20th-century psychology study

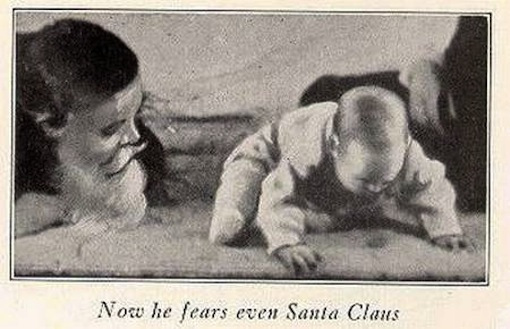
One of a series of published stills taken from film of the experiment

The film of the experiment

The Little Albert experiment was a study in the 1920s, psychologists interpret as evidence of classical conditioning in humans. The study is also claimed to be an example of stimulus generalization although reading the research report demonstrates that fear did not generalize by color or tactile qualities. It was carried out by John B. Watson and his graduate student, Rosalie Rayner, at Johns Hopkins University. The results were first published in the February 1920 issue of the Journal of Experimental Psychology.

After observing children in the field, Watson hypothesized that the fearful response of children to loud noises is an innate unconditioned response. He wanted to test the notion that by following the principles of the procedure now known as "classical conditioning", he could use this unconditioned response to condition a child to fear a distinctive stimulus that normally would not be feared by a child (in this case, furry objects). He wanted to explore wheather a neutral stimulus could evoke fear in a child. However, he admitted in his research article that the fear he generated was neither strong nor lasting.

== Method Q ==
The aim of Watson and Rayner was to condition a phobia in an emotionally stable child. For this study, they chose a nine-month-old infant from a hospital. The child was referred to as "Albert" for the experiment. Watson followed the procedures which Ivan Pavlov had used in his experiments with dogs.

Before the experiment, Albert was given a battery of baseline emotional tests: the infant was exposed, briefly and for the first time, to a white rat, a rabbit, a dog, a monkey, masks (with and without hair), cotton, wool, burning newspapers, and other stimuli. Albert showed no fear of any of these items during the baseline tests.

For the proper experiment, by which point Albert was 9 months old, he was put on a mattress on a table in the middle of a room. A white laboratory rat was placed near Albert and he was allowed to play with it. At this point, Watson and Rayner made a loud sound behind Albert's back by striking a suspended steel bar with a hammer each time the baby touched the rat. Albert responded to the noise by crying and demonstrating fear. After several such pairings of the two stimuli, Albert was presented with only the rat. Upon seeing the rat, Albert became very distressed, crying and crawling away. Apparently, the infant associated the white rat with the noise. The rat, originally a neutral stimulus, had become a conditioned stimulus and was eliciting an emotional (conditional) response similar to the distress (unconditioned response) originally given to the noise (unconditioned stimulus). They learnt that fear could be conditioned.

Two months in every time Albert was shown a white rat and touched it he was exposed to a hammer hitting a steel bar. In further experiments, Little Albert seemed to generalize his response to the white rat. He became distressed at the sight of several other furry objects, such as a rabbit, a furry dog, a fur coat, and even a "mild" reaction to a Santa Claus mask with white cotton balls in the beard. However, this stimulus generalization did not extend to everything with hair.

Watson's experiment had many failings by modern standards. For example, the data only had one participant and wasn't repeated and no control subjects. Furthermore, such an experiment could be hard to conduct in compliance with current laws and regulations, given the expected risks to the subject.

== Subsequent events ==
Albert was about one year old at the end of the experiment, and he reportedly left the hospital shortly thereafter. Though Watson had discussed what might be done to remove Albert's conditioned fears, Albert's mother, who had not been fully informed of the nature of the experiment, withdrew her son from the study before any reversal could take place, and it is thought likely that the infant's fear of furry things continued post experimentally.

Watson later gave a series of weekend lectures describing the Little Albert study. One of these lectures was attended by Mary Cover Jones, which sparked her interest in pursuing graduate work in psychology. Jones conducted an experiment to figure out how to eliminate fear responses in children and studied a boy named Peter, who was two years old. Peter shared similar fears of white rabbits and furry objects as Little Albert. Jones was able to increase Peter's tolerance of white rabbits by exposing him to the animal at gradually shorter distances and having Peter interact with children who were not afraid of the rabbit. Watson is listed in the publication of the study as advisor and editor. Mary Cover Jones was the first psychologist to desensitize, or decondition, a fear response and become known as the "Mother of Behaviour Therapy".

== Identifying Little Albert ==
According to some textbooks, Albert's mother worked in the same building as Watson and did not know the tests were being conducted. When she found out, she took Albert and moved away, letting no one know where they were going. A 2009 report, however, disputes that. The original report had stated that the baby's mother was a wet nurse at the hospital, who may have felt coerced and unable to turn down a request for her baby to be used in Watson's experiment. The claim of coercion was challenged in an article published in the same journal as the coercion claim.

=== Douglas Merritte ===
In 2009, psychologists Hall P. Beck and Sharman Levinson published an article in which they claimed to have discovered the true identity of "Albert B." After reviewing Watson's correspondence and publications, as well as research in public documents (such as the 1920 United States census and state birth and death records), Beck argued that "Albert B." was a pseudonym for Douglas Merritte, the son of Arvilla Merritte, then a woman who appears to have been a wet nurse at the Harriet Lane Home.

It was later found that Douglas Merritte had hydrocephalus, from which he died at the age of 6. With this condition, which is an accumulation of cerebrospinal fluid on the brain, Merritte may have had severe trouble seeing at the time of the experiment, and this disputes the claim that the child in question was average and healthy. According to researchers who looked at this case years later, if Douglas Merritte was, indeed, Little Albert, his actions during the conditioning sessions align with signs of neurological impairment. This includes Little Albert's use of hand-scooping, rather than grasping gestures typical of this age, as well as poor eye-scanning abilities and his lack of facial expressions. Other research has argued, however, that Douglas Merritte may not have been "Little Albert", who may, in fact, have been young Albert Barger (known later as William Albert Martin).

=== Albert Barger ===
The identity claimed by Beck, et al., has been contested by psychology researchers Russ Powell, Nancy Digdon and Ben Harris, who offer an alternative identity based on available data. Albert Barger had been born within a day of Merritte, and his mother had also worked at the hospital where the experiment was conducted. In addition, his body weight and developmental condition closely matched the experiment's documentation of the subject baby's condition. Moreover, according to Watson and Rayner (1920), Little Albert was 12 months and 21 days the last day of the experiment when "he was taken from the hospital" (p. 12), the exact age Albert Barger had been when he left the hospital. Finally, when Powell et al. were allowed to independently verify Douglas Merritte's clinical file, it was revealed that he was "completely blind", which is at odds with the experiment's films where Little Albert engages in probable instances of object-directed action and social referencing.

Through the use of a professional genealogist, the researchers learned Barger had died in 2007 at age 87 and identified one close living relative, a niece. In an interview, Barger's niece stated that she and her uncle had been quite close throughout his life, and acknowledged Barger's antipathy toward dogs as a well-known fact that family members, particularly his wife, would tease him about (the researchers noted there was no way to determine whether or not this behavior was linked to Watson's experiment). She also informed researchers of her uncle's aversion to animals in general, not just dogs. Though it was not a particularly strong aversion, family members would often have to keep their dogs in a separate room when he visited. Outside of this, Barger's niece stated that she did not recall any other phobias he may have had. The researchers concluded that Barger would have been unaware of his role as an infant test subject.

== Ethical considerations ==
The experiment today would be considered unethical according to the American Psychological Association's ethic code, and legislation has been passed to prevent such potentially harmful experiments. In the early 1970s, following widely publicized cases of research abuse, the National Commission for the Protection of Human Subjects of Biomedical and Behavioral Research (NCPHS) was created to study issues surrounding the protection of humans in research. In 1979, the Commission issued a report entitled Ethical Principles and Guidelines for the Protection of Human Subjects of Research (commonly called the Belmont Report), which provided the ethical framework on which current federal regulations for the protection of human participants in research are based. Under the NCPHS standards set in the late 1970s, an experiment such as Watson's would not have been allowed. Research with participants is also regulated by the Health Insurance Portability and Accountability Act of 1996 and the Public Health Service Act. In addition, training of researchers in the use of human participants has been required by the National Institutes of Health since 2000.

== Criticisms ==
A detailed review of the original study and its subsequent interpretations by Ben Harris (1979) stated:

Critical reading of Watson and Rayner's (1920) report reveals little evidence either that Albert developed a rat phobia or even that animals consistently evoked his fear (or anxiety) during Watson and Rayner's experiment. It may be useful for modern learning theorists to see how the Albert study prompted subsequent research ... but it seems time, finally, to place the Watson and Rayner data in the category of "interesting but uninterpretable" results.

It is difficult to be certain exactly what happened during the Little Albert experiment since concrete evidence and scientific records are lacking. Though a film was shot during the experiment, textbooks interpret the movie differently. Various sources give contradicting accounts of events that took place and they raise questions about exactly what stimuli were used, which stimuli the baby came to fear, and what happened to the child after the experiment. It was said that most textbooks "suffer from inaccuracies of various degrees" while referring to Watson and Rayner's study. Texts often misrepresent, exaggerate, or minimize the range of Albert's post-conditioning fears.

Other criticisms concern the health of the child. It has been alleged that his name was Douglas Merritte and that he was not a "healthy", "normal" infant as claimed in the study, but one who was very ill and had exhibited symptoms of hydrocephalus since birth—according to relatives he never learned to walk or talk later in life. The child would purportedly die five years after the experiment due to complications from the congenital disease. It is stated that the study's authors were aware of the child's severe cognitive deficit, abnormal behavior, and unusually frequent crying, but continued to terrify the sick infant and generalize their findings to healthy infants, an act criticized as academic fraud. These accusations were rejected by other articles in the same journals that published the initial claims. The authors rejecting the "sick baby" claim stated that the child was actually William (called Albert by his family) Barger, and that the child was, in fact, healthy.

The study also faced criticism for its limited methodology and was very restricted the researchers also had a small sample size as they used one subject and wasn't replicated. Critics also say ' little fear or no fear conditioning actually occurred". Watson also knowingly experimented on a neurologically impaired child which doesn't make the research reliable and easy to repeat.
