= Aron K. Barbey =

American cognitive neuroscientist

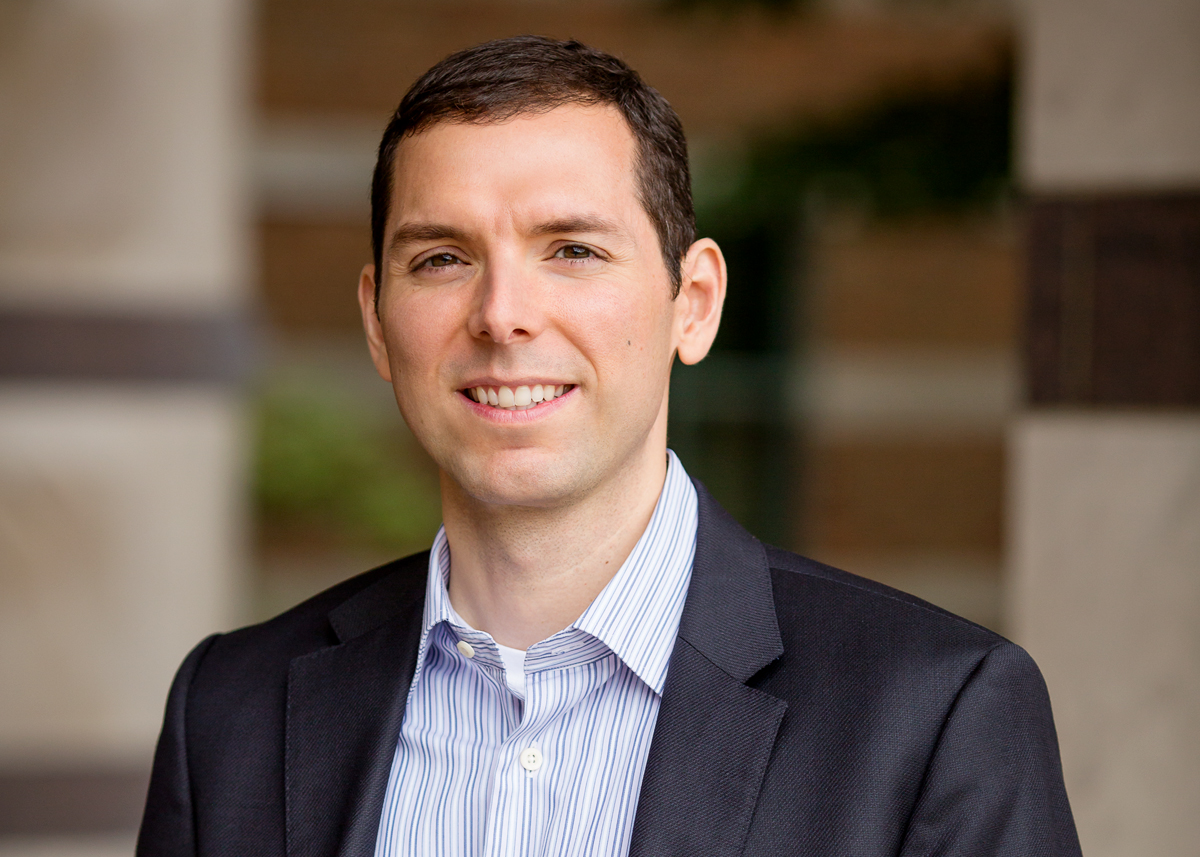
- Beckman Institute, 2014
- Born: 1977 (age 48–49)
- Education: Emory University National Institute of Neurological Disorders and Stroke
- Known for: Network Neuroscience Theory
- Scientific career
- Fields: Cognitive neuroscience Cognitive neuropsychology
- Workplaces: Beckman Institute for Advanced Science and Technology Carl R. Woese Institute for Genomic Biology

Aron Keith Barbey (born January 6, 1977) is an American cognitive neuroscientist, who investigates the neural architecture of human intelligence and brain plasticity. Barbey is the Emanuel Donchin Professorial Scholar of Psychology and a Professor of Psychology, Neuroscience, and Bioengineering at the University of Illinois. He is director of the Decision Neuroscience Laboratory at the Beckman Institute for Advanced Science and Technology, and founding director of the Center for Brain Plasticity at the Beckman Institute, where he leads the Intelligence, Learning, and Plasticity (ILP) Initiative.

He has used both classical lesion methods and functional magnetic resonance imaging (fMRI) techniques to better understand neural architecture and its relationship to intelligence. Barbey used lesion mapping to study Vietnam veterans who had suffered brain trauma. He was able to record diagnostic images of their brains and relate this anatomical data to their documented problems, creating a "brain atlas" linking cognitive functions to neural organization. He has suggested a framework called "structured event complex theory" that describes the inferential architecture of the prefrontal cortex.

His research group examines the effects of physical fitness, nutrition and cognitive neuroscience interventions (including TDCS) on brain health and intelligence across the human lifespan. In 2019, Barbey was awarded the Mensa Foundation Prize for his neuroscientific work studying human intelligence.

== Education and career ==
Aron Barbey received a B.A. from the University of Texas at Dallas in 1999, and a Ph.D. in Psychology from Emory University, Atlanta, Georgia, in 2007.

From 2007-2011 Barbey was a Postdoctoral Fellow in the Cognitive Neuroscience Section of the National Institute of Neurological Disorders and Stroke at the National Institutes of Health, Bethesda, Maryland. There he studied Vietnam veterans affected by brain trauma. They experienced differential deficits depending on the locations and size of their injuries. Barbey also served as an adjunct professor of psychology at Georgetown University, Washington, D.C., beginning in 2008.

In 2011 Barbey was appointed to the College of Applied Health Sciences at the University of Illinois, and became an Institute Affiliate of the Beckman Institute for Advanced Science and Technology. By 2012, he was the director of the Decision Neuroscience Laboratory at the Beckman Institute. In 2018, the Center for Brain Plasticity at the Beckman Institute was formed, under the leadership of co-directors Aron Barbey and Neal J. Cohen, leaders of the center's Intelligence, Learning, and Plasticity (ILP) Initiative.

== Professional activities ==
Aron Barbey is Associate Editor of Frontiers in Human Neuroscience. Barbey is also on the Editorial Boards of NeuroImage, Intelligence, and Thinking & Reasoning. He is a co-editor of the Cambridge Handbook of Intelligence and Cognitive Neuroscience (2021).

== Research ==
External media

Audio
- Dr. Aron Barbey, University of Illinois at Urbana-Champaign – Emotional Intelligence, The Academic Minute, April 27, 2013, WAMC Northeast Public Radio

Video
- "Brain Injury, Intelligence & Impairment @ University of Illinois", TheScienceCoalition, July 16, 2012

=== Cognitive neuroscience of human intelligence ===
Barbey's research investigates the effects of human brain damage on intellectual and social functions, with particular emphasis on the prefrontal cortex.

Studies of patients with frontal lobe damage have a long history in the neuroscience of intelligence and provide a direct way to test whether regions in the prefrontal cortex are necessary for specific intellectual abilities. However, it was only recently that the limited applicability and specificity of small sample studies of focal brain damage were overcome by contemporary lesion mapping approaches.

In a series of studies, Barbey's research group investigated almost 200 patients with focal brain injuries and mapped the architecture of executive, social, and emotional brain systems. His research has helped to identify and characterize the neural systems underlying general intelligence, emotional intelligence, social intelligence, fluid intelligence, working memory, cognitive flexibility, and discourse comprehension.

Barbey's research has also revealed molecular genetic markers that predict general intelligence following traumatic brain injury.

=== Cognitive neuroscience methods to enhance human intelligence ===
A central goal of Barbey's research is to establish and validate cognitive neuroscience-directed interventions to enhance human intelligence. Barbey is the Principal Investigator of the IARPA-sponsored INSIGHT project, along with co-investigators Arthur F. Kramer, Neal J. Cohen, and Charles H. Hillman.

=== Network neuroscience theory of human intelligence ===
Barbey has proposed a network neuroscience theory of human intelligence that emphasizes brain plasticity, in which "general intelligence reflects individual differences in the efficiency and flexibility of brain networks" and "the capacity to integrate information across the brain as a whole". According to this view, "crystallized intelligence" involves the ability to rapidly access existing representations of knowledge and experience while "fluid intelligence" involves the ability to solve novel problems in ways that are adaptive and flexible.

=== Funding ===
Barbey's Decision Neuroscience Laboratory is supported by large-scale private and federal research grants and contracts, including the Air Force Research Laboratory (AFRL), President Obama's White House BRAIN Initiative, the Director of National Intelligence's research agency, IARPA, and contracts for $10 million from Defense Advanced Research Projects Agency (DARPA) for the study of individual optimization of human performance in the U.S. military using artificial intelligence.

== Selected books ==
- Barbey, Aron K.; Karama, Sherif; Haier, Richard J., eds. (Jan 31, 2021). Cambridge Handbook of Intelligence and Cognitive Neuroscience. Cambridge University Press. ISBN 978-1-108-72772-3.
- Barbey, Aron K.; Johnson, Elizabeth J.; Dauncey, Margaret Joy, eds. (January 23, 2019). Nutritional Cognitive Neuroscience Research at the Crossroads of Nutrition, Psychology, and Neuroscience. Frontiers Media SA.

== Selected papers ==
- Barbey, Aron K.; Colom, Roberto; Solomon, Jeffrey; Krueger, Frank; Forbes, Chad; Grafman, Jordan (2012). "An integrative architecture for general intelligence and executive function revealed by lesion mapping". Brain. 135 (4): 1154–1164. doi:10.1093/brain/aws021. PMC 3326251. PMID 22396393.
- Barbey, Aron K.; Colom, Roberto; Grafman, Jordan (Mar 2014). "Distributed neural system for emotional intelligence revealed by lesion mapping". Social Cognitive and Affective Neuroscience. 9 (3): 265–272. doi:10.1093/scan/nss124. PMC 3980800. PMID 23171618.
- Barbey, A. K.; Colom, R.; Paul, E. J.; Chau, A.; Solomon, J.; Grafman, J. H. (2014). "Lesion mapping of social problem solving". Brain. 137 (Pt 10): 2823–2833. doi:10.1093/brain/awu207. PMC 4163035. PMID 25070511.
- Barbey, Aron K.; Colom, Roberto; Paul, Erick J.; Grafman, Jordan (2014). "Architecture of fluid intelligence and working memory revealed by lesion mapping". Brain Structure and Function. 219 (2): 485–494. doi:10.1007/s00429-013-0512-z. PMID 23392844. S2CID 17485196.
- Barbey, Aron K.; Koenigs, Michael; Grafman, Jordan (May 2013). "Dorsolateral prefrontal contributions to human working memory". Cortex. 49 (5): 1195–1205. doi:10.1016/j.cortex.2012.05.022. PMC 3495093. PMID 22789779.
- Koenigs, M.; Barbey, A. K.; Postle, B. R.; Grafman, J. (25 November 2009). "Superior Parietal Cortex Is Critical for the Manipulation of Information in Working Memory". Journal of Neuroscience. 29 (47): 14980–14986. doi:10.1523/JNEUROSCI.3706-09.2009. PMC 2799248. PMID 19940193.
- Barbey, Aron K.; Colom, Roberto; Grafman, Jordan (2013). "Architecture of cognitive flexibility revealed by lesion mapping". NeuroImage. 82: 547–554. doi:10.1016/j.neuroimage.2013.05.087. PMC 3790579. PMID 23721727.
- Barbey, Aron K.; Colom, Roberto; Grafman, Jordan (2014). "Neural mechanisms of discourse comprehension: a human lesion study". Brain. 137 (1): 277–287. doi:10.1093/brain/awt312. PMC 3954106. PMID 24293267.
- Barbey, Aron K.; Colom, Roberto; Paul, Erick; Forbes, Chad; Krueger, Frank; Goldman, David; Grafman, Jordan; Zhou, Renping (2014). "Preservation of General Intelligence following Traumatic Brain Injury: Contributions of the Met66 Brain-Derived Neurotrophic Factor". PLOS ONE. 9 (2) e88733. Bibcode:2014PLoSO...988733B. doi:10.1371/journal.pone.0088733. PMC 3935849. PMID 24586380.
- Barbey, Aron K. (January 2018). "Network Neuroscience Theory of Human Intelligence". Trends in Cognitive Sciences. 22 (1): 8–20. doi:10.1016/j.tics.2017.10.001. PMID 29167088.
