= Mary Cover Jones =

American developmental psychologist

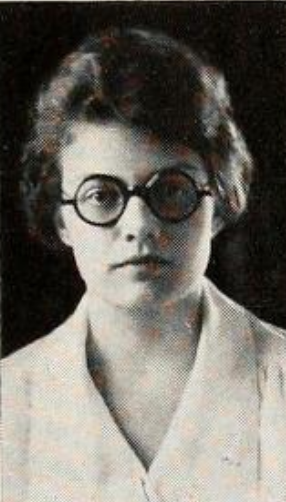
- Mary Cover (later Jones), from the 1919 yearbook of Vassar College
- Born: September 1, 1897; Johnstown, Pennsylvania, US
- Died: July 22, 1987 (aged 89); Santa Barbara, California, US
- Education: Columbia University (PhD); Columbia University (MA); Vassar College (AB)
- Occupation: American developmental psychologist
- Known for: Desensitization
- Spouse: Harold Jones (married 1920)
- Children: 2

Mary Cover Jones (September 1, 1897 – July 22, 1987) was an American developmental psychologist and a pioneer of behavior therapy, despite the field being heavily dominated by males throughout much of the 20th century. Joseph Wolpe dubbed her "the mother of behavior therapy" due to her famous study of Peter and development of desensitization.

== Early life and education ==
Cover Jones was the middle child of three born to Carrie Louise Higson and Charles Blair Cover. She had a brother who was five years older than her and a sister who was four years younger than her. Jones' mother was a homemaker involved in several local community organizations while her father was a businessman. Due to regretting not attending post-secondary education himself, Cover encouraged his children to attend university. Visiting Chautauqua Institute on Lake Erie, Ohio became a yearly summer trip for the Cover family during Cover Jones' childhood.

After being accepted into Vassar College, Cover Jones chose to study psychology. She took every psychology course offered at Vassar College except one that was offered by Margaret Floy Washburn. Washburn refused to admit her into the class because of a poor laboratory grade in a previous class. She spent her summer vacations, during her time in college, working with poor children in summer camps and settlement houses. Soon after graduating from Vassar College, in 1919, Cover Jones attended a lecture by the noted behaviorist John B. Watson, in New York City. After hearing Watson's lecture, Mary wondered if conditioning could be used to eliminate fears. In 1919, she began her graduate work at Columbia University, and completed her master's degree in 1920 and her doctoral degree in 1926. Mary Cover married a fellow graduate student, Harold E. Jones, in 1920, and in 1927, they moved to the University of California at Berkeley and its Institute of Human Development, then known as the Institute of Child Welfare.

== Career ==
In 1923, Cover Jones became an associate professor of Psychological Research at the Institute of Educational Research, Teachers' College, Columbia University. Cover Jones conducted her famous study of Peter during her position as associate at Columbia University. After publishing the result from the Peter study in 1924, she completed a doctoral dissertation on the development of early behavior patterns in young children. She went on to work with 365 infants in various areas in New York City and studied the development of early behavior of young children. Jones did not receive attention for her work until the 1960s, when the field of behavior therapy began to coalesce under the leadership of Joseph Wolpe.

In the summer of 1927, Cover Jones, her husband, and their two daughters moved to California. Barbara, her first daughter, was born in 1922. Lesley, her second daughter, was born three years later in 1925. She then accepted a position as research associate at the Institute for Child Welfare at Berkeley where she became involved in the longitudinal Oakland Growth Study (OGS). A position as Director of Research was offered to Harold, while Cover Jones accepted a position as research associate at the Institute for Child Welfare at the University of California, Berkeley in 1952.

In 1952, Cover Jones became Assistant Professor of Education at Berkeley. Although she had relevant experience and conducted research, she was not allowed to become a full-time professor due to her husband also being employed at the university. This anti-nepotism rule was very common in this era. The University of California, Berkeley eventually set aside that rule and in 1959 Cover Jones became full professor for one year. During this time, she and her husband Harold produced the first educational television course on developmental psychology.

In 1960, she became president of the Division of Developmental Psychology of the American Psychological Association (APA). In the same year, she and Harold retired, shortly after which he died of a heart attack.

In 1986, Jones received the G. Stanley Hall Award from the APA. The G. Stanley Hall Award is awarded to recognize notable contributions to developmental psychology. Some of Jones' contributions include her study of Peter, which laid the foundation for behavior therapy, and her development of desensitization and direct conditioning to overcome fears. Unrelated to psychological research, Cover Jones spent her time being involved in committees related to child welfare and spent a great deal of time and effort on such causes.

== Psychological research ==
=== "Little Peter" experiments ===
While attending a speech by leading behavioral psychologist, John B. Watson, Cover Jones became interested in his most famous study, the "Little Albert experiment". In this experiment, an infant was classically conditioned to express a fearful response when a white rat was presented along with a loud noise that shocked the child. Cover Jones began to wonder if the techniques used by Watson could be used to make children less fearful of a stimulus, in essence reversing his findings.

These thoughts led to her most cited work, a study of the removal of a fear of rabbits through conditioning conducted on a three-year-old named Peter at Columbia University. She treated Peter's fear of a white rabbit by "direct conditioning", in which a pleasant stimulus (food) was associated with the rabbit. Cover Jones began her experiment with the goal of finding the most effective way to eliminate irrational fears in children. Peter was chosen for the study because in all other aspects of infant life he was considered to be normal except for his fear of rabbits. Peter was not only afraid of rabbits; Cover Jones showed he would also cry when presented with other similar items such as feathers, a fur coat, a fur rug and cotton. She conducted her experiments using a range of different treatments in order to eliminate the fear response in Peter. She described her methods used in the Peter study as "patient, meticulous and painstaking procedures", in order to understand what was taking place. This is a method that she learned from her mentor Watson.

She initiated the study with the rabbit being 12 feet from Peter, and brought the rabbit closer until it was nibbling on Peter's fingers. As the rabbit was gradually brought closer to Peter with the presence of his favorite food (candy), his fear subsided and he eventually was able to touch the rabbit without crying. After curing Peter of his phobia, Cover Jones wrote and published a paper about the experiment titled "A Laboratory Study of Fear: The Case of Peter (1924)". Though now considered to be a revolutionary experiment, at the time it was largely dismissed and was not even written up as Cover Jones's dissertation.

This study by Cover Jones is considered by some to be a defining landmark in behavioral therapy and was a breakthrough in how behaviorism could be studied and manipulated in the laboratory. Due to the rediscovery of this research in the 1970s, Cover Jones was considered "the mother of behavioral therapy" by her friend Wolpe and other colleagues. Additionally, this study was important for the development of the idea and technique of desensitization, now often used to cure phobias by repeatedly exposing a person with a phobia to a series of stimuli that approximate the feared object.

=== Oakland growth study ===
The Oakland growth study is one of Cover Jones's most influential studies. The Oakland growth study was the third in a series of longitudinal studies from Berkeley College. The first study in the trio was the Berkeley Growth Study, looking at newborns (1928), followed by the Berkeley Guidance study, looking at preschool age children (1928). Both studies were done by looking at children living in Berkeley, California. The Oakland Growth Study (OGS) was led by Cover Jones and her husband. The study began in 1932 in Oakland, California. The Study followed 212 students in the fifth and sixth grade who were born between the years 1920–1921. The participants were studied twice a year until they graduated from high school. The study's primary goal was to understand typical adolescence. They looked at physical abilities, physiological changes, and peer relationships. They were then studied in adulthood at ages 38, 48, and 60 years old. The studies in adulthood consisted of interviews, questionnaires, personality inventories, and health assessments. The final interview of participants took place in 1980, when Cover Jones was 83 years old.

The results from the Oakland Growth Study allowed Cover Jones to publish 100 papers. Also, due to the well documented data from this study, the data has been reanalyzed and used for other research in the field of child development. The success of the study is considered to be partly due to Cover Jones's strong commitment to the research and her ability to maintain friendships with the study's participants.

An important finding from the Oakland Growth Study was the long term emotional and behavioral effects of boys and girls who went through puberty at a younger age or at an older age. Additional findings of the Oakland Growth Study were the developmental effects of drinking in adolescents and the effects of economic status.

=== Research with late- and early- maturing boys ===
Within the field of child development, Jones believed there was some evidence that supported the idea that adolescent children who have started maturing (reaching puberty) at an earlier age were perceived and treated differently by their peers and other adults. In Child Development, the flagship journal of the society of Research and Child Development, published an articles were published by Paul Mussen and Mary Cover Jones (1957, 1958) and that investigated the relationship between physical maturation status and self-concepts in late- and early-maturating adolescent boys and girls, respectively.

Paul Mussen and Mary Cover Jones (1957) conducted a study that investigated the relationship between maturational status and certain aspects of personality during late adolescence. Mussen and Jones believed that there is evidence that supports the notion that within our culture, adults treat boys who have started puberty at an earlier age differently from boys who have started puberty at a later age because of their physical status. The current study used multiple personality inventories that aimed to uncover aspects of late – and early- maturing boys’ personality to see if there was significant differences among the boys.

One personality inventory included images of people and objects, and the researchers showed each individual boy, one by one, an image and asked the boy to create a story about what is happening in the image, in hopes that the child would uncover something about himself through the images seen. The results of the study showed that later maturing boys are more likely than early maturing boys to encounter an “unfavorable socio-psychological environment” and that, in turn, can have lifelong implications.

=== Research with late- and early- maturing girls ===
The following year, Paul Mussen and Mary Cover Jones (1958) replicated the study using late and early maturing adolescent girls. The researchers had different hypotheses for the girls than the boys. The advantageous socio-psychological environments that boys were exposed to for maturing earlier were different for early maturing girls. In our culture, early maturing girls are perceived by adults more negatively than later maturing girls.

The current study tested the same methods and procedures for the girls as they tested for the boys and the results indicated that early-maturing girls were socially disadvantaged until the late-maturing girls “caught up” (reached the similar physical status to early maturing girls), which at that point, they no longer perceived any differences.

== Death ==
Cover Jones died in Santa Barbara, California on July 22, 1987. She left behind her two daughters—Lesley Alexander, who lived in Santa Barbara and died on May 27, 2020, and Barbara Coates, who currently lives in Claremont, California—and her six grandchildren. Minutes before she died, Cover Jones told her sister: "I am still learning about what is important in life".
