= Felicitas Heyne =

German psychologist and book author

Felicitas Heyne is a German psychologist and book author. She is also the developer of the iPersonic system for personal development, which is available in 26 languages.

== Life ==
She was born in 1966 in Heidelberg. She worked at first for some years in economics before she studied psychology at the University of Koblenz-Landau. She lives and works in Annweiler am Trifels.

== Bibliography ==
Felicitas Heyne is the author of several books about personality, happiness and relationships.

- "Fremdenverkehr. Warum wir so viel über Sex reden und trotzdem keinen mehr haben." (2012) ISBN 9783442172986
- "Online zur Traumfrau" (2012) ISBN 9783280054451
- "Glücksfitness. Das individuelle Training für mehr Lebensfreude" (2012) ISBN 9783451063558
- "In 90 Tagen zum Traummann" (2010) ISBN 9783280053935
- "Hassgeliebte Schwiegermutter" (2008) ISBN 9783636063991

== Sources ==
- Personal data and list of publications at the German National Library, (in German).
