= Ernest Mahone =

American pediatric neuropsychologist

Ernest "Mark" Mahone (born September 19, 1961) is an American pediatric neuropsychologist.

== Biography ==
Mahone was born September 19, 1961 to Leonard Ray Mahone Jr. and Jacqueline Joan Healthcote.

Mahone married Sue Ellen Gould, on March 27, 1986; together they have two children, Andrew Mark Mahone and Evan Lori Mahone.

Mahone received a Bachelor of Science in elementary education from the University of Maryland in 1983 and a master's degree in 1985. While studying for his Ph.D. in counseling psychology at the State University of New York at Albany, he worked as a clinical psychology intern with the National Naval Medical Center from 1989 to 1990. After earning his degree in 1990, he began a post-doctoral fellowship in a clinical neuropsychology at Boston Children's Hospital, Harvard Medical School Department of Psychiatry.

He is board certified in clinical neuropsychology and is a licensed psychologist in the state of Maryland.

He is an editorial board member for Child Neuropsychology Assessment, Developmental Neuropsychology, Archives of Clinical Neuropsychology, Journal of the International Neuropsychological Society, and Clinical Neuropsychologist.

== Research ==
Mahone's research focuses on Attention deficit hyperactivity disorder (ADHD), movement disorders, learning disabilities, spina bifida, childhood cancer, prenatal alcohol exposure, and sleep disorders; his primary research focus is on children with ADHD. He is currently conducting research studies at the Kennedy Krieger Institute on typically developing boys ages 9–14, children ages 4–5 with and without ADHD, children ages 5–9 with and without ADHD, and parents of children who have been diagnosed with ADHD. Mahone recently received a grant to study the development of ADHD in preschool children.

=== ADHD ===
==== School age ====
In his article, "The Effects of ADHD (Beyond Decoding Accuracy) on Reading Fluency and Comprehension", Mahone outlines the ways that ADHD can impair school-age children academically. Multitasking, reading comprehension, processing speed, motor skills, and working memory tend to work normally in children without ADHD; however, those with ADHD experience deficits in all of these areas. Children with ADHD have a hard time multitasking, which in an academic setting means that they have difficulty listening to their teacher and taking notes simultaneously. Mahone suggests that teachers let ADHD students either record lessons or provide them with outlines of lessons in order to aid their understanding of the material. Reading and reading comprehension are the academic areas that ADHD children tend to have the most trouble with. Mahone believes that it is working memory deficits that inhibit ADHD students from fully comprehending the main points of reading material; children with ADHD tend to get distracted by smaller, less relevant details, which results in their inability to fully comprehend what they read as a whole. Students with ADHD also have trouble processing information as fast as those without ADHD, which results in slower reading and writing pace; since children with ADHD can become distracted during long assignments they are slower at processing the information. Because of time pressure, tests are especially difficult for children with ADHD, and they are more likely to experience fatigue as a result of their slow processing speed and deficient motor skills.

Mahone's research indicates that children with ADHD function somewhat normally until third grade, because up until then, tasks and assignments are simple and do not require a lot of mental processing. In fourth grade, students undergo a change where they are no longer learning to read, but reading to learn. In this stage, students must understand and find meaning in what they are reading in order to complete tasks and assignments. Mahone believes this shift in mental processing explains why children with ADHD do not start to struggle in school until around third or fourth grade. This evidence supports his claim that neuropsychological assessments of children suspected to have ADHD are necessary, despite the fact that they are costly and time-consuming. In his article, "The Role of Neuropsychological Assessment in the Functional Outcomes of Children with ADHD", Mahone finds that pediatricians and primary care physicians rarely adhere to the ADHD diagnostic guidelines. ADHD often co-exists with other disorders, and without diagnoses supplemented by neuropsychological assessment, comorbid disorders may be overlooked; this can be costlier for a child and their family in the long run. Additionally, Mahone finds that untreated children with ADHD or other comorbidities are at a greater risk for poorer outcomes in social, academic, vocational, and practical settings than children without ADHD.

==== Preschool ====
By turning his attention to ADHD in preschoolers, Mahone aims to prevent the fourth-grade failures that many untreated students with ADHD may experience. Through his research on preschool children, he hopes to understand more about brain development in children with ADHD, as wells as earlier identification and ways to treat disorder. In his studies, Mahone has found that the caudate nucleus is significantly smaller in preschool children with symptoms of ADHD, which may predict the severity of the disorder later in life (the caudate nucleus is essential to the development of attention and cognitive control). He finds that the cerebral cortex of preschoolers with ADHD is normal compared to that of preschoolers without ADHD, which is an important finding since older children with ADHD have been found to have a smaller cerebral cortex. This indicates that the cerebral cortex develops later than sub-cortical structures, like the caudate nucleus, which may indicate that a small caudate nucleus can influence and inhibit the growth of the cerebral cortex. Mahone hopes to pinpoint abnormalities in the caudate nucleus of children with ADHD in an attempt to find a treatment that will promote normal development of the cerebral cortex; if treatment can help the cerebral cortex function and develop normally, higher cognitive functions may not be impaired in children with ADHD, which will allow them to function more normally than if the treatment had not been administered.
