= Dennis Reina =

Dennis Reina (born 15 June 1950) is a psychologist and co-author of two books on building and rebuilding trust in the workplace. They include Trust and Betrayal in the Workplace: Building Effective Relationships in Your Organization, and the sequel, Rebuilding Trust in the Workplace: Seven Steps to Renew Confidence, Commitment, and Energy. Along with his wife, he is considered a pioneer and expert in the idea of building business trust to improve trust in workplace organizations. He is co-founder of the Reina Trust Building Institute, a consultancy that specializes in developing and restoring workplace trust. His work has been published in peer-reviewed journals, including the American Journal of Critical Care. His work has also featured in mainstream media publications, including The New York Times, USA Today, Atlanta Journal-Constitution, CNBC, and CNN.

== Education ==
Reina earned a BS in business administration and marketing from the University of Maryland (1972), an MA in holistic health education from Beacon College (1983), an MA in organizational development from Fielding Graduate University (1992), and a PhD in human and organizational systems from Fielding Graduate University (1995).

== Professional history ==
Reina was the director of supervisory and managerial training for the State of Vermont from 1986 to 1992. He worked as the assistant director of admissions for Goddard College from 1984 to 1986.

Reina co-authored two books with his wife, Dr. Michelle L. Reina: Trust and Betrayal in the Workplace: Building Effective Relationships in Your Organization, and the sequel, Rebuilding Trust in the Workplace: Seven Steps to Renew Confidence, Commitment, and Energy. Both have been published in multiple languages. The books have been featured in Bloomberg Businessweek, The New York Times, The Wall Street Journal, Time, and USA Today as well as on TV and radio networks, including CNBC and CNN.

Reina is currently president of the Reina Trust Building Institute, an organizational development research and consulting firm. He co-founded the Reina Trust Building Institute with his wife, Dr. Michelle L. Reina, in 1992. The institute is a consultancy that specializes developing and restoring workplace trust. Some of the institute's clients are: American Express, Ben & Jerry's, Case Western University, Harvard University, Johnson & Johnson, Lincoln Financial, MillerCoors, Nokia, Sandia National Labs, Toyota, Turner Broadcasting (CNN), U.S. Treasury Department and Walt Disney World.

Reina was a member of the National Speakers Association from 2000 – 2010.

== Honors and awards ==
- (2005) US Army Chief of Chaplains Award - Senior Leadership Training
- (2007) Nautilus Silver Book Award Winner - Working Relationships (for Trust and Betrayal in the Workplace, 2nd edition.)
- (2008) Axiom Bronze Business Book Award – Communication Skills/Networking (for Trust and Betrayal in the Workplace, 2nd edition.)
- (2010) Top 100 Thought Leaders in America - Trust Across America
- (2011) Axiom Silver Business Book Award - Business Ethics (for Rebuilding Trust in the Workplace)
- World HRD Congress Global Strategic Leadership Award

== Bibliography ==
- Trust and Betrayal in the Workplace: Building Effective Relationships in Your Organization, 1st edition, co-authored with Michelle L. Reina (1999) (Berrett-Koehler)
- Trust and Betrayal in the Workplace: Building Effective Relationships in Your Organization, revised and expanded, 2nd edition, co-authored with Michelle L. Reina (2006) (ISBN 9781576753774)
- "Trust Building Online: Virtual Collaboration and the Development of Trust" in: The Handbook of High-Performance Virtual Teams: A Toolkit for Collaborating Across Boundaries. Co-authored with Chris Francovich, Michelle Reina, and Christopher Dilts (2008) (ISBN 978-0-470-17642-9)
- "Rebuilding Trust within Organizations" in: Building High-Performance People and Organizations, Vol. 2 – The Engaged Workplace: Organizational Strategies. Co-authored with Michelle L. Reina (2008) (ISBN 978-0-275-99273-6)
- "Develop Leadership Trust to Navigate Change and Uncertainty" in: The 2010 Pfeiffer Annual Leadership Development. Co-authored with Michelle L. Reina (2010) (ISBN 978-0-470-49902-3)
- Rebuilding Trust in the Workplace: Seven Steps to Renew Confidence, Commitment, and Energy, co-authored with Michelle L. Reina (2010) (ISBN 978-1-60509-372-7)
