= Germaine Guex =

Swiss psychologist and psychoanalyst (1904-1984)

Germaine Guex (April 17, 1904, Arcachon – November 20, 1984, Lausanne) was a Swiss psychologist. She was particularly known for her work on abandonment syndrome in psychoanalysis.

Born in Arcachon, France, Guex achieved the French baccalauréat and studied at the Rousseau Institute in Geneva. In the 1930s, Guex established a pioneering medical-pedagogical service in Monthey, dedicated to the psychoanalytical treatment of children. Her monograph La névrose d'abandon (1950; English: Abandonment neurosis), later re-published in 1973 under the title Le Syndrome d'abandon, made her reputation international. In it, she describes "abandonment neurosis" as a type of neurosis distinct from other previously defined categories.

== Publications ==
- The Abandonment Neurosis (The History of Psychoanalysis Series) Karnac Books (2015) ISBN 978-1782201915
