= Robert Arkin =

American social psychologist

Robert M. Arkin (August 12, 1950 – December 12, 2016) (Ph.D., University of Southern California) was a social psychologist and member of the social psychology program faculty at Ohio State University. He was primarily known for his research on self-handicapping.

== Research ==
Arkin’s research concerned the self in social interaction, with special emphasis on the uncertain self (self-doubt; self-handicapping and overachievement; personal security and insecurity in the post 9/11 era). Arkin developed the Subjective Overachievement Scale in 2001 to tap feelings of self-doubt coupled with a performance outcome concerns. He was the editor of the books Most Underappreciated: 50 Prominent Social Psychologists Describe Their Most Unloved Work, Handbook of the Uncertain Self (with co-editors Kathryn Oleson and Patrick Carroll), and Handbook of Personal Security (with co-editors Patrick Carroll and Aaron Wichman).

== Honors and Distinctions ==
Arkin was a member of the Society for Experimental Social Psychology. Arkin served more than fourteen years as Associate Editor (Journal of Personality and Social Psychology; Personality and Social Psychology Bulletin) and Editor (Basic and Applied Social Psychology) of major journals in the discipline. Other honors include the Middlebush Chair in Psychology (University of Missouri); serving as Undergraduate Dean (The Ohio State University); and several Department, University and national teaching awards, including the Psi Chi National Distinguished Speaker Award in 2001.
