= Edwina Abbott =

American psychologist

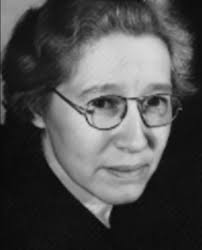
Portrait of Edwina Eunice Abbott

Edwina Eunice Abbott (1887–1949) was an American psychologist who conducted early experimental research on memory and cognition, including work related to what is now known as the testing effect.

== Early life and education ==
Edwina Eunice Abbott was likely born on January 6, 1887 (some less reliable sources claim 1883) in Chicago, Illinois. She attended the University of Illinois for her Bachelor's degree where she wrote her thesis on the analysis of the memory function in orthography in 1908. Influenced by the research of Herman Ebbinghaus and others, she conducted an analysis of the role of recall in the learning process for her Master of Science thesis published in 1909. This work would later be considered pioneering research on the testing effect. She later earned a PhD in Psychology from the University of Chicago in 1914.

== Professional career ==
After her graduation, she established the Wichita Child Research laboratory for developmental and clinical research and treatment in Wichita, Kansas, in which she worked as both a researcher and clinician.

She later became Inaugural Director and Clinical Psychologist of the Wichita Child Guidance Center from its opening date, September 1930 to March, 1941. She was a staff consultant psychologist for a number of social agencies, as well as part of the American Psychological Association and Kansas Psychological Association.

== Research and contributions ==
Abbott was the first psychologist to formally empirically study the testing effect, which she researched as a student for her Master's degree and Doctorate.

== Selected publications ==
- Abott, Edwina E. (1909). "On the analysis of the factor of recall in the learning process". The Psychological Review: Monograph Supplements. 11 (1): 159–177. doi:10.1037/h0093018. ISSN 0096-9753.
- Abbot, Edwina E. (1909). "On the analysis of the memory consciousness in orthography". The Psychological Review: Monograph Supplements. 11 (1): 127–158. doi:10.1037/h0093013. ISSN 0096-9753.
- Washburn, M. F.; Abbott, Edwina (1912). "Experiments on the brightness value of red for the light-adapted eye of the rabbit". Journal of Animal Behavior. 2 (3): 145–180. doi:10.1037/h0072790. ISSN 0095-9928.
- Abbott, Edwina (March 1914). "The effect of adaptation on the temperature difference limen". The Psychological Monographs. 16 (2).
