= Ifmad =

International Forum on Mood and Anxiety Disorders
- Abbreviation: IFMAD
- Formation: 2000
- Headquarters: Monaco (Principality of Monaco)
- Chairman: Siegfried Kasper
- Co-Chairman: Stuart Montgomery
- Website: ifmad.org

International Forum on Mood and Anxiety Disorders or IFMAD is a professional organisation with the aim of spreading awareness of the latest international trend, research and innovations related to mood and anxiety disorders while encouraging the exchange of ideas among the psychiatric community all over the world. Professor Siegfried Kasper and Professor Stuart Montgomery jointly founded IFMAD in the year 2000 which received supports from a scientific committee composed of prominent individuals in the domain of mood and anxiety disorders from across the world.

== Activities ==
The organization is known to convey annual congress to encourage discussion and debate in the field of mood and anxiety disorder. This annual event has become an important forum for the exchange of ideas and a key part of the congress calendar. IFMAD is affiliated with the Union of International Associations. The 18th International Forum on Mood and Anxiety Disorders held in Vienna received endorsement from various organizations including the Association Internationale pour la promotion de Formations Spécialisées en Médecine et en Sciences Biologiques (AFISM).

== Conferences ==
Year	Title	Venue	Abstract	Final Program	Website	References
2025	"20th International Forum on Mood and Anxiety Disorders (IFMAD) (04 - 06 June 2025)"	Budapest				
2021	"19th International Forum on Mood and Anxiety Disorders (22 -24 July 2021)"	Virtual edition				
2019	"18th International Forum on Mood and Anxiety Disorders (4 - 6 July 2019)"	Vienna				
2017	"17th International Forum on Mood and Anxiety Disorders (14 - 17 December 2017)"	Madrid				
2016	"16th International Forum on Mood and Anxiety Disorders (8 - 10 December 2016)"	Rome				
2015	"15th International Forum on Mood and Anxiety Disorders (2 - 4 December 2015)"	Prague				
2014	"14th International Forum on Mood and Anxiety Disorders (from 10 to 12 December 2014)"	Vienna				
2013	"13th International Forum on Mood and Anxiety Disorders"	Monaco				
2012	"12th International Forum on Mood and Anxiety Disorders"	Barcelona				
2011	"11th International Forum on Mood and Anxiety Disorders"	Budapest				
2010	"10th International Forum on Mood and Anxiety Disorders"	Vienna				
2009	"9th International Forum on Mood and Anxiety Disorders"	Monaco				
2008	"8th International Forum on Mood and Anxiety Disorders"	Vienna				
2007	"7th International Forum on Mood and Anxiety Disorders"	Budapest				
2006	"6th International Forum on Mood and Anxiety Disorders"	Vienna				
2005	"5th International Forum on Mood and Anxiety Disorders"	Vienna				
2003	"4th International Forum on Mood and Anxiety Disorders"	Monaco				
2002	"3rd International Forum on Mood and Anxiety Disorders"	Monaco				
2001	"2nd International Forum on Mood and Anxiety Disorders"	Monaco				
2000	"1st International Forum on Mood and Anxiety Disorders"	Monaco				
