= Suzanne Corkin =

American neuropsychologist (1937–2016)

- Born: Suzanne Hammond; May 18, 1937; Hartford, Connecticut, U.S.
- Died: May 24, 2016 (aged 79); Danvers, Massachusetts, U.S.
- Education: Smith College (B.A.); McGill University (M.Sc., Ph.D.)
- Known for: Studies of human memory; work with H.M.
- Spouse: Charles Corkin (divorced)
- Children: 3
- Scientific career
- Fields: Neuroscience; Psychology
- Workplaces: Massachusetts Institute of Technology
- Thesis: Somesthetic function after focal cerebral damage in man (1964)
- Doctoral advisor: Brenda Milner
- Doctoral students: John Gabrieli; Christopher I. Moore
- Other notable students: Neal J. Cohen (postdoc)
- Website: Archived Sept. 28, 2013

Suzanne Corkin (May 18, 1937 – May 24, 2016) was an American professor of neuroscience in the Department of Brain and Cognitive Sciences at MIT. She was a leading scholar in neuropsychology and cognitive neuroscience. She is best known for her research on human memory, which she studied in patients with Alzheimer's disease, Parkinson's disease, and amnesia. She is also well known for studying H.M., a man with memory loss whom she met in 1962 and studied until his death in 2008.

== Early life and education ==
Corkin was born Suzanne Janet Hammond in Hartford, Connecticut; she was the only child of Lester and Mabelle Dowling Hammond. She studied psychology at Smith College in Massachusetts, and obtained a PhD at McGill University in Montreal, Canada, supervised by Brenda Milner. Milner studied a man named Henry Molaison, who had sustained severe memory loss as a result of brain surgery for uncontrolled epileptic seizures. Corkin met him in 1962 and tested his memory relating to his sense of touch "Somesthetic function after focal cerebral damage" which became the subject of her PhD.

== Career ==
After she completed her PhD in 1964 she moved to the US Massachusetts Institute of Technology (MIT), to join the laboratory of Hans-Lukas Teuber. In 1977, when Teuber died, Corkin became director of the human neuropsychology laboratory and, in 1981, was promoted directly from the position of principal research scientist to associate professor with tenure.

From that point forward, Corkin directed the Behavioral Neuroscience Laboratory, making seminal contributions to many different domains of cognitive neuroscience. These contributions included further delineation of memory systems required for different forms of nondeclarative learning, elucidation of memory deficits that arise in Parkinson's disease, Alzheimer's disease, and contributions toward theoretical debates regarding the role of the medial temporal lobe in the retrieval of remote memories.

Corkin was also an early adopter of human neuroimaging methods and used these methods to elucidate the neural bases of different forms of human memory and of age- and disease-related changes in memory networks. She utilized both functional and structural MRI methods. Some of the last publications from her laboratory reported the benefits of a multispectral structural magnetic resonance imaging method for measuring the volumes of the substantia nigra and basal forebrain in patients with Parkinson's disease (Ziegler and Corkin, 2013; Ziegler et al., 2013).

Corkin continued to work with the amnesic patient H.M., protecting his identity until his death in 2008, at which point his identity was revealed to be Henry Molaison. She discussed the story of H.M. in her 2013 book Permanent Present Tense.

In 1994, Corkin was one of 16 women faculty in the School of Science at MIT who drafted and co-signed a letter to the then-dean of science (now chancellor of Berkeley) Robert Birgeneau, which started a campaign to highlight and challenge gender discrimination at MIT.

== Publications and awards ==
She published over 150 research articles and was author or co-author of 10 books. She received numerous awards for her research, including a MERIT award from the National Institutes of Health and the Baltes Distinguished Research Achievement Award from the American Psychological Association, Division on Aging.

== Mentorship ==
Corkin was widely recognized for her advocacy for women and minorities in science. During her time at MIT, she was a freshman advisor for 17 years, and served on a number of institute and departmental committees. In 2011, she received the Brain and Cognitive Sciences Undergraduate Advising Award at MIT.

== New York Times article controversy ==
An August 7, 2016, New York Times article by Luke Dittrich generated controversy when it questioned the ethics of Corkin in her dealings with Henry Molaison. This report suggested that Corkin attempted to suppress research findings that H.M. had a preexisting frontal lobe lesion; did not locate the genetically closest living relative to H.M. from whom to obtain consent (legal proceedings instead appointed a distant relative as conservator); and sought to shred her original source material and unpublished data because it could potentially lead to a reexamination of her conclusions during her decades of research on H.M. (This final assertion derives from a recording of an interview that Dittrich carried out with Corkin. In it, although she does discuss shredding materials, she also states "We kept the H.M. stuff.")

Controversy is ongoing in regard to Dittrich's article. Over 200 neuroscientists signed a letter to the New York Times stating that the article was biased and misleading and as of August 21, 2016, there continues to be back-and-forth statements released by MIT and by Dittrich. Because there were well-known tensions between Dittrich and Corkin for many years, some reviewers have called Dittrich's book a "personal vendetta" Yet others have favorably reviewed his book, Patient H.M.: A Story of Memory, Madness, and Family Secrets.

== Personal life ==
Her marriage to Charles Corkin ended in divorce. She died of liver cancer in Danvers, Massachusetts, on May 24, 2016, at age 78. She is survived by three adult children, Damon, J. Zachary, and Jocelyn Corkin, as well as seven grandchildren.
