= Nicole Weekes =

American psychologist

Nicole Y. Weekes
- Education: University of California, Los Angeles; Boston University
- Scientific career
- Fields: Psychology; neuroscience

Nicole Y. Weekes is an American psychologist and neuroscientist whose work focuses on the psychological and biological response to stress. She is the Harry S. and L. Madge Rice Thatcher Professor of Psychological Science and Professor of Neuroscience at Pomona College in Claremont, California.

== Early life ==
Weekes earned her bachelor's degree from Boston University and her doctorate from the University of California, Los Angeles.

== Career ==
Weekes began teaching at Pomona College in 1998. In 2016, she was appointed Associate Dean of Faculty to help lead efforts to further diversify its ranks. She has won the Wig Distinguished Professor Award, the college's highest faculty honor, in recognition of her teaching on three occasions, in 2001, 2006, and 2011.
