= Rivka Yahav =

Israeli psychologist

- רבקה יהב
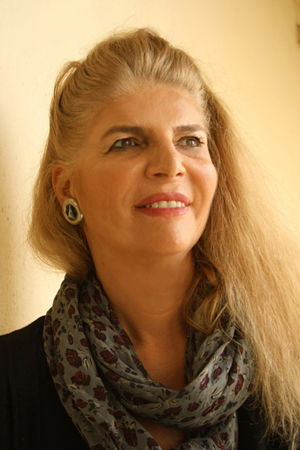
- Professor Rivka Yahav, 2015
- Born: September 4, 1950; Haifa, Israel

Rivka Yahav (Hebrew: רבקה יהב; born 4 September 1950) is an academic psychotherapist, an academic faculty member of the School of Social Work, Head of the Psychotherapy Training Programme at Haifa University, and Head of the Interdisciplinary Clinical Center of the Faculty of Welfare and Health Sciences at Haifa University. She was awarded the Prime Minister's Prize for Initiatives and Innovation in 2012.

== Biography ==
Rivka Yahav was born in Haifa in 1950; her parents immigrated to Israel two years before that on the boat “Exodus”. Many members of her father's family, from Galicia in Poland, were killed in the Holocaust. Her mother's father, a soldier in the Russian army, was killed in World War II.

Yahav attended Hugim High School in Haifa and served in the Intelligence Services. In November 1971 she married Yehuda Monheim, a mechanical engineering student at the Technion. Nearly 2 years later, on October 17, 1973, while crossing the Suez Canal, First Lieutenant Monheit was killed by a shell that struck the barge he was commanding. Three days later, Yahav gave birth to their eldest child, a son. In 1983, she married Yona Yahav (who was elected mayor of Haifa in 2003). When they were married, Yona Yahav asked to adopt her son. The couple then conducted a legal battle that led to a change in the Names Law. “The amendment allowed adopted children, who are the offspring of Israeli war casualties, to maintain the family name of their deceased parents, thereby preserving and commemorating their memory”.

In 1970, Yahav began her academic studies at the School of Social Work, Haifa University, completing her BA in 1973, and her MA in Social Work in 1978. Her masters thesis dealt with “Assertive Behaviour for Promoting Leadership”. Between 1987 and 1990, she studied psychotherapy at the Medical School associated with Rambam Hospital in Haifa. She completed her PhD studies in 1996 in Haifa University's School of Education. Her doctoral thesis was on the topic of “The Symptomatic Child as Maintainer of the Family Unit”. Parallel to her studies, Yahav worked as a social worker and psychotherapist in various frameworks: schools, psychological services for students at the Technion (1975–1990), Rambam and Carmel Hospitals, and in private clinical practice. Yahav has served as Director of the Interdisciplinary Community Clinic at Haifa University starting in 2002. In the summer of 2009, she was elected as chairperson of the Israeli Psychotherapy Organization, a role she maintained until 2013. Yahav became an associate professor (expert track) in 2010 at Haifa University. Married and the mother of a son and two daughters, she lives in Haifa.

== Activities in academic administration ==
=== Teaching and supervision ===
Beginning in 1982, Yahav has taught and directed training programmes that provide instruction in a variety of psychotherapy approaches in the Continuing Education Department of the Faculty of Welfare and Health Sciences at Haifa University. In 1993 she was appointed Director of the Department. In this role, which she held for 6 years until 1999, she established the three-year psychotherapy training programme, the two-year group facilitator programme and developed a wide variety of training programmes in therapy, welfare and health. Parallel to this, and alongside all her various activities over the years, Yahav supervised students, staff and colleagues and taught as an academic faculty member of the School of Social Work.

=== Psychotherapy training programme ===
Beginning in 1994, Yahav served as the academic director and chairperson of the steering committee in the three-year psychotherapy training programme. The programme was designed for clinicians with MA degrees and higher. She guided the programme through the licensing process until it was recognized by the Israel Psychotherapy Organization. Over the years, over 400 students with advanced degrees completed the programme. There have been 25 lecturer and, group facilitators-supervisors. In addition, about 60 external supervisors have been associated with the training. Within the framework of this role, which she continues to this day, Yahav is responsible for preparing multi-year study programmes, bringing in lecturers, overseeing the supervision process, interviewing and selecting students and supervising the professional team.

=== Interdisciplinary Clinical Center ===
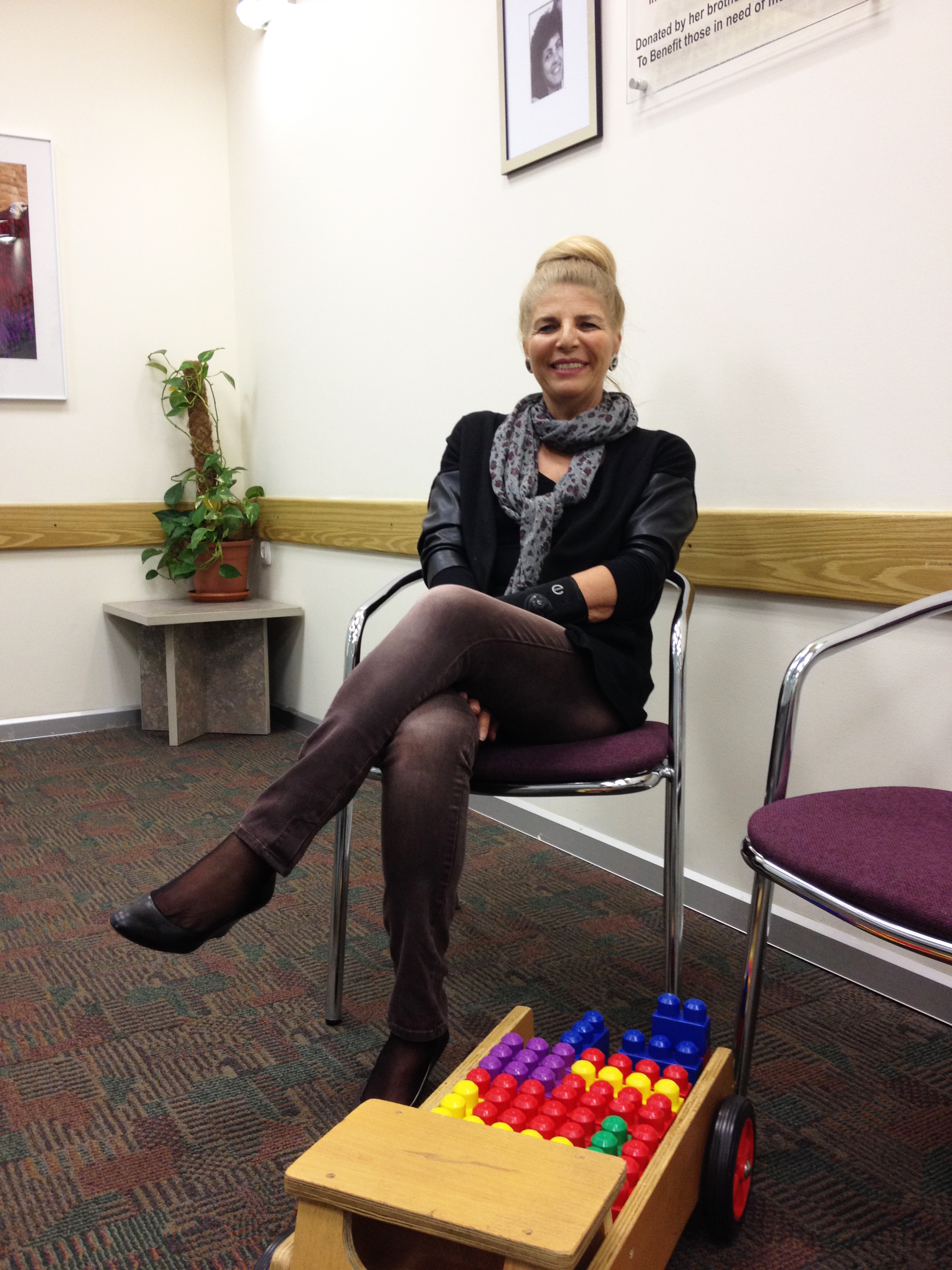
Rivka Yahav in The Interdisciplinary Clinical Center, University of Haifa, 2015.

In 2002, Yahav founded the Interdisciplinary Clinical Center (ICC) and she continues to direct the center. The ICC provides services to the community, offering interventions at the individual, family, group and organization levels, as part of the Haifa University's Faculty of Social Welfare and Health Sciences, that include the Departments of Speech Therapy, Occupational Therapy, the School of Social Work, Physiotherapy, and Gerontology. Treatments are provided by an interdisciplinary team drawn from the 60 professionals connected with the programme (speech therapists, occupational therapists, social workers, psychologists, expressive arts therapists, and organizational counsellors), who intervene with an interdisciplinary approach to assessment and clinical needs of clients of all ages. The ICC specializes in services to the community and to special needs populations, and its uniqueness is in its work with families with low socio-economic status. Assessment, therapy and supervision are provided in both the university-based center and in various institutions in the community. The ICC houses the Institute for Speech Pathology, The Audiological Institute, and Occupational Therapy Institute, and the Center for Computer Applications, alongside the Psychotherapy Institute established by Yahav and run by her until 2007. In 2014, the Cognitive Assessment Institute was established in the ICC. The range of activities in the ICC involve hundreds of clients receiving help in the various center institutes, and dozens of students who completed the practicum requirements of their professional training in the center. The ICC effectiveness is assessed by ongoing evaluation research. As part of her duties in directing the ICC, Yahav has raised funds in Israel and abroad that are earmarked for community projects.

=== Other activities ===
Beginning in the 1980s, Yahav has directed high quality training programmes in the Continuing Education Unit of Haifa University and she is participates in activities undertaken in various frameworks of the university: a member of the Family Research and Study Center, of the School of Social Work, a member of the governing council of the Institute for the Study of Emotions, a member of the governing council of the International Center for the Study of Loss, Bereavement and Psychological Resilience, and the Institute for the Study of the Holocaust, a member of the “Helsinki Council” in the mental health center “Tiral HaCarmel”, a member of the governing council of the academic journal, “Sichot”, and beginning in 2009, a member of the governing council of the Haifa University Publishing Office. She has organized and presented at dozens of study days and conferences dealing with a wide range of social and psychological issues, and she lectures in Israel and abroad. Similarly, Yahav is a reviewer of articles submitted for consideration for publication in academic journals, supervises and judges graduate theses, and she reviews professional books for the journal “Sichot”.

== Her clinical work ==
At the beginning of her career (1973–1975), using play, therapeutic discussions and parent guidance as her means of intervention, Yahav worked with children, adolescents and their parents. For 15 years, beginning in 1975, she worked at the Technion's Psychological Services where she specialized in psychotherapy for young adults with a variety of difficulties: students suffering from exam anxiety, shyness, depression, personality disorders, eating disorders, interpersonal problems, identity issues, separation difficulties, marital problems, and more. Her therapeutic work is based on classic and contemporary psychodynamic theory, psychosocial approaches, cognitive-behavioural approaches and a number of family therapy approaches. In 1978–1979, Yahav worked with patients of Rambam Hospital's Psychiatric Clinic who were living in the community, conducting family interventions as well. In the 1980s, Yahav opened a private clinic that she maintains to the present day. She generally sees long-term psychodynamic psychotherapy clients and she supervises other clinicians. Toward the mid-1980s, the emphasis in her work and her therapy moved to theories she saw as more complex and she deepened her studies and therapy, studying Jungian psychotherapy and afterward classic and contemporary psychodynamic approaches: Freud's Drive Theory, Anna Freud's Ego-Psychology Theory, Object Relations Theory of Fairburn, Melanie Klein and Winnicott, and self-psychology and inter-subjective psychology. Yahav applies these approaches when conducting psychotherapy with adults, in parental guidance. This clinical work provides a fertile base upon which to do research.

== Research and clinical work topics ==
=== Difficulties in love relationships ===
Yahav is very involved in research into the study of love relationships: the difference between love and falling in love, cultural differences in love relationships, the difference between dependence and giving in love relationships, the space between fantasy and reality, obsessive love, and more. She is studying the question: does love lie in the longing or in its satisfaction? Given that love is an enigmatic term, her research explores these issues using questionnaires, interviews, and case studies to shed light on repetitive patterns and their origins in early childhood—in patterns of attachment and object relations—that cause certain people to be attracted a partner who is not interested in them or to select a partner who is inappropriate or abusive and who fills their psycho life with a sense of frustration and depression. With this body of knowledge, Prof Yahav is trying to explore the means for modifying these damaging patterns and moving on to satisfying love relationships. Over the years, Yahav has implemented this knowledge in her clinical work: beginning in 1975, when she worked at the Students’ Psychological Services at the Technion as an individual, couples and group therapist using psychodynamic and cognitive-behavioural approaches, and beginning in the 1980s in her private practice. Her book entitled, Difficulties in Love Relationships, co-authored with Prof Eliezer Witztum, will be published by Arieh Nir Publishers.

=== Developmental guidance with preschoolers ===
The model for developmental guidance was developed by Yahav in 2004 and was implemented in 80 preschool classes. Wizo and Na’amat in Haifa are now implementing the model, each with a professional team that includes social workers, speech therapists, occupational therapists, psychologists and expressive arts therapists. Israeli and foreign organizations have studied the project for the purposes of implementing it in other places. Yahav was awarded the Prime Minister's Award for Non-Profit Initiative and Innovation for this work. Yahav succeeded in raising funds to support the project and therefore treatment can be carried out in the children's natural environment, without stigma, and to make the services available to children in families with low socio-economic status. The project was also specially adapted for children from families that immigrated from Ethiopia; leaders from the Ethiopian community in Haifa were involved in this adaptation. Yahav is involved in the project “Parents in the Center”, a multi-disciplinary project for parents and children aged 0–6 run with the “Haifa-Boston Connection”.

=== Adults and children who experienced stress due to war and terror ===
During the Second Lebanon War, in view of the emergency situation and citizen distress, Yahav founded a hotline for emotional assistance to those suffering from anxiety, operated by with the help of the Interdisciplinary Clinical Center. Following the war, with the knowledge accumulated regarding the impact of stress-generating events during war and acts of terrorism Yahav initiated and led a unique therapeutic project for Ethiopian children and the development of intervention and therapy models for children growing up under the shadow of ongoing terror.

=== Prenatal psychotherapy ===
Yahav's work in prenatal psychotherapy is based upon a body of empirical knowledge that proves that the fetus is capable of sensing and remembering experiences from the period between the moment of conception to birth. The significance of such findings is that impressions experienced before birth have the potential to exert far-reaching and long-term influences on later development and psychological welfare. Clinical work is carried out at the stage at which the decision to bring a child into the world is made, and during pregnancy. The empirical knowledge is brought to bear in the psychological support and assistance that “has therapeutic potential for the mother and is likely to have an effect on the fruit of her womb”. In 2007, Yahav established the Israel Forum for the Advancement of Prenatal Psychology, and she serves as chairperson of the Forum.

== Prizes ==
In 2009, Yahav was awarded the Recanati Chais Rashi Prize for Social Work Initiatives, in honour of her initiative and application of the developmental guidance project, focussed on the early identification and treatment of emotional, behavioural, language and sensory-motor development problems in children aged 3–6. The Prime Minister's Prize for Initiatives and Innovation was awarded to Yahav for the development and implementation of a new method for early identification and treatment of environmental and developmental difficulties for children at risk (such as difficulties related to sensory-motor, language, emotional and behavioural functioning). The treatment initiative, that began in 2004, is successfully operating today in kindergartens and daycare centers around the country and for all population sectors; it serves as a model for raising awareness regarding the effectiveness of treatment with children at risk. Yahav was also awarded a Certificate of Appreciation from the Russian Society of Prenatal and Perinatal Psychology and Medicine, and a Wizo Prize of Esteem for “Women Breaking New Ground”.

== Activities for the community ==
Between the years 1979 and 1990, Yahav was among the group of individuals who founded the Tzafta Center for Advanced Culture in Haifa, and she acted as volunteer head of the membership committee and head of the repertoire committee. Yahav is a graduate of the advanced course for Directorship taught by the Minister of Tourism in preparation for her position as Director of in the Society for the Development of the Old City of Acco. In this position, that she held from 2000 to 2003, she was instrumental in the production of an audio-visual presentation that is permanently on display at the Hamam el Basha, and she initiated the production of promotional films that have been screened on television for the purposes of encouraging tourism in Acco. Similarly, Yahav set up a tourist cruise between Haifa and Acco (it will begin operating in the near future). Beginning in 2001, Yahav was added to the Forum for “Constitution by Agreement”, founded by The Israeli Center for Democracy, for the purpose of putting together a constitution for the State of Israel.
