= Neal J. Cohen =

American psychologist

- Education: University of California, San Diego
- Spouse: Maureen Cohen
- Scientific career
- Workplaces: Beckman Institute for Advanced Science and Technology, University of Illinois at Urbana–Champaign

Neal J. Cohen is a professor of psychology in the Cognitive Neuroscience division of the University of Illinois at Urbana–Champaign. He is appointed as a full-time faculty member in the Beckman Institute for Advanced Science and Technology at the University of Illinois. He is the founding director of the Center for Nutrition, Learning, and Memory (CNLM), a partnership of the University of Illinois and Abbott Laboratories as of 2011. He is also the founding director of the Interdisciplinary Health Sciences Initiative (IHSI) at the University of Illinois, formed 2014.

Cohen is known for his work on memory, amnesia, and learning, particularly his theories of multiple memory systems and the role of the hippocampus in relational memory. He is a co-author of Memory, Amnesia, and the Hippocampal System (1993) and From conditioning to conscious recollection: Memory systems of the brain (2001).

== Education and career ==
Neal Jay Cohen is the son of Albert and Natalie Cohen. He attended the University of California, San Diego, where he became interested in amnesia and how memory and learning work. After working with Larry Squire, Cohen received his Ph.D. in 1981. He went on to the Massachusetts Institute of Technology (MIT), first as a postdoctoral researcher, and then as a research scientist. While at MIT he worked with neuroscientist Suzanne Corkin. He then joined the faculty of Johns Hopkins University, where he collaborated with Michael McCloskey. In 1990 Cohen joined the Beckman Institute for Advanced Science and Technology at the University of Illinois at Urbana–Champaign, where he became the director of the Amnesia Research Laboratory.

Cohen has collaborated extensively with Howard Eichenbaum. During "the first and only time during our collaboration that we were actually able to physically work together for any extended period of time", a leave that Cohen spent at Wellesley College, they began work on the book Memory, Amnesia, and the Hippocampal System (1993). They have since published another book, From conditioning to conscious recollection: Memory systems of the brain (2001).

On December 19, 2011, it was announced that Neal Cohen would be the founding director of the Center for Nutrition, Learning, and Memory (CNLM), a multi-disciplinary institute for the study of nutrition, learning and memory, created through a partnership of the University of Illinois and Abbott Laboratories. It was said to be the first multi-disciplinary center for nutrition and cognition research in the world.

On June 30, 2014, Neal Cohen was named the founding director of the Interdisciplinary Health Sciences Initiative (IHSI) at the University of Illinois. Cohen has been active in promoting and working to establish the Carle Illinois College of Medicine, proposed for the University of Illinois. He has served on the president's advisory task force, the committee to develop the new institution's core curriculum, and on the search committee to recruit the inaugural dean.

== Research ==
Prior to the ground-breaking work of Brenda Milner, Suzanne Corkin and others studying the amnesiac patient Henry Molaison, researchers had assumed that memory was an emergent property of the cerebral cortex or brain as a whole. Because of H.M., they began to explore the possibility that there were multiple memory systems in the brain: different types of learning and memory that were supported by mechanisms in different areas. In particular, the medial temporal lobe was involved in the creation of new memories and their consolidation, but not their storage.

Cohen has made important contributions to this research, beginning with his Ph.D. work. In 1980, at the University of California, San Diego, Neal Cohen and Larry Squire were able to show that amnesic patients were just as effective as normal subjects at the task of learning to read mirror-reversed print. The types of skills affected by amnesia were fundamentally different: patients' ability to learn certain types of motor skills, "knowing how", was not affected, even though their ability to remember what had happened, "knowing that", was affected. This result supported the distinction between procedural and declarative knowledge and the idea that they are based on different physiological memory systems in the brain. In 1981 Cohen received his Ph.D. for the thesis Neuropsychological Evidence for a Distinction Between Procedural and Declarative Knowledge in Human Memory and Amnesia.

Since then, through interdisciplinary and convergent studies, Cohen has attempted to more fully understand ways in which experience is represented and stored by the brain. A major focus of his work has been the role played by the hippocampus, located in the medial temporal lobe of the brain, in forming relational memories. Cohen and Howard Eichenbaum have developed a theory of memory, learning and amnesia, known as relational memory theory. In this view, the hippocampus is essential in elemental cognitive processes that bind elements of experience in memory, and link memories together, forming a representation of the relations among "the constituent elements of experience" referred to as a "memory space". The hippocampus rapidly forms associations between incoming information about people, places, objects, and their spatial, temporal, and interactional relationships, and connects them to reactivated relational memories. In the underlying representational scheme, events are represented as relations among elements of experience in a particular context. Episodes are represented as the flow of events across time. Memory is represented as a dynamic and flexible relational network of events and episodes, from which novel inferences can be drawn. For example, a person's name and their face are stored as separate pieces of information in the brain, but bound together in relational memory so that the person can be recognized the next time they are seen. The property of "representational flexibility" is considered to be critical, and as derivable from "the kind of system that must necessarily evolve to store environmental spatial information".

Cohen has also examined the question of whether memory for certain types of relations is more heavily dependent on the activity of the hippocampus, and whether there are types of memories that do not depend on the hippocampus. His goal is to understand the functional architecture underlying memory: the neural substrates and subsystems of the hippocampal memory system.

Cohen has developed new approaches and methodologies for assessing memory. Approaches include eye movement monitoring, structural and functional brain imaging, and computational modeling methods. Some of the techniques involved are functional Magnetic Resonance Imaging (fMRI), Diffusion Tensor Imaging (DTI), Diffuse Optical Imaging, Event Related Brain Potentials (ERPs), and Magnetoencephalography (MEG). Techniques such as eye movements make it possible to assess responses without relying on verbal reports. Computers can be used to examine where a person directs their attention, and relate patterns of attention to the person's previous exposure to a stimulus and their conscious and unconscious levels of response.

Cohen works with the general population and with specific populations of patients experiencing memory impairments or brain disorders. He is involved in neuropsychological studies and in developing specific interventions. The focus of the research is basic, rather than therapeutic. However, it is hoped that understanding the types of deficits affecting a patient, in specific cases, may make it possible to identify and take advantage of their remaining strengths to improve their interactions with others. Because of a lack of facilities in Champaign-Urbana, Cohen and his students travel to medical schools elsewhere to work with patients who have brain disorders such as amnesia, Alzheimer's disease, or schizophrenia. Cohen has collaborated extensively with Melissa C. Duff and others at the University of Iowa College of Medicine, Iowa City, as well as with researchers at Washington University, Vanderbilt, Northwestern and Rush Medical College.

== Awards and honors ==
In 2012, Cohen was one of six Illinois professors elected to membership in the American Association for the Advancement of Science, in recognition of his “pioneering research on memory and amnesia, distinguishing brain systems and psychological characteristics that distinguish declarative and procedural memory.”
