= John B. Watson =

American psychologist (1878–1958)

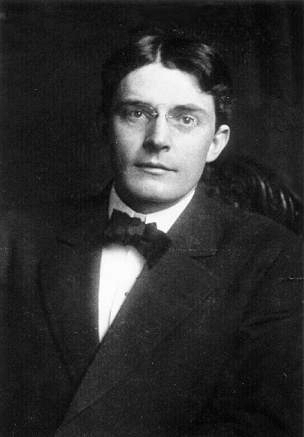
- Born: John Broadus Watson; January 9, 1878; Travelers Rest, South Carolina, US
- Died: September 25, 1958 (aged 80); Upper Manhattan, New York City
- Education: Furman University (MA); University of Chicago (PhD)
- Known for: Founding behaviorism Methodological behaviorism Behavior modification
- Scientific career
- Fields: Psychology
- Doctoral advisor: J. R. Angell
- Other academic advisors: John Dewey, H. H. Donaldson, Jacques Loeb

John Broadus Watson (January 9, 1878 – September 25, 1958) was an American psychologist who popularized the scientific theory of behaviorism, establishing it as a psychological school. Watson advanced this change in the psychological discipline through his 1913 address at Columbia University, titled Psychology as the Behaviorist Views It. Through his behaviorist approach, Watson conducted research on animal behavior, child rearing, and advertising, as well as conducting the controversial "Little Albert" experiment and the Kerplunk experiment. He was also the editor of Psychological Review from 1910 to 1915. A Review of General Psychology survey, published in 2002, ranked Watson as the 17th most cited psychologist of the 20th century.

== Early life ==
Watson was born on January 9, 1878 in Travelers Rest, South Carolina. His father, Pickens Butler Watson, was an alcoholic and left the family to live with two Indian women when John was 13 years old. His mother, Emma Kesiah Watson (née Roe), was a very religious woman who adhered to prohibitions against drinking, smoking, and dancing, naming her son John after a prominent Baptist minister in hopes that it would help him receive the call to preach the Gospel. In bringing him up, she subjected Watson to harsh religious training that later led him to develop a lifelong antipathy toward all forms of religion and to become an atheist. (Note: Kimble, Gregory A., Michael Wertheimer, and Charlotte White. 2013.Portraits of Pioneers in Psychology. Psychology Press. "Watson's outspoken atheism repelled many in Greensville." (p. 175).) (Note: Martin, Michael. 2006. The Cambridge Companion to Atheism. Cambridge: Cambridge University Press. "Among celebrity atheists with much biographical data, we find leading psychologists and psychoanalysts. We could provide a long list, including…John B. Watson." (p. 310).)

In an attempt to escape poverty, Watson's mother sold their farm and brought Watson to Greenville, South Carolina, to provide him a better opportunity for success. Moving from an isolated, rural location to the town of Greenville, which then had a population of 8,000, proved to be important for Watson, giving him the opportunity to experience a variety of different types of people, which he used to cultivate his theories on psychology. Watson also held some racist beliefs, believed to be more extreme than most at the time, and was arrested for doing hate crimes against African American people in the Greenville area only being saved by his mother's influence with the local Baptist church.

== Marriage and children ==
While he was in graduate school, Watson married Mary Ickes, sister of the newspaper reporter Harold L. Ickes, later a politician. They had two children, also named John and Mary Ickes Watson, the latter of whom attempted suicide later in life. Young Mary and her husband, Paul Hartley, had a daughter, Mariette Hartley, an actor who suffered from psychological issues that she attributed to her being raised according to her grandfather's theories.

Watson's wife later sought a divorce due to his ongoing affair with a student, Rosalie Rayner (1898–1935). In searching Rayner's bedroom, Mary discovered love letters from Watson. The affair became front-page news in Baltimore. The publicity resulted in Johns Hopkins University asking Watson to resign his faculty position in October 1920.

In 1921, following the finalization of the divorce, Watson and Rayner married in New Jersey, and had two sons, William Rayner Watson (1921) and James Broadus Watson (1924), who were raised with the behaviorist principles that John espoused throughout his career. The couple remained together until Rayner's death at age 36 in 1935. Like their half-sister, both sons later attempted suicide, with William killing himself in 1954.

== Later life and death ==
Watson burned his letters and personal papers, thus depriving historians of a resource for understanding the early history of behaviorism and of Watson himself.

Historian John Burnham interviewed Watson late in life, presenting him as a man of strong opinions and some bitterness towards his detractors. In 1957, shortly before his death, Watson received a Gold Medal from the American Psychological Association for his contributions to psychology.

Watson lived on his farm until his death in 1958 at age 80, at Columbia-Presbyterian Medical Center in Upper Manhattan. He was buried at Willowbrook Cemetery, Westport, Connecticut.

== Education ==
Despite his poor academic performance and having been arrested twice during high school—first for fighting, then for discharging firearms within city limits—Watson was able to use his mother's connections to gain admission to Greenville's Furman University at the age of 16. There, he would complete a few psychology courses, though never excelling. He would also consider himself to be a poor student, holding a few jobs on campus to pay for his college expenses. Others thought him as quiet, lazy, and insubordinate, and, as such, he continued to see himself as "unsocial," making few friends. Nevertheless, being a precocious student, Watson would leave Furman with a master's degree at the age of 21.

After graduating, Watson spent a year at Batesburg Institute, the name he gave to a one-room school in Greenville, at which he was principal, janitor, and handyman. Watson entered the University of Chicago after petitioning the University President. The successful petition would be central to his ascent into the psychology world, as his college experience introduced him to professors and colleagues who would be integral to his success in developing psychology into a credible field of study. Watson began studying philosophy under John Dewey on the recommendation of Furman professor, Gordon Moore. The combined influence of Dewey, James Rowland Angell, Henry Herbert Donaldson, and Jacques Loeb, led Watson to develop a highly descriptive, objective approach to the analysis of behavior, an approach he would later call behaviorism. Wanting to make psychology more scientifically acceptable, Watson thought of the approach as a declaration of faith, based on the idea that a methodology could transform psychology into a scientific discipline. Later, Watson became interested in the work of Ivan Pavlov (1849–1936), and eventually included a highly simplified version of Pavlov's principles in his popular works.

=== Dissertation on animal behavior ===
Watson earned his PhD from the University of Chicago in 1903. In his dissertation, "Animal Education", he described the relationship between brain myelination and learning ability in rats at different ages. Watson showed that the degree of myelinization was largely related to learning ability. Watson stayed at the University of Chicago for five years doing research on the relationship between sensory input and learning. He discovered that the kinesthetic sense controlled the behavior of rats running in mazes. In 1908, Watson was offered and accepted a faculty position at Johns Hopkins University and was immediately promoted to chair of the psychology department.

== Behaviorism ==
In 1913, Watson published the article "Psychology as the Behaviorist Views It" (also called "The Behaviorist Manifesto"). In the "Manifesto", Watson outlines the major features of his new philosophy of psychology, behaviorism, with the first paragraph of the article concisely describing Watson's behaviorist position:

Psychology as the behaviorist views it is a purely objective experimental branch of natural science. Its theoretical goal is the prediction and control of behavior. Introspection forms no essential part of its methods, nor is the scientific value of its data dependent upon the readiness with which they lend themselves to interpretation in terms of consciousness. The behaviorist, in his efforts to get a unitary scheme of animal response, recognizes no dividing line between man and brute. The behavior of man, with all of its refinement and complexity, forms only a part of the behaviorist's total scheme of investigation.

In 1913, Watson viewed Pavlov's conditioned reflex as primarily a physiological mechanism controlling glandular secretions. He had already rejected Edward L. Thorndike's 'law of effect' (a precursor to B. F. Skinner's principle of reinforcement) due to what Watson believed were unnecessary subjective elements. It was not until 1916 that he would recognize the more general significance of Pavlov's formulation, after which Watson would make such the subject of his presidential address to the American Psychological Association. The article is also notable for its strong defense of the objective scientific status of applied psychology, which at the time was considered to be much inferior to the established structuralist experimental psychology.

With his notion of behaviorism, Watson put the emphasis on external behavior of people and their reactions on given situations, rather than the internal, mental state of those people. In his opinion, the analysis of behaviors and reactions was the only objective method to get insight in the human actions. This outlook—combined with the complementary ideas of determinism, evolutionary continuism, and empiricism—has contributed to what is sometimes called Methodological Behaviorism (not to be confused with the Radical Behaviorism of Skinner). It was this new perspective that Watson claimed would lead psychology into a new era. He claimed that prior to Wilhelm Wundt, there was no psychology, and that after Wundt there was only confusion and anarchy. It was Watson's new behaviorism that would pave the way for further advancements in psychology.

Watson's behaviorism rejected the studying of consciousness. He was convinced that it could not be studied, and that past attempts to do so have only been hindering the advancement of psychological theories. He felt that introspection was faulty at best and awarded researchers nothing but more issues. He pushed for psychology to no longer be considered the science of the 'mind'. Instead, he stated that psychology should focus on the 'behavior' of the individual, not their consciousness.

Meanwhile, Watson served as the president of the Southern Society for Philosophy and Psychology in 1915.

=== Language, speech, and memory ===
Watson argued that mental activity could not be observed. In his book, Behaviorism (1924), Watson discussed his thoughts on what language really is, which leads to a discussion of what words really are, and finally to an explanation of what memory is. They are all manual devices used by humans that result in thinking. By using anecdotes that illustrate the behaviors and activities of mammals, Watson outlined his behaviorist views on these topics.

Watson refers to language as a "manipulative habit," because when we speak language, the sound originates in our larynx, which is a body instrument that we manipulate every time we talk in order to hear our "voice." As we change our throat shape and tongue position, different sounds are made. Watson explains that when a baby first cries, or first says "da" or "ma," that it is learning language. To further his theory, Watson and his wife conducted an experiment in which they conditioned a baby to say "da-da" when he wanted his bottle. Although the baby was conditioned and was a success for a short while, the conditioning was eventually lost. Watson argues, however, that as the child got older, he would imitate Watson as a result of Watson imitating him. By three years old, the child needed no help developing his vocabulary because he was learning from others. Thus, language is imitative.

Watson goes on to claim that, "words are but substitutes for objects and situations." In his earlier baby experiment, the baby learned to say "da" when he wanted a bottle, or "mama" when he wanted his mom, or "shoe-da" when he pointed to his father's shoe. Watson then argues that "we watch our chances and build upon these," meaning human babies have to form their language by applying sounds they have already formed. This, Watson says, is why babies point to an object but call it a different word. Lastly, Watson explains how a child learns to read words: a mom points at each word and reads in a patterned manner, and eventually, because the child recognizes the word with the sound, he or she learns to read it back.

This, according to Watson, is the start of memory. All of the ideas previously mentioned are what Watson says make up our memory, and that we carry the memory we develop throughout our lives. Watson tells the tale of Mr. Addison Sims and his friend in order to illustrate these ideas. A friend of Mr. Sims' sees Mr. Sims on a street sidewalk and exclaims: "Upon my life! Addison Sims of Seattle! I haven't seen you since the World's Fair in Chicago. Do you remember the gay parties we used to have in the old Windermere Hotel?" Even after all of this, Mr. Sims cannot remember the man's name, although they were old friends who used to encounter many of the same people, places, and experiences together. Watson argued that if the two men were to do some of their old shared activities and go to some of the old same places (the stimuli), then the response (or memory) would occur.

=== Study of emotions ===
Watson was interested in the conditioning of emotions. Of course behaviorism putting an emphasis on people's external behaviors, emotions were considered as mere physical responses. Watson thought that, at birth, there are three unlearned emotional reactions:

- Fear: evoked by only two stimuli that are unconditioned—a sudden noise or the loss of (physical) support. However, because older children are afraid of many things (e.g. different animals, strange people etc.), it must be that such fear-provoking stimuli are learned. Fear can be observed by the following reaction with infants: crying, rapid breathing, eyes closing, or sudden jumping.
- Rage: an innate response to the body movement of the child being constrained. If a very young child is held in a way that she cannot move at all, then she will begin to scream and stiffen her body. Later this reaction is applied to different situations, e.g. children get angry when they are forced to take a bath or clean their room. These situations provoke rage because they are associated with physical restraint.
- Love: an automatic response from infants when tickled, patted, or stroked lightly. The infant responds with smiles, laughs, and other affectionate responses. According to Watson, infants do not love specific people, they are only conditioned to do so. Because the mother's face is progressively associated with the patting and stroking, it becomes the conditioned stimulus eliciting the affection towards her. Affectionate feelings, for people later, generate the same response because they are somehow associated with the mother.

== Use of children ==
=== "Little Albert" experiment (1920) ===
One might consider the experiment Watson and his assistant Rosalie Rayner carried out in 1920 to be one of the most controversial in psychology. It has become immortalized in introductory psychology textbooks as the Little Albert experiment. The goal of the experiment was to show how principles of, at the time recently discovered, classical conditioning could be applied to condition fear of a white rat into "Little Albert", a 9-month-old boy. Watson and Rayner conditioned "Little Albert" by clanging an iron rod when a white rat was presented. First, they presented to the boy a white rat and observed that he was not afraid of it. Second, they presented him with a white rat and then clanged an iron rod. "Little Albert" responded by crying. This second presentation was repeated several times. Finally, Watson and Rayner presented the white rat by itself and the boy showed fear. Later, in an attempt to see if the fear transferred to other objects, Watson presented this Albert with a rabbit, a dog, and a fur coat. He cried at the sight of all of them. This study demonstrated how emotions could become conditioned responses. As the story of "Little Albert" has made the rounds, inaccuracies and inconsistencies have crept in, some of them even due to Watson himself. Analyses of Watson's film footage of Albert suggest that the infant was mentally and developmentally disabled. An ethical problem of this study is that Watson and Rayner did not uncondition "Little Albert".

In 2009, Beck and Levinson found records of a child, Douglas Merritte, who seemed to have been Little Albert. They found that he had died from congenital hydrocephalus at the age of 6. Thus, it cannot be concluded to what extent this study had an effect on Little Albert's life. On January 25, 2012, Tom Bartlett of The Chronicle of Higher Education published a report that questions whether John Watson knew of cognitive abnormalities in Little Albert that would greatly skew the results of the experiment. In 2014, however, the journals that initially endorsed Beck and Fridlund's claims about Albert and Watson (the American Psychologist and History of Psychology) published articles debunking those claims.

=== Deconditioning ===
Because "Little Albert" was taken out of town, Watson did not have the time to decondition the child. This has ethical implications, but Watson did put in place a method for deconditioning fears. He worked with a colleague, Mary Cover Jones, on a set of procedures aimed at eliminating the fears of another little boy, Peter. Peter seemed to fear white rats and rabbits. Watson and Jones put Peter in his highchair and gave him a nice afternoon snack. At the same time a white rabbit in a cage was put in a distance that did not seem to disturb the child. The next day the rabbit was put slightly closer until Peter showed signs of slight disturbance. This treatment was repeated days after days until Peter could serenely eat his snack with the rabbit being right next to him. Peter was even able to play with the rabbit afterwards. This form of behavior modification is a technique today called systematic desensitization.

=== Limitations of the conditioning paradigm ===
The conditioning paradigm has certain limitations. Researchers have had a hard time conditioning infants that are just a few months old. This might be because they have not yet developed what Piaget calls "primary circular reactions". Because they cannot coordinate sensory motor actions they cannot learn to make different associations between their motoric behaviors and the environment. Another limitation concerns the kind of conditioned stimuli humans can learn. When researchers attempt to condition children to fear things such as curtains or wooden blocks they have had great difficulty. Humans may be "innately disposed to fear certain stimuli."

=== Psychological Care of Infant and Child (1928) ===
The 20th century marked the formation of qualitative distinctions between children and adults. In 1928, Watson wrote the book Psychological Care of Infant and Child with help from Rosalie Rayner, his assistant and wife. In it, Watson explains that behaviorists were starting to believe psychological care and analysis were required for infants and children. Watson advances the belief that children should be treated as young adults. As such, he warns against the dangers of a mother providing too much love and affection, because love—along with everything else understood by the behaviorist perspective— is conditioned. He contends that, since society does not overly comfort children as they become young adults in the real world, parents should not set up these unrealistic expectations. He disapproves of thumb sucking, masturbation and homosexuality, and encourages parents to be honest with their children about sex. He supports these views with the argument that "all of the weaknesses, reserves, fears, cautions, and inferiorities of our parents are stamped into us with sledgehammer blows," inferring that emotional disabilities are the result of personal treatment, not inheritance. He thus sets himself up on the side of nurture in the nature vs. nurture debate.

Watson's slogan was "not more babies, but better brought up babies"; he argued that the world would benefit from extinguishing pregnancies for 20 years while enough data was gathered to ensure an efficient child-rearing process. Watson argued that nothing is instinctual, but rather everything is built into a child through the interaction with their environment. Parents, therefore, hold complete responsibility as they choose what environment to allow their child to develop in.

Though he researched many topics throughout his career, child-rearing became Watson's strongest interest. His book was extremely popular, selling 100,000 copies within a few months of its release. Many critics were surprised to see his contemporaries come to accept his views. His emphasis on child development would influence some of his successors, though the field had already been delved into by psychologists prior to Watson. G. Stanley Hall, for instance, became well known for his 1904 book Adolescence. Hall's beliefs differed from Watson's behaviorism, as the former believed that one's behavior is mostly shaped by heredity and genetically predetermined factors, especially during childhood. His most famous concept, the 'Storm and Stress' theory, normalized adolescents' tendency to act out and experience mood swings.

Although he wrote extensively on child-rearing, including in Psychological Care of Infant and Child, as well as in many popular magazines, Watson later regretted altogether having written in the field, conceding that he "did not know enough" to do a good job.

==== Criticism ====
Critics argued that Watson's theories mainly stemmed from his pre-existing beliefs. How much Rosalie Rayner agreed with her husband's child-rearing ideas has also been an important question; she later wrote an article entitled "I am the Mother of a Behaviorist's Sons", in which she wrote about the future of their family.

R. Dale Nance worried that Watson's personal indiscretions and difficult upbringing could have affected his views. Suzanne Houk shared similar concerns while analyzing Watson's hope for a businesslike and casual relationship between a mother and her child. Houk points out that Watson only shifted his focus to child-rearing when he was fired from Johns Hopkins University due to his affair with Rayner. Laura E. Berk similarly examines the roots of the beliefs Watson came to honor, arguing that the Little Albert experiment inspired Watson's emphasis on environmental factors. Little Albert did not fear the rat and white rabbit until he was conditioned to do so. From this experiment, Watson concluded that parents can shape a child's behavior and development simply by controlling all the child's stimulus-response associations.

Watson's advice to treat children with respect but relative emotional detachment has been strongly criticized. This contention stems partly from Watsons' description of a 'happy child', who can only cry when in physical pain, occupies himself through his problem-solving abilities, and avoids asking questions. Other critics were more wary of Watson's relatively recent interest and success in child psychology.

=== "Twelve infants" ===
Watson has been misquoted with regard to the following passage, which is often presented out of context and with the last sentence omitted, making his position appear more radical than it actually was:

Give me a dozen healthy infants, well-formed, and my own specified world to bring them up in and I'll guarantee to take any one at random and train him to become any type of specialist I might select – doctor, lawyer, artist, merchant-chief and, yes, even beggar-man and thief, regardless of his talents, penchants, tendencies, abilities, vocations, and race of his ancestors. I am going beyond my facts and I admit it, but so have the advocates of the contrary and they have been doing it for many thousands of years.

— Behaviorism (2009) [1958], p. 82

In Watson's Behaviorism, the sentence is provided in the context of an extended argument against eugenics. That Watson did not hold a radical environmentalist position may be seen in his earlier writing in which his "starting point" for a science of behavior was "the observable fact that organisms, man and animal alike, do adjust themselves to their environment by means of hereditary and habit equipments." Nevertheless, Watson recognized the importance of nurture in the nature versus nurture discussion which was often neglected by his eugenic contemporaries.

== Advertising career ==
Thanks to contacts provided by E. B. Titchener, an academic colleague, Watson began working late in 1920 for the advertising agency J. Walter Thompson. He learned the advertising business from the ground level, including a stint working as a shoe salesman in an upscale department store. Despite this modest start, in less than two years Watson had risen to a vice-presidency at Thompson. His executive's salary, plus bonuses from various successful ad campaigns, resulted in an income many times higher than his academic salary. Watson headed a number of high-profile advertising campaigns, particularly for Ponds cold cream and other personal care products. In addition, he is credited with popularizing the coffee break through an ad campaign for Maxwell House coffee. He has been widely but erroneously credited with re-introducing the "testimonial" advertisement after the tool had fallen out of favor (due to its association with ineffective and dangerous patent medicines). However, testimonial advertisements had been in use for years before Watson entered advertising.

An example of Watson's use of testimonials was the campaign he developed for Pebeco Toothpaste. The ad featured a seductively dressed woman, and encouraged women to smoke as long as they used Pebeco toothpaste. The toothpaste was portrayed not as a means to health or hygiene, but as a way to heighten the sexual attraction of the consumer. Watson stated that he was not making original contributions, but was following normal practice in advertising. Watson stopped writing for popular audiences in 1936, and retired from advertising at about age 65.

== Selected works ==
- Watson, John B. (1907). "Kinæsthetic and organic sensations: Their role in the reactions of the white rat to the maze". The Psychological Review: Monograph Supplements. 8 (2): i–101. doi:10.1037/h0093040. ISSN 0096-9753.
- 1908. "The Behavior of Noddy and Sooty Terns."
- 1913. "Psychology as the Behaviorist Views It."
- Watson, John B. (John Broadus) (1919). Psychology from the standpoint of a behaviorist. Philadelphia Lippincott.
- 1920. "Conditioned emotional reactions," with Rosalie Rayner. — the Little Albert study.
- 1921. "Studies in Infant Psychology," with Rosalie Rayner.
- Watson, John B. (John Broadus) (1925). Behaviorism. New York : W. W. Norton. ISBN 978-0-393-00524-0.
- 1928. Psychological Care of Infant and Child.
- Watson, John B. (John Broadus) (1929). Behavior : an introduction to comparative psychology. New York : Holt.
- 1936. "John Broadus Watson." — autobiography
