= John Gabrieli =

American neuroscientist

- Citizenship: United States
- Education: Yale University; Massachusetts Institute of Technology
- Awards: Fellow of the Association for Psychological Science; Fellow of the American Association for the Advancement of Science (2008); Member of the American Academy of Arts and Sciences (2016)
- Scientific career
- Fields: Psychology, neuroscience
- Workplaces: Stanford University; Massachusetts General Hospital; Harvard Graduate School of Education; Massachusetts Institute of Technology
- Doctoral advisor: Suzanne Corkin

John Gabrieli is a neuroscientist at MIT, and an Investigator at the McGovern Institute for Brain Research. He is the Grover Hermann Professor of Health Sciences and Technology, a faculty member in the department of Brain and Cognitive Sciences and director of the Athinoula A. Martinos Imaging Center, part of the McGovern Institute. Gabrieli is an expert on the brain mechanisms of human cognition, including memory, thought and emotion. His work includes neuroimaging studies on healthy adults and children as well as clinical patients with many different brain disorders, including schizophrenia, depression, Alzheimer's disease, autism and dyslexia.

As a graduate student with Suzanne Corkin at MIT he carried out research with the famous HM, who was a globally amnesic patient as a result of epileptic surgery. Gabrieli was able to show the importance of the parahippocampal cortex in the formation of memories. In collaboration with Christopher deCharms and colleagues he was the first to demonstrate that human subjects could learn to control their own brain activity using real-time feedback from functional MRI.

One of his major current interests is dyslexia, in particular the use of brain imaging to identify children who are at risk for reading difficulties and to understand how reading instruction affects the brain.

In 2008 Gabrieli was elected as a fellow of the American Association for the Advancement of Science, which cited his "penetrating analyses of the nature of human memory, its neural substrates, its development, and its problems."
