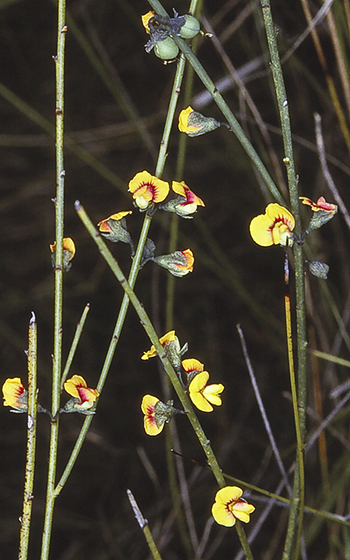
- In Morton National Park

Scientific classification
- Kingdom: Plantae
- Clade: Tracheophytes
- Clade: Angiosperms
- Clade: Eudicots
- Clade: Rosids
- Order: Fabales
- Family: Fabaceae
- Subfamily: Faboideae
- Genus: Sphaerolobium
- Species: S. vimineum

Binomial name
- Sphaerolobium vimineum Sm.

= Sphaerolobium vimineum =

Species of flowering plant

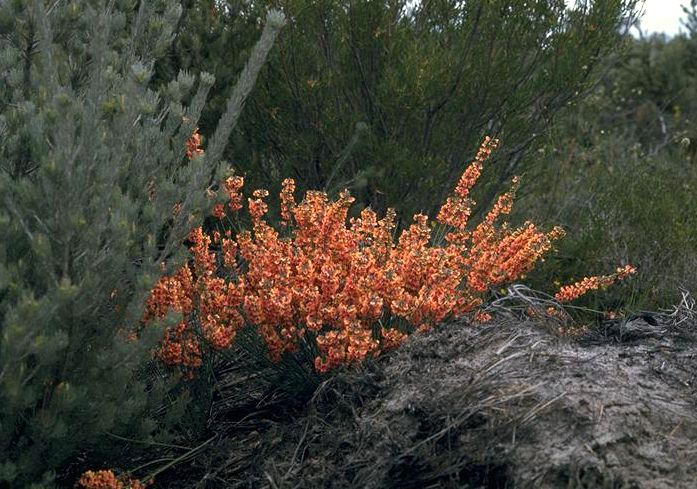
Habit near Mogumber

Sphaerolobium vimineum, commonly known as leafless globe-pea, is a species of flowering plant in the family Fabaceae and is endemic to Australia. It is an erect, rush-like, mostly leafless shrub with yellow and reddish flowers arranged in small groups along the stems.

== Description ==
Sphaerolobium vimineum is an erect, rush-like shrub that typically grows to a height of 0.3–1.2 m (1 ft 0 in – 3 ft 11 in) and is more or less leafless. The leaves, when present, are linear to lance-shaped and up to 8 mm (0.31 in) long. The flowers are arranged in groups of 2 or 3 along the branches on a peduncle up to about 0.5 mm (0.020 in) long, each flower on a pedicel 1–3 mm (0.039–0.118 in) long with egg-shaped bracts, and bracteoles 1.5–3 mm (0.059–0.118 in) long at the base of the sepals. The sepals are green with dark grey spots, 3–4 mm (0.12–0.16 in) long and joined at the base, with overlapping lobes, the two upper lobes forming a wedge-shaped "lip". The standard petal is elliptic, 5–6 mm (0.20–0.24 in) long and yellow with a red base, the wings longer than the keel. Flowering occurs from September to December and the fruit is a spherical pod 3–5 mm (0.12–0.20 in) in diameter.

Sphaerolobium minus is a similar species but has uniformly grey sepals, the wings about the same length as the keel and the wings much longer than broad.

== Taxonomy and naming ==
Sphaerolobium vimineum was first formally described in 1805 by James Edward Smith in the Annals of Botany. The specific epithet (vimineum) means "having long, flexible twigs or shoots".

== Distribution and habitat ==
Leafless globe-pea usually grows in heath and forest from south-east Queensland, along the coast and tablelands of New South Wales, through the higher rainfall parts of southern Victoria, west to the far south-east of South Australia, and south to Tasmania. It is also widespread in the Esperance Plains, Jarrah Forest, Swan Coastal Plain and Warren bioregions of south-western Western Australia.
