= Ripe =

Ripe or RIPE may refer to:

== Horticulture ==
- Ripening, the maturation process of fruit
- Ripeness in viticulture, the completion of the ripening process of wine grapes

== Acronyms ==
- RIPE, Réseaux IP Européens
- RIPE NCC, the Regional Internet Registry (RIR) for Europe
- RIPEMD, a family of cryptographic hash functions
- Realizing Increased Photosynthetic Efficiency, a genetic engineering research project

== Arts and entertainment ==
- Ripe (1996 film), an American drama film by Mo Ogrodnik
- Ripe (2025 film), a Canadian short film by Solara Thanh Bình Đặng
- Ripe (Banderas album), 1991
- Ripe (Ben Lee album) or the title song, 2007
- Ripe (Field Trip album), 1991
- Ripe (Slug album), 2015
- Ripe (Australian band), an Australian band formed in 1988
- Ripe (American band), an American band established in 2011
- Ripe Digital Entertainment, a defunct American video-on-demand provider

== Places ==
- Ripe, East Sussex, England
- Ripe, Marche, Italy

== Other uses ==
- Ripeness, a term in law
- Wilhelm Ripe (1818–1885), German painter

== See also ==
- Cervical ripening, the softening of the cervix prior to the onset of labor
- Ripen (album), by Shawn McDonald, 2006
