= Sapna Sharma =

Canadian biologist

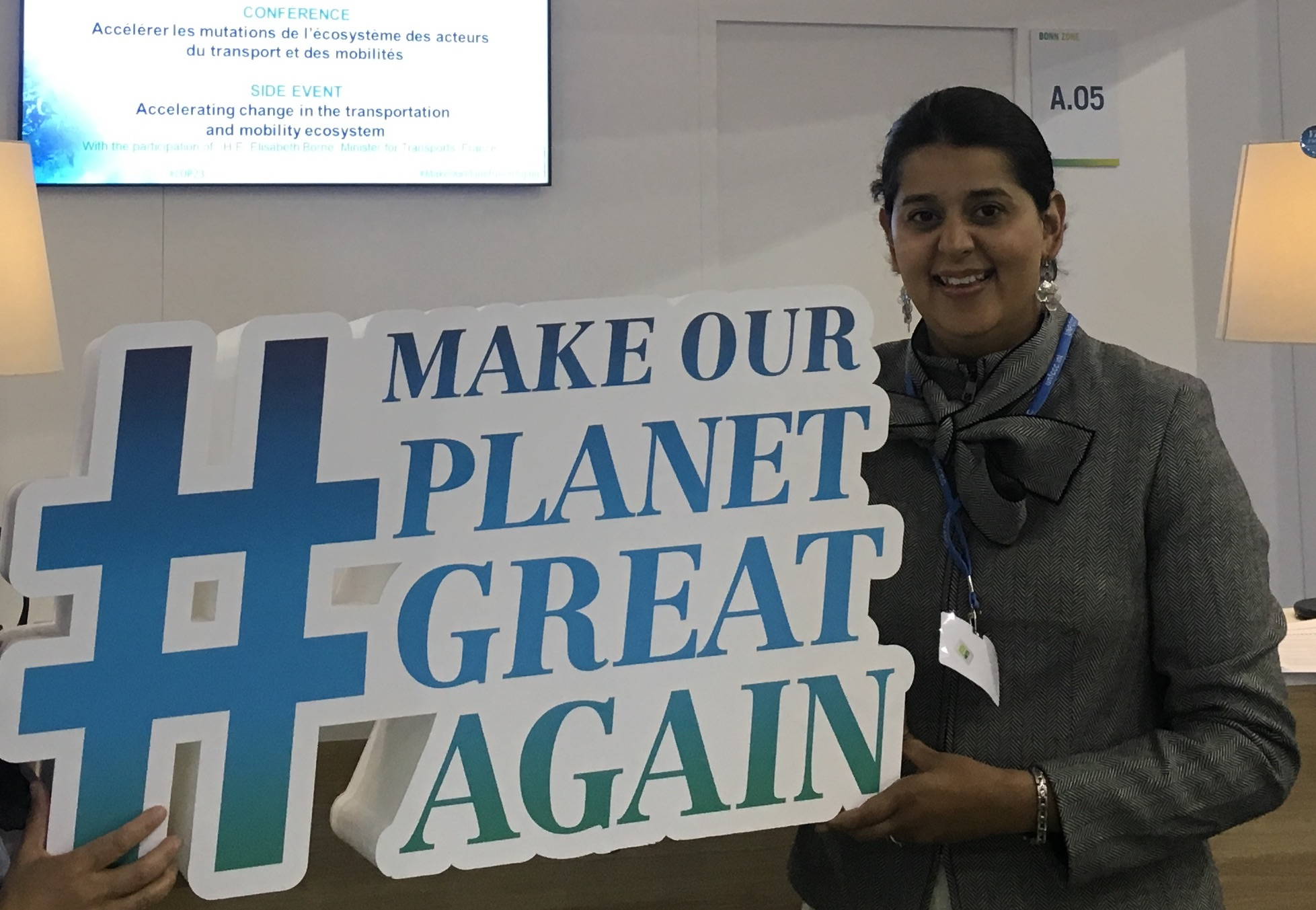
- Sapna Sharma in 2017
- Education: PhD., University of Toronto
- Scientific career
- Institutions: York University
- Thesis: The effects of climate change on the northward range expansion of smallmouth bass (Micropterus dolomieu) and the consequential impacts on native fish populations (2007)
- Website: sharmalab.wordpress.com

Sapna Sharma is a Canadian limnologist and associate professor of biology at York University. Sharma studies human-induced environmental stressors and holds the York University Research Chair in Global Change Biology. She also holds the position of inaugural Director of the UNITAR (United Nations Institute for Training and Research) Global Water Academy. She obtained her PhD at the University of Toronto and held post-doctoral fellowships at the University of Montreal and the Center for Limnology at the University of Wisconsin–Madison.

As of 2021, Sharma is a recipient of the Provostial Fellowship at York University. Sharma's project, "Working Towards Equitable Access to Clean Water", will combine student and staff efforts in raising awareness and identifying solutions to poor access to clean water around the world.

== Research ==
Sharma's research takes interdisciplinary, team science, Citizen Science, and data synthesis approaches to examine and predict the effects of environmental stressors on ecosystems. She has led the assembly, integration and analysis of large, long-term aquatic datasets that enable meta-analysis on a global scale. This approach has revealed how climate change is producing abiotic and biotic seasonal changes (phenology). Sharma's research group also examines how to improve the quantitative approaches used to generate these predictions.

Sharma's research on climate change and global warming has examined shrinking ice cover of freshwater lakes, and how fish distributions will be affected by a warming climate. The relation of ice cover loss to its impact on recreational ice skating in northern countries such as Canada, the United States, Sweden and Norway was widely covered in international media, as well as local news outlets in communities directly impacted by her research. Her work on the impact to freshwater fisheries projected that in Ontario alone climate change would impact the trout fishery in over 1,600 lakes by 2050, and 9,700 by 2100. Sharma designed the curriculum for a seven-week course titled "Introduction to Big Data for Water Sustainability," run by the United Nations Institute for Training & Research (UNITAR) Global Water Academy and pioneered by York University, focused on harnessing the power of open-access data, novel technologies, inclusive international collaborations and Indigenous knowledge integration to provide a comprehensive understanding of water sustainability on a global scale.

== Selected bibliography ==
- Knoll, Lesley; Sharma, Sapna; Denfeld, Blaize A.; Flaim, Giovanna; Hori, Yukari; Magnuson, John J.; Straile, Dietmar; Weyhenmeyer, Gesa A. (9 May 2019). "Data for Warmer Winters and Ice-Based Cultural Ecosystem Services: Empirical Evidence from USA, Canada, Japan, Germany, Austria, Switzerland, and Sweden". Data Repository for the University of Minnesota (DRUM). doi:10.13020/3j5g-kc72. hdl:11299/202813.
- Frassl, Marieke A.; Hamilton, David P.; Denfeld, Blaize A.; de Eyto, Elvira; Hampton, Stephanie E.; Keller, Philipp S.; Sharma, Sapna; Lewis, Abigail S. L.; Weyhenmeyer, Gesa A.; O'Reilly, Catherine M.; Lofton, Mary E.; Catalán, Núria; Lewitter, Fran (15 November 2018). "Ten simple rules for collaboratively writing a multi-authored paper". PLOS Computational Biology. 14 (11) e1006508. Bibcode:2018PLSCB..14E6508F. doi:10.1371/journal.pcbi.1006508. PMC 6237291. PMID 30439938.
- Sharma, Sapna; Blagrave, Kevin; Magnuson, John J.; O'Reilly, Catherine M.; Oliver, Samantha; Batt, Ryan; Magee, Madeline; Straile, Dietmar; Weyhenmeyer, Gesa; Winslow, Luke; Woolway, R. Iestyn (2018). "Widespread loss of lake ice around the Northern Hemisphere in a warming world". Environmental Data Initiative. doi:10.6073/pasta/df1b8d092f86b71648e20a64de6c62d2.
- Richardson, David; Melles, Stephanie; Pilla, Rachel; Hetherington, Amy; Knoll, Lesley; Williamson, Craig; Kraemer, Benjamin; Jackson, James; Long, Elizabeth; Moore, Karen; Rudstam, Lars; Rusak, James; Saros, Jasmine; Sharma, Sapna; Strock, Kristin; Weathers, Kathleen; Wigdahl-Perry, Courtney (20 June 2017). "Transparency, Geomorphology and Mixing Regime Explain Variability in Trends in Lake Temperature and Stratification across Northeastern North America (1975–2014)". Water. 9 (6): 442. doi:10.3390/w9060442. hdl:10919/79335.
