= Sphaerolobium calcicola =

Conservation status
- Priority Three — Poorly Known Taxa (DEC)

Scientific classification
- Kingdom: Plantae
- Clade: Tracheophytes
- Clade: Angiosperms
- Clade: Eudicots
- Clade: Rosids
- Order: Fabales
- Family: Fabaceae
- Subfamily: Faboideae
- Genus: Sphaerolobium
- Species: S. calcicola

Binomial name
- Sphaerolobium calcicola R.Butcher

Species of flowering plant

Sphaerolobium calcicola is a species of flowering plant in the family Fabaceae and is endemic to the south-west of Western Australia. It is a slender, erect or climbing shrub with orange-red flowers from September to November.

It was first formally described in 2004 by Ryonen Butcher in Australian Systematic Botany from specimens collected in Yalgorup National Park in 1997. The specific epithet (calcicola) means "limestone-dweller".

Sphaerolobium calcicola grows on sand dunes, winter-wet places and swamps near the coast in the Swan Coastal Plain bioregion of south-western Western Australia. It is listed as "Priority Three" by the Government of Western Australia Department of Biodiversity, Conservation and Attractions, meaning that it is poorly known and known from only a few locations but is not under imminent threat.
