= Stephen P. Long =

British plant physiologist (1950–2025)

Stephen Long FRS
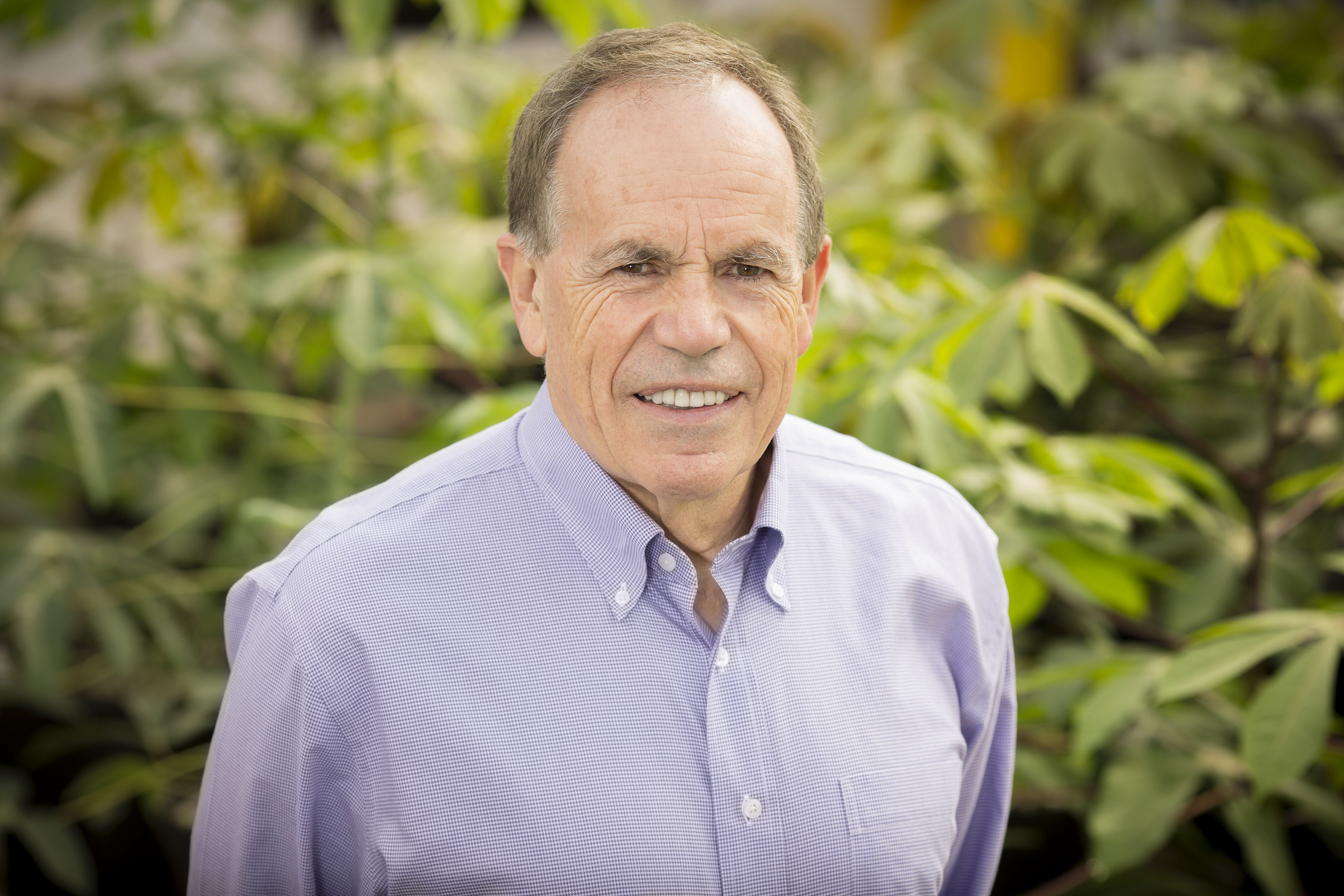
- Born: Stephen Patrick Long; 13 August 1950; London, England
- Died: 9 September 2025 (aged 75)
- Citizenship: United States
- Education: University of Reading (BSc); University of Leeds (PhD); University of Lancaster (D.Sc.)
- Spouse: Ann Long
- Children: 2
- Awards: Member of the National Academy of Sciences (2019)
- Scientific career
- Fields: Plant science; Plant physiology; Photosynthesis
- Workplaces: University of Illinois; Lancaster University; University of Oxford
- Thesis: C4 photosynthesis in cool temperate climates, with reference to Spartina townsendii (S.L.) in Britain (1976)
- Doctoral advisor: Dr. H.W. Woolhouse
- Doctoral students: Lisa Ainsworth
- Website: https://lab.igb.illinois.edu/long/team/long

Stephen Patrick Long FRS (13 August 1950 – 9 September 2025) was a British-born American environmental plant physiologist and member of the National Academy of Sciences studying how to improve photosynthesis to increase the yield of food and biofuel crops. He was the Stanley O. Ikenberry Chair Professor of Plant Biology and Crop Sciences at the University of Illinois and visiting professor in Plant Sciences at Lancaster University and at Oxford University, UK. His work, published in Science, proved that photosynthesis can be manipulated to increase plant productivity—an idea once considered the holy grail of plant biology. Long has added to our understanding of the long-term impacts of climate change, such as rising levels of carbon dioxide and ozone on plants. He has briefed former president George W. Bush and the Vatican, as well as Bill Gates and Anne, Princess Royal, on food security and bioenergy.

== Early life and education ==
Long was born and raised in London, England. His high school biology teacher inspired him to study plants—and famines in the 1960s encouraged him to find avenues to increase agricultural productivity. Long earned his bachelor's degree in agricultural botany from Reading University in 1972 and went on to earn a doctorate in plant environmental physiology from Leeds University in 1976. In 2007, Lancaster University honored Long's environmental research contributions with a doctorate of environmental science honoris causa.

== Career and research ==
Long joined the faculty as a lecturer at the University of Essex in 1975 and went on to become a senior lecturer (1987) and reader (1988); he obtained full professorship in 1990. In 1999, he moved to the University of Illinois and was named the Robert Emerson Professor of Plant Biology and of Crop Sciences (1999–2008). Over his career, Long has worked at Tate & Lyle Ltd. Research Centre, the Smithsonian Institution (1989), the University of Vienna (1989–1990), and Brookhaven National Laboratory (1992–1999). In 2007, as the founding deputy director, Long helped launch the Energy Biosciences Institute (EBI), a 10-year, $500 million research project that was then the largest public-private partnership between the University of California at Berkeley, University of Illinois at Urbana-Champaign, Lawrence Berkeley National Laboratory, and the energy company BP. In 2008, he was named the Edward William and Jane Marr Gutgsell Endowed University Professor of Crop Sciences and Plant Biology. From 2010 to 2016, he also served as a Special U.S. Government Employee (SGE) advising for the biomass programs for the United States Department of Energy and United States Department of Agriculture.

In 2012, Long stepped down from leading the EBI to direct Realizing Increased Photosynthetic Efficiency (RIPE), a $25-million-dollar research project funded by the Bill & Melinda Gates Foundation to engineer plants to photosynthesize more efficiently in order to sustainably increase worldwide food productivity. In 2017, the RIPE project received a $45 million reinvestment from the Gates Foundation, Foundation for Food and Agriculture Research (FFAR) and the UK Department for International Development. Long has also served as the director of two ARPA-E-funded projects: Plants Engineered to Replace Oil in Sugarcane and Sweet Sorghum (PETROSS), 2013–2018 and Transportation Energy Resource from Renewable Agriculture – Mobile Energy-Crop Phenotyping Platform (TERRA-MEPP), 2015–2019. He has also served as the deputy director of a third ARPA-E-funded project, Water Efficient Sorghum Technologies (WEST), 2016–2019. In 2013, he was "selected from the faculty on the basis of their outstanding scholarship" and appointed as a Center for Advanced Studies (CAS) Professor at Illinois. In 2014, he joined the faculty of the Carl R. Woese Institute for Genomic Biology, an interdisciplinary life sciences research institute at Illinois. In 2016, he became the Distinguished Professor in Crop Sciences FRS at Lancaster University. From 2017 to 2018, he served as the Newton Abraham visiting professor of Oxford University. In 2018, he was amongst four Illinois faculty members selected for an Ikenberry Endowed Chair that is "deemed to be among the most distinguished honors on the campus". In 2019, he was elected to the National Academy of Sciences.

In addition, Long was the founding and chief editor of Global Change Biology. He also founded GCB Bioenergy, the most highly cited bioenergy journal and second most highly cited agronomy journal. In 2018, he launched a new journal in silico Plants (isP) through the Oxford University Press that will publish cross-disciplinary research at the interface between plant biology, mathematics and computer science.

He was a member of the editorial board for PNAS.

Long was the author of more than 400 scientific publications, including more than 250 peer-reviewed articles in journals such as Nature and Science. Of particular note, he discovered the most productive land plant known Echinochloa polystachya) and identified Miscanthus as a productive temperate plant, transforming it into a viable bioenergy crop in Europe and North America. He also developed the "first dynamic model of the complete photosynthetic process." Recent work by Long has centered on how to engineer plants to photosynthesize more efficiently to increase yields of food and bioenergy crops. Long was instrumental in the development of SoyFACE, the largest open-air laboratory in the word to evaluate the impact of future climatic conditions on crops. In 2016, he proved that yield could be increased by computer-designed engineering; the results were published in Science, covered by the New York Times, and named one of the top scientific moments of 2016 by the Guardian. Long led the team that engineered a crop that needs 25 percent less water—without compromising yield—by altering the expression of one gene that is found in all plants, as reported in Nature Communications.

== Death ==
Long died on 9 September 2025, after being diagnosed with pancreatic cancer 18 months prior. He was 75.

== Awards and honours ==
In 1972, Long received the University Prize from the University of Reading. From 1972 to 1975, he served as a University Scholar at the University of Leeds. He was a recipient of the Andrew Mellon Foundation personal award (1998–2003) and the McNair Movement Award (2005). He has been recognized by Clarivate Analytics (formerly Thomson Reuters) as a highly cited researcher in the field of plant and animal science every year since 2005. In 2007, the American Association for the Advancement of Science elected Long as a fellow. He was also chosen to be the G.E. Blackman Lecturer at the University of Oxford and the Porter Alliance Lecturer at Imperial College London in 2007. In 2008, he was named the Heilborn Lecturer at Northwestern University; the CMI Lecturer at Princeton University; the Industry Summer School Lecturer at Massachusetts Institute of Technology; the 9th Annual Woolhouse Lecturer for the Society for Experimental Biology; and Holden Botany Lecturer at Sutton Bonington Campus in 2008. In 2009, he was named a Fellow of the American Society of Plant Biologists. In 2010, he served as the BEGC Lecturer at Harvard University. In 2012, he served as an Invited Expert on Food Security for the President's Council of Advisors on Science Technology (PCAST). In 2012, he was also honored with the Charles F. Kettering Award for Excellence in Photosynthesis Research from the American Society of Plant Biologists and the Marsh Award for Climate Change Research from the British Ecological Society. Also in 2012, he became an Elected Fellow of Rothamsted Research, appointed to advise the director of the world's oldest agricultural experimental research station. In 2013, he served as the CeBiTec Annual Distinguished Lecturer at the Centrum für Biotechnologie and the 4th Annual Riley Memorial Lecturer for the World Food Prize and American Association for the Advancement of Science. He also received the Innovation Award from the International Society for Photosynthesis Research. In 2013, Long was elected a Fellow of the Royal Society (FRS), the oldest continually operating society that honors leading scientists and engineers. In 2016, he became an Elected Fellow of Lincoln College at the University of Oxford. Long has also been named as one of "The World’s Most Influential Scientific Minds" by Thomson Reuters.
