= AoB Plants =

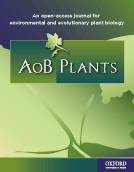
- Discipline: Botany, environmental biology
- Language: English
- Edited by: Tom Buckley

Publication details
- History: 2009–present
- Publisher: Oxford University Press on behalf of the Annals of Botany Company
- Frequency: Upon acceptance
- Open access: Yes
- License: Creative Commons Attribution License 4.0
- Impact factor: 2.9 (2022)

Standard abbreviations
- ISO 4: AoB Plants

Indexing
- CODEN: APOLD9
- ISSN: 2041-2851
- OCLC no.: 495838677

Links
- Journal homepage; Online archive

AoB Plants (AoBP) is a peer-reviewed open-access, non-profit scientific journal established in 2009 and publishing on all aspects of plant biology. The editor-in-chief is Tom Buckley (University of California, Davis) and the journal is published through Oxford University Press but owned and managed by the Annals of Botany Company a non-profit educational charity registered with the Charity Commission for England and Wales. AoBP was one of the first plant science journals to adopt a fully open access publishing model. AoBP is one of few plant science journals that use double-blind peer review (neither authors nor reviewers know one another's identities); its "sound-science ethos and mission" statement reads, "The mission of AoBP is to provide an outlet for plant-focused research without the biases that affect much of scientific publishing. These biases include the devaluing of confirmatory or negative results and prejudices against authors based on their personal characteristics (such as gender, ethnicity, affiliation, seniority and reputation). Thus, we base decisions to accept or reject papers solely on rigor, clarity and substance, and we use double-blind peer review, concealing the identities of authors and reviewers during the review process. We prefer to leave judgments about the wider importance of papers to the scientific community." An account of the thinking behind launching the journal and its progress over the first 10 years has been published. AoB Plants has two sister journals, Annals of Botany, a subscription-based general botanical journal and in silico Plants, an open access journal devoted to all aspects of plant modelling.

== Abstracting and indexing ==
The journal is abstracted and indexed in:

- AGRICOLA
- Biological Abstracts
- BIOSIS Previews
- CAB International
- Chemical Abstracts Service
- Current Contents/Agriculture, Biology & Environmental Sciences
- Food Science and Technology Abstracts
- Science Citation Index Expanded
- Scopus

According to Journal Citation Reports, the journal has a 2022 impact factor of 2.9.
