= Sphaerolobium fornicatum =

Scientific classification
- Kingdom: Plantae
- Clade: Tracheophytes
- Clade: Angiosperms
- Clade: Eudicots
- Clade: Rosids
- Order: Fabales
- Family: Fabaceae
- Subfamily: Faboideae
- Genus: Sphaerolobium
- Species: S. fornicatum

Binomial name
- Sphaerolobium fornicatum Benth.

Species of flowering plant

Sphaerolobium fornicatum is a species of flowering plant in the family Fabaceae and is endemic to the far south-west of Western Australia. It is a leafless shrub that typically grows to a height of 0.1–1 m (3.9 in – 3 ft 3.4 in) and has yellow or orange and red flowers from October to January.

It was first formally described in 1837 by George Bentham in Stephan Endlicher's Enumeratio plantarum quas in Novae Hollandiae ora austro-occidentali ad fluvium Cygnorum et in sinu Regis Georgii collegit Carolus Liber Baro de Hügel from specimens collected near King George Sound. The specific epithet (fornicatum) means "arched", referring to the curved keel.

Sphaerolobium fornicatum occurs in the Jarrah Forest and Warren bioregions of far south-western Western Australia and is listed as "not threatened" by the Government of Western Australia Department of Biodiversity, Conservation and Attractions.
