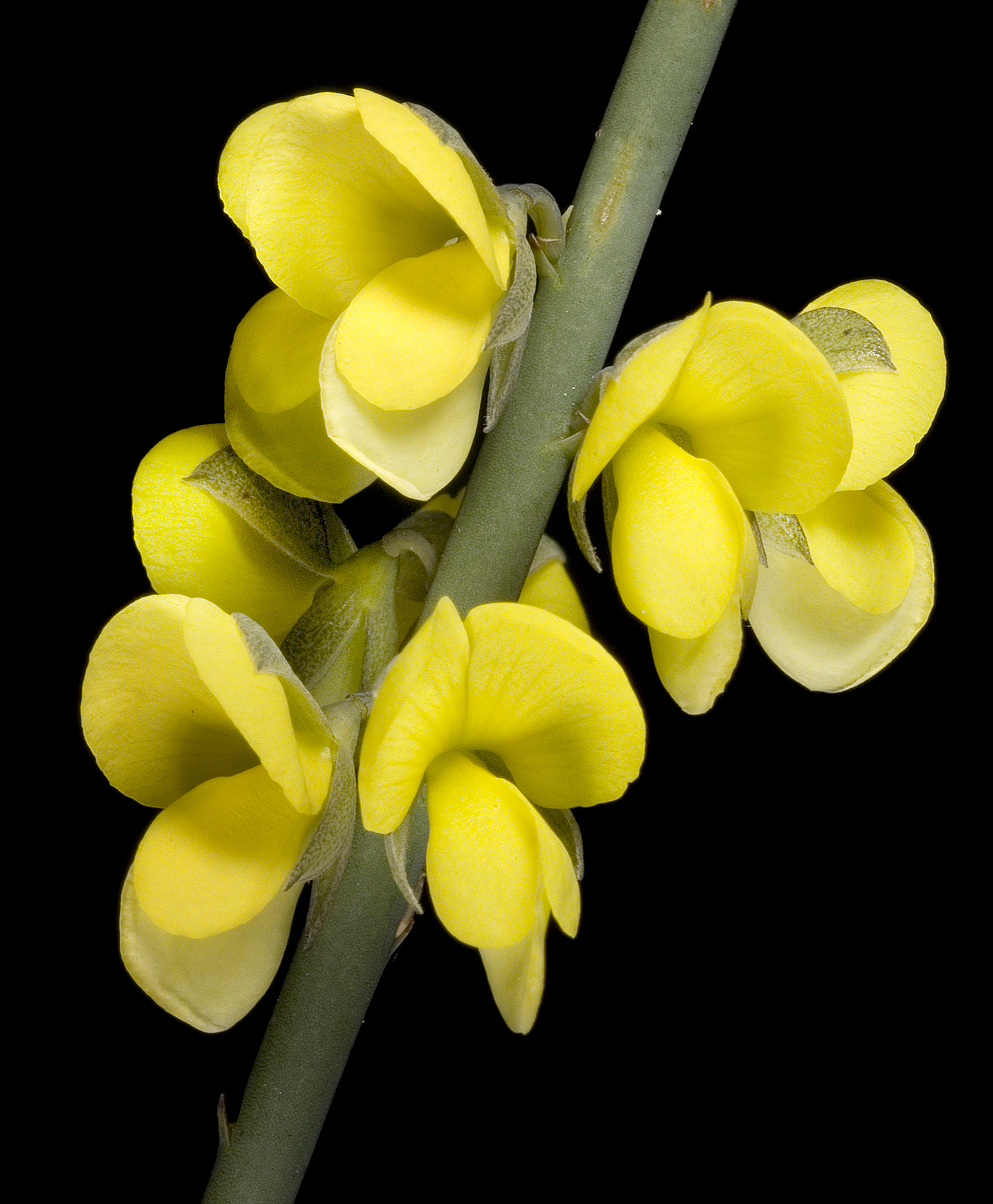

Scientific classification
- Kingdom: Plantae
- Clade: Tracheophytes
- Clade: Angiosperms
- Clade: Eudicots
- Clade: Rosids
- Order: Fabales
- Family: Fabaceae
- Subfamily: Faboideae
- Genus: Sphaerolobium
- Species: S. macranthum

Binomial name
- Sphaerolobium macranthum Meisn.

Synonyms
- Sphaerolobium macranthum Meisn. var. macranthum

= Sphaerolobium macranthum =

Species of flowering plant

Sphaerolobium macranthum is a species of flowering plant in the family Fabaceae and is endemic to the south-west of Western Australia. It is an erect shrub with only a few scale-like leaves, and yellow or orange and red flowers.

== Description ==
Sphaerolobium macranthum is an erect shrub that typically grows to a height of 25–80 cm (9.8–31.5 in) and has thick, rigid sometimes spiny stems. The leaves are reduced to a few small scales, sometimes in whorls around the stem. The flowers are yellow or orange and red, arranged in clusters, the sepals about 4 mm (0.16 in) long and joined for about half their length. The standard petal is broad and longer than the other petals and the keel is broad, and rounded at the top. Flowering occurs in September and October and the fruit is a pod that is wider than long.

== Taxonomy ==
Sphaerolobium macranthum was first formally described in 1848 by Carl Meissner in Lehmann's Plantae Preissianae. The specific epithet (macranthum) means "large-flowered".

== Distribution and habitat ==
Sphaerolobium macranthum grows in sandy soils in near-coastal areas of the Avon Wheatbelt, Esperance Plains, Geraldton Sandplains, Jarrah Forest, Swan Coastal Plain and Warren bioregions of south-western Western Australia and is listed as "not threatened" by the Government of Western Australia Department of Biodiversity, Conservation and Attractions.
