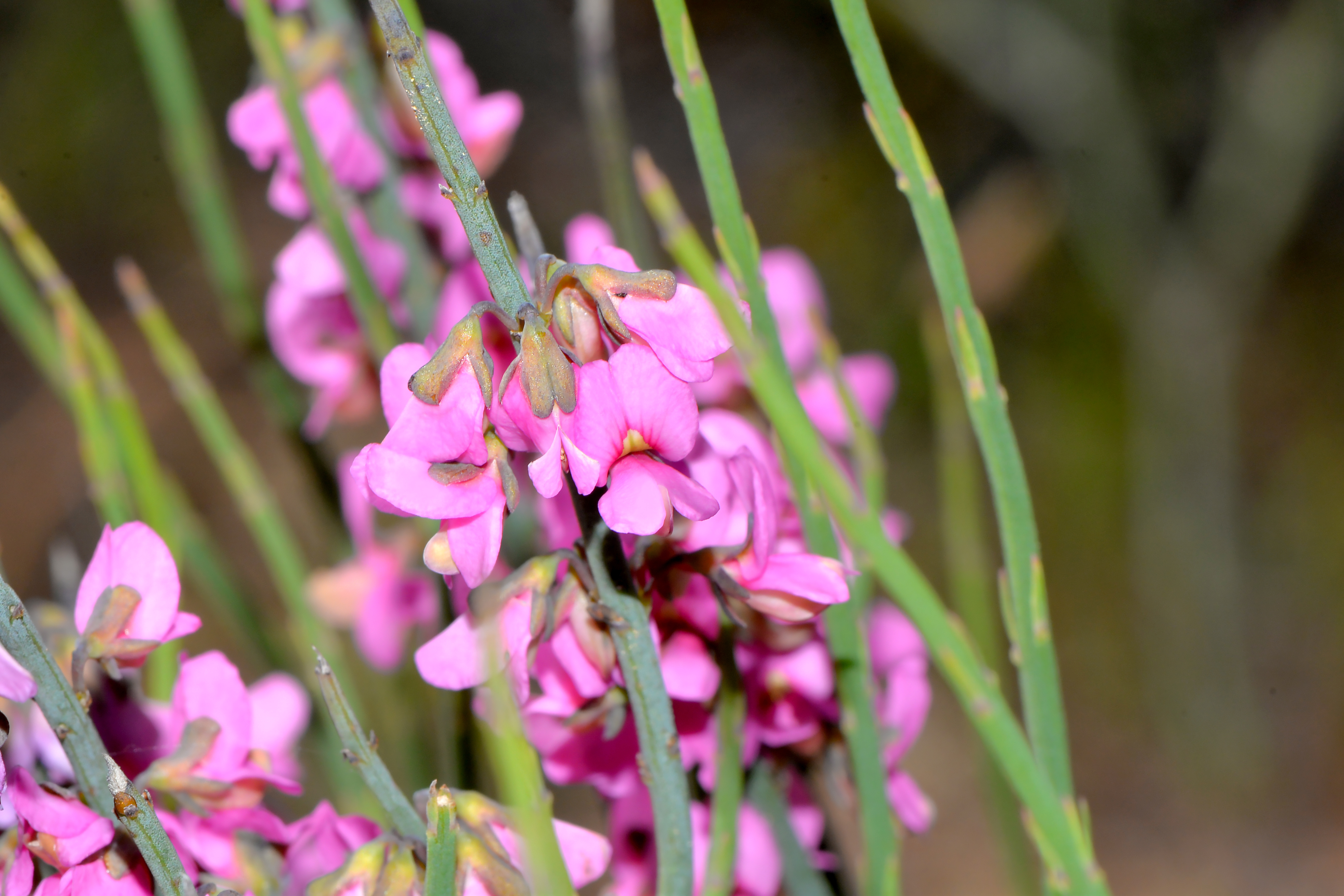

Conservation status
- Near Threatened (IUCN 3.1)

Scientific classification
- Kingdom: Plantae
- Clade: Tracheophytes
- Clade: Angiosperms
- Clade: Eudicots
- Clade: Rosids
- Order: Fabales
- Family: Fabaceae
- Subfamily: Faboideae
- Genus: Sphaerolobium
- Species: S. pulchellum

Binomial name
- Sphaerolobium pulchellum Meisn.

Synonyms
- Sphaerolobium macranthum var. pulchellum (Meisn.) Benth.

= Sphaerolobium pulchellum =

Species of plant

Sphaerolobium pulchellum is a species of flowering plant in the family Fabaceae and is endemic to the south-west of Western Australia. It is a more or less leafless shrub that typically grow to a height of 10–30 mm (0.39–1.18 in) and has pink or purple and yellow flowers in September and October.

Sphaerolobium pulchellum was first formally described in 1855 by Carl Meissner in the journal Botanische Zeitung from specimens collected by James Drummond. The specific epithet (pulchellum) means "beautiful and small".

This grows in sand and gravel on plains in the Geraldton Sandplains and Swan Coastal Plain bioregions of south-western Western Australia and is listed as "not threatened" by the Government of Western Australia Department of Biodiversity, Conservation and Attractions.
