= Sphaerolobium benetectum =

Conservation status
- Priority Two — Poorly Known Taxa (DEC)

Scientific classification
- Kingdom: Plantae
- Clade: Tracheophytes
- Clade: Angiosperms
- Clade: Eudicots
- Clade: Rosids
- Order: Fabales
- Family: Fabaceae
- Subfamily: Faboideae
- Genus: Sphaerolobium
- Species: S. benetectum

Binomial name
- Sphaerolobium benetectum R.Butcher

Species of flowering plant

Sphaerolobium benetectum is a species of flowering plant in the family Fabaceae and is endemic to the south-west of Western Australia. It is tuft-forming sub-shrub with erect stems, linear to lance-shaped leaves, and yellow-orange and pink to red flowers.

== Description ==
Sphaerolobium benetectum is a tuft-forming sub-shrub that typically grows to 0.3–1 m (1 ft 0 in – 3 ft 3 in) high and 45 cm (18 in) wide and has slender, erect stems. Its leaves are linear to lance-shaped, 3.0–3.5 mm (0.12–0.14 in) long and 0.3–0.5 mm (0.012–0.020 in) wide but that fall off before flowering. The flowers are arranged in pairs along 50–200 mm (2.0–7.9 in) of the leafless stems with ten to one hundred flowers, each flower on a pedicel 1.0–1.5 mm (0.039–0.059 in) long. The sepals are 3.5–4.0 mm (0.14–0.16 in) long, fused for half their length to form a top-shaped base, the upper two lobes fused for most of their length and the lower three 2.1–2.6 mm (0.083–0.102 in) long. The standard petal is egg-shaped, 5.1–6.3 mm (0.20–0.25 in) long, 4.7–5.1 mm (0.19–0.20 in) wide, orange-yellow and red. The wings are 5.0–5.5 mm (0.20–0.22 in) long and pinkish-red, the keel 5.6–6.2 mm (0.22–0.24 in) long and yellow and red. Flowering occurs in October and November and the fruit is more or less flattened round pod about 2.7 mm (0.11 in) long.

== Taxonomy and naming ==
Sphaerolobium benetectum was first formally described in 2001 by Ryonen Butcher in the journal Nuytsia from specimens collected near Collie in 1999. The specific epithet (benetectum) means "well hidden" referring to the difficulty of detecting the species.

== Distribution and habitat ==
This species grows in winter-wet areas near swamps and in low shrubland in three disjunct areas, near Collie, near Augusta and near Mount Lindesay.

== Conservation status ==
Sphaerolobium benetectum is listed as "Priority Two" by the Western Australian Government Department of Biodiversity, Conservation and Attractions, meaning that it is poorly known and from only one or a few locations.
