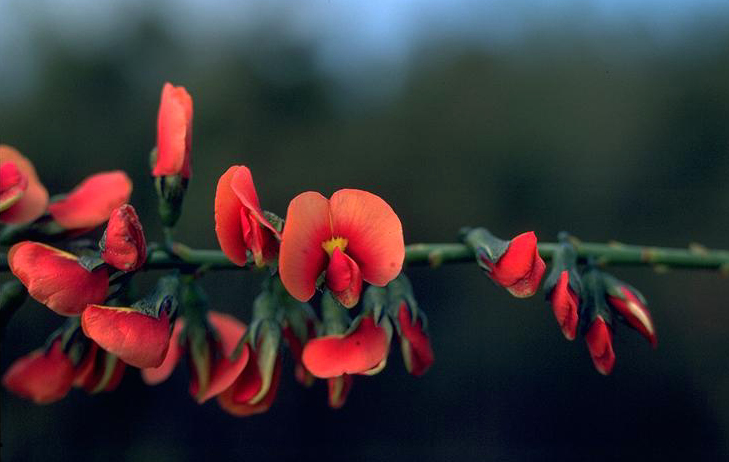
- Near Albany

Scientific classification
- Kingdom: Plantae
- Clade: Tracheophytes
- Clade: Angiosperms
- Clade: Eudicots
- Clade: Rosids
- Order: Fabales
- Family: Fabaceae
- Subfamily: Faboideae
- Genus: Sphaerolobium
- Species: S. grandiflorum

Binomial name
- Sphaerolobium grandiflorum Benth.

= Sphaerolobium grandiflorum =

Species of flowering plant

Sphaerolobium grandiflorum is a species of flowering plant in the family Fabaceae and is endemic to the south of Western Australia. It is an erect, slender, leafless shrub with red, yellow and orange flowers.

== Description ==
Sphaerolobium grandiflorum is an erect, slender shrub that typically grows to a height of 0.3–1 m (1 ft 0 in – 3 ft 3 in) and is leafless. The flowers are usually arranged in pairs in leaf axils with scale-like bracts at the base. The sepals are about 6.5 mm (0.26 in) long and joined at the base for half their length. The flowers are red, yellow and orange, the standard petal broad, about twice as long as the sepals, and deeply notched, the wings much shorter than the standard and the keel longer than the wings. Flowering occurs from September to November and the fruit is a pod that is slightly broader than long.

== Taxonomy ==
Sphaerolobium grandiflorum was first formally described in 1837 by George Bentham in Stephan Endlicher's Enumeratio plantarum quas in Novae Hollandiae ora austro-occidentali ad fluvium Cygnorum et in sinu Regis Georgii collegit Carolus Liber Baro de Hügel from specimens collected near King Georges Sound. The specific epithet (grandiflorum) means "large-flowered".

== Distribution and habitat ==
Sphaerolobium grandiflorum grows in winter-wet areas and swamps in the Esperance Plains, Jarrah Forest and Warren bioregions of southern Western Australia and is listed as "not threatened" by the Government of Western Australia Department of Biodiversity, Conservation and Attractions.
