= Realizing Increased Photosynthetic Efficiency =

Realizing Increased Photosynthetic Efficiency (RIPE)
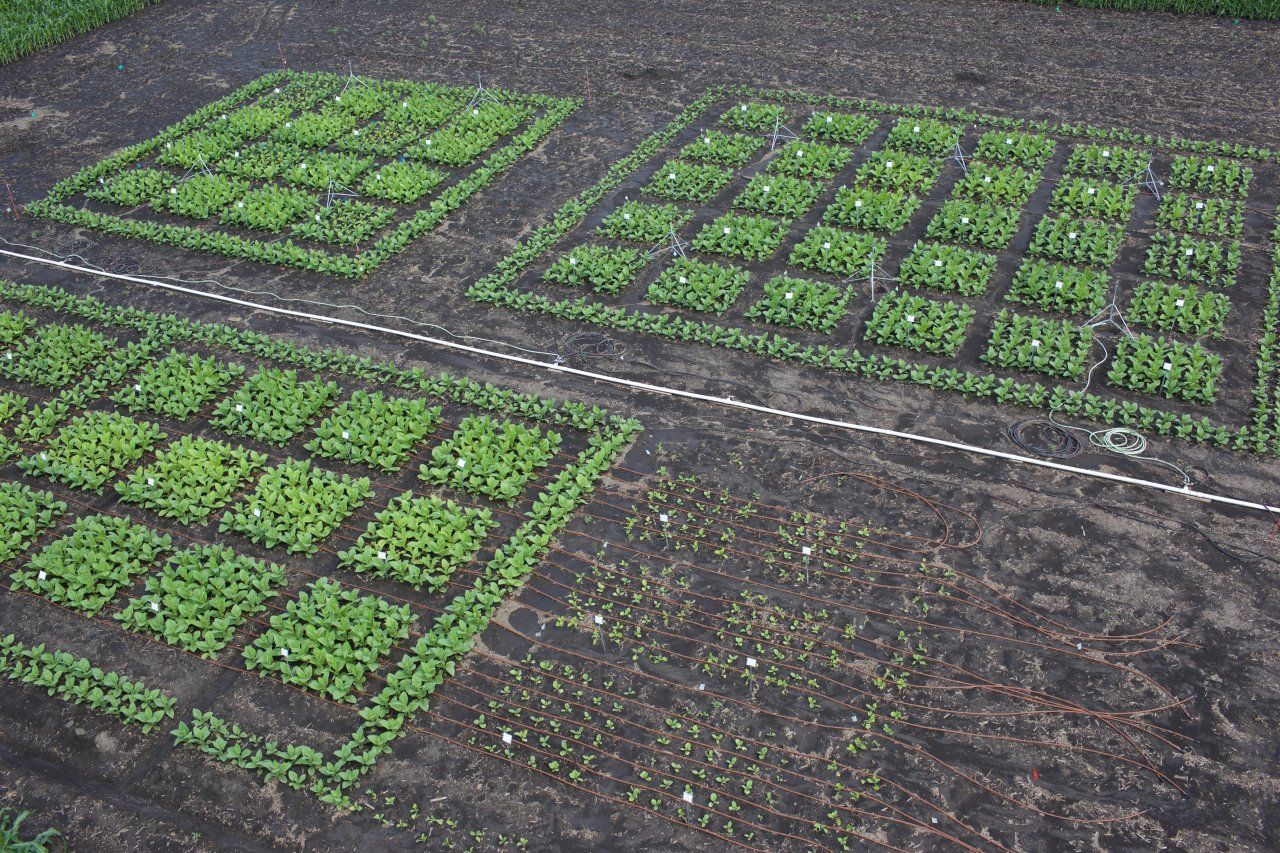
- Established: 2012
- Mission: RIPE is engineering plants to more efficiently turn the sun's energy into food to sustainably increase worldwide food productivity.
- Director: Stephen P. Long
- Budget: $45 million
- Website: ripe.illinois.edu

Realizing Increased Photosynthetic Efficiency (RIPE) is a translational research project that is genetically engineering plants to photosynthesize more efficiently to increase crop yields. RIPE aims to increase agricultural production worldwide, particularly to help reduce hunger and poverty in Sub-Saharan Africa and Southeast Asia by sustainably improving the yield of key food crops including soybeans, rice, cassava and cowpeas. The RIPE project began in 2012, funded by a five-year, $25-million dollar grant from the Bill and Melinda Gates Foundation. In 2017, the project received a $45 million-dollar reinvestment from the Gates Foundation, Foundation for Food and Agriculture Research, and the UK Government's Department for International Development. In 2018, the Gates Foundation contributed an additional $13 million to accelerate the project's progress.

== Background ==
During the 20th century, the Green Revolution dramatically increased yields through advances in plant breeding and land management. This period of agricultural innovation is credited for saving millions of lives. However, these approaches are reaching their biological limits, leading to stagnation in yield improvement. In 2009, the Food and Agriculture Organization projected that global food production must increase by 70% by 2050 to feed an estimated world population of 9 billion people. Meeting the demands of 2050 is further challenged by shrinking arable land, decreasing natural resources, and climate change.

== Research ==
The RIPE project's proof-of-concept study established photosynthesis can be improved to increase yields, published in Science. The Guardian named this discovery one of the 12 key science moments of 2016. Computer model simulations identify strategies to improve the basic underlying mechanisms of photosynthesis and increase yield. First, researchers transform, or genetically engineer, model plants that are tested in controlled environments, e.g. growth chambers and greenhouses. Next, successful transformations are tested in randomized, replicated field trials. Finally, transformations with statistically significant yield increases are translated to the project's target food crops. Likely several approaches could be combined to additively increase yield. "Global access" ensures smallholder farmers will be able to use and afford the project's intellectual property.

Research Strategies	Description
Modeling Photosynthesis	With the rapid increase in high-performance computing, it has become possible to simulate photosynthesis in dynamic models in which each of the coupled reactions is fully represented, providing a realistic in silico representation of the entire process with a system of linked differential equations. We have developed realistic renderings of the crop leaf canopies to more accurately predict the dynamics of crop microclimate and light energy distribution. We can now combine these two kinds of simulations into one robust modeling system.
Relaxing Photoprotection	Through photoprotection, plants protect themselves against damage from high light exposure by dissipating excess light energy as heat. However, this protective process continues when the leaf is shaded by a cloud or by another leaf, which limits photosynthesis. RIPE has identified and up-regulated the genes that speed up this relaxation, which has increased yield by 14%-20% in replicated field trials.
Photorespiratory Bypass	RuBisCO regularly makes the mistake of reacting with oxygen instead of carbon dioxide. The resulting chemicals must be recycled back into the production line, wasting energy through a process called photorespiration. Some bacteria recycle these chemicals more efficiently. RIPE is engineering these more efficient pathways—or shortcuts—into crops. In a landmark study, RIPE scientists engineered photorespiratory shortcuts that increased yield by 40 percent.
RuBP Regeneration	The Calvin Cycle, a key part of photosynthesis, is a multi-step process that regenerates the carbon dioxide acceptor molecule used by RuBisCO to create sugar that fuels plant growth. Each step relies on protein catalysts known as enzymes. RIPE is optimizing the amount of each enzyme so that the entire photosynthetic process becomes more efficient.
Improving RuBisCOs	RIPE has surveyed a wide range of plants and algae to find forms of RuBisCO that are faster and less likely to mistake oxygen for carbon dioxide. The project is now engineering crops with these better-performing forms of RuBisCO or modifying existing RuBisCO to match these more efficient forms.
Optimizing Canopies	Layers of crop leaves create a canopy, but the top leaves receive more light than they can use while the bottom leaves are starved for light. By changing the color and angle of the leaves, light is more evenly distributed throughout the canopy to increase photosynthetic activity throughout the plant.
Algal Mechanisms	RuBisCO catalyzes the extraction of carbon dioxide from the air into sugar to fuel the plant's growth, but is limited by the supply of carbon dioxide. Using mechanisms from algae, plants are being engineered to pump carbon dioxide to RuBisCO to boost photosynthesis.
Mesophyll Conductance	Mesophyll conductance measures how easily carbon dioxide can diffuse through the leaf to reach RuBisCO. RIPE is modifying pathways to help carbon dioxide move through the cell membrane, cytoplasm, chloroplast envelope, and chloroplast stoma to reach RuBisCO.
Advancing Translation	Transformations are confirmed, from gene expression to production of the targeted proteins, and then phenotyped in the greenhouse and tested in replicated field trials. Once a trait is proven to be successful, we begin the more difficult and time-consuming task of transforming staple food crops, including soybeans, cassava, cowpea, and rice.

== Organization ==
RIPE is led by the University of Illinois at the Carl R. Woese Institute for Genomic Biology. The project's partner institutions include the Australian National University, Chinese Academy of Sciences, Commonwealth Scientific and Industrial Research Organisation, Lancaster University, Louisiana State University, University of California at Berkeley, University of Cambridge, University of Essex, and the United States Department of Agriculture/Agricultural Research Service.

The Executive Committee oversees the various research strategies; its members are listed in the table below.

Title	Name	Institution	Objective
Director	Stephen P. Long	University of Illinois; Lancaster University	Modeling Photosynthesis; Relaxing Photoprotection; Mesophyll Conductance
Deputy Director	Donald Ort	University of Illinois	Photorespiratory Bypass
Research Leader	Christine Raines	University of Essex	RuBP Regeneration
Research Leader	Susanne von Caemmerer	Australian National University	Algal Mechanisms
Research Leader	Martin Parry	Lancaster University	Improving Rubisco
Research Leader	Kris Niyogi	University of California at Berkeley	Relaxing Photoprotection
Research Leader	Lisa Ainsworth	University of Illinois	Optimizing Canopies
Research Leader	TJ Higgins	Commonwealth Scientific and Industrial Research Organisation	Advancing Translation
Project Manager	Lisa Emerson	University of Illinois	N/A
