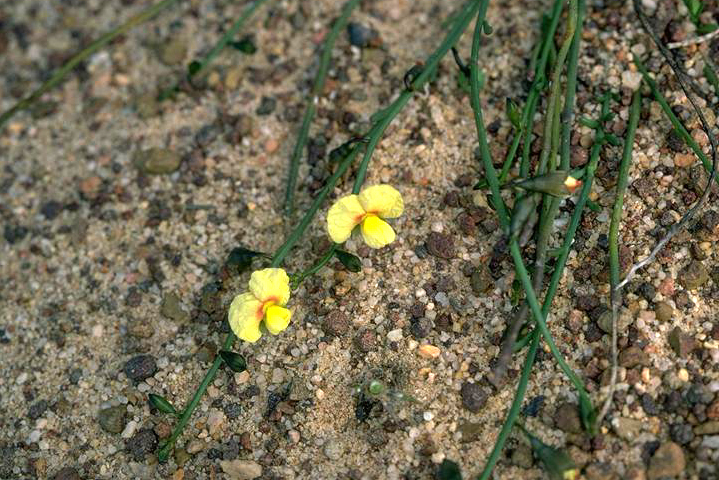
- Near Newdegate

Scientific classification
- Kingdom: Plantae
- Clade: Tracheophytes
- Clade: Angiosperms
- Clade: Eudicots
- Clade: Rosids
- Order: Fabales
- Family: Fabaceae
- Subfamily: Faboideae
- Genus: Sphaerolobium
- Species: S. linophyllum

Binomial name
- Sphaerolobium linophyllum (Hügel ex Benth.) Benth.

Synonyms
- Hugelroea linophylla (Hügel ex Benth.) Steud. nom. inval.; Roea linophylla Hügel ex Benth.

= Sphaerolobium linophyllum =

Species of flowering plant

Sphaerolobium linophyllum is a species of flowering plant in the family Fabaceae and is endemic to the south of Western Australia. It is a prostrate to ascending shrub with a few narrowly linear leaves and red, yellow and orange flowers.

== Description ==
Sphaerolobium linophyllum is a prostrate to ascending shrub that typically grows to a height of 5–40 cm (2.0–15.7 in) and has many stems. It has only a few narrowly linear leaves, the longest 13–25 mm (0.51–0.98 in) long and thick. The flowers are arranged singly in leaf axils with leafy bracts 2.0–6.5 mm (0.079–0.256 in) long at the base. The sepals are about 6.5 mm (0.26 in) long and joined at the base for more than half their length. The flowers are red, yellow and orange, the standard petal about 10 mm (0.39 in) long, the wings curved and slightly shorter than the standard and the keel less than 6 mm (0.24 in) long with a fringe of white hairs. Flowering occurs from September to February and the fruit is an inflated oval pod about 6 mm (0.24 in) long.

== Taxonomy ==
This species of pea was first formally described in 1864 by George Bentham who gave it the name Roea linophylla in Stephan Endlicher's Enumeratio plantarum quas in Novae Hollandiae ora austro-occidentali ad fluvium Cygnorum et in sinu Regis Georgii collegit Carolus Liber Baro de Hügel from an unpublished description by Charles von Hügel of specimens collected near the Swan River. In 1864, Bentham changed the name to Sphaerolobium linophyllum in Flora Australiensis. The specific epithet (linophyllum) means "thread-leaved".

== Distribution and habitat ==
Sphaerolobium linophyllum grows in sandy soils and is widespread in the Avon Wheatbelt, Esperance Plains, Geraldton Sandplains, Jarrah Forest, Mallee, Swan Coastal Plain and Warren bioregions of southern Western Australia and is listed as "not threatened" by the Government of Western Australia Department of Biodiversity, Conservation and Attractions.
