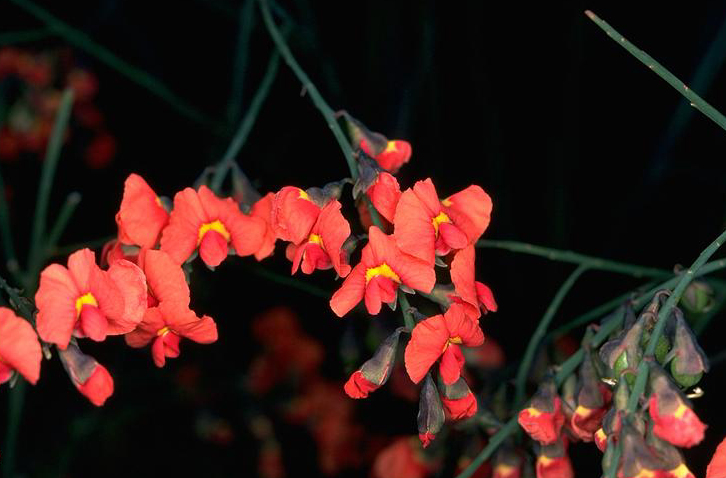
- Near Ravensthorpe

Scientific classification
- Kingdom: Plantae
- Clade: Tracheophytes
- Clade: Angiosperms
- Clade: Eudicots
- Clade: Rosids
- Order: Fabales
- Family: Fabaceae
- Subfamily: Faboideae
- Genus: Sphaerolobium
- Species: S. racemulosum

Binomial name
- Sphaerolobium racemulosum Benth.

= Sphaerolobium racemulosum =

Species of legume

Sphaerolobium nudiflorum is a species of flowering plant in the family Fabaceae and is endemic to the south-west of Western Australia. It is a leafless shrub that typically grows to a height of 0.3–1 m (1 ft 0 in – 3 ft 3 in) and has wiry stems. The flowers are borne in racemes 13–25 mm (0.51–0.98 in) long on short pedicels and are red or reddish-orange, the standard petal twice as long as the sepals. Flowering occurs from July to November and the fruit is an oval to more or less spherical pod about 4 mm (0.16 in) long.

It was first formally described in 1864 by George Bentham in Flora Australiensis. The specific epithet (racemulosum) means "having a small raceme".

Sphaerolobium racemulosum grows in swampy areas, near rivers and on slopes in the Esperance Plains, Jarrah Forest and Warren bioregions of south-western Western Australia and is listed as "not threatened" by the Government of Western Australia Department of Biodiversity, Conservation and Attractions.
