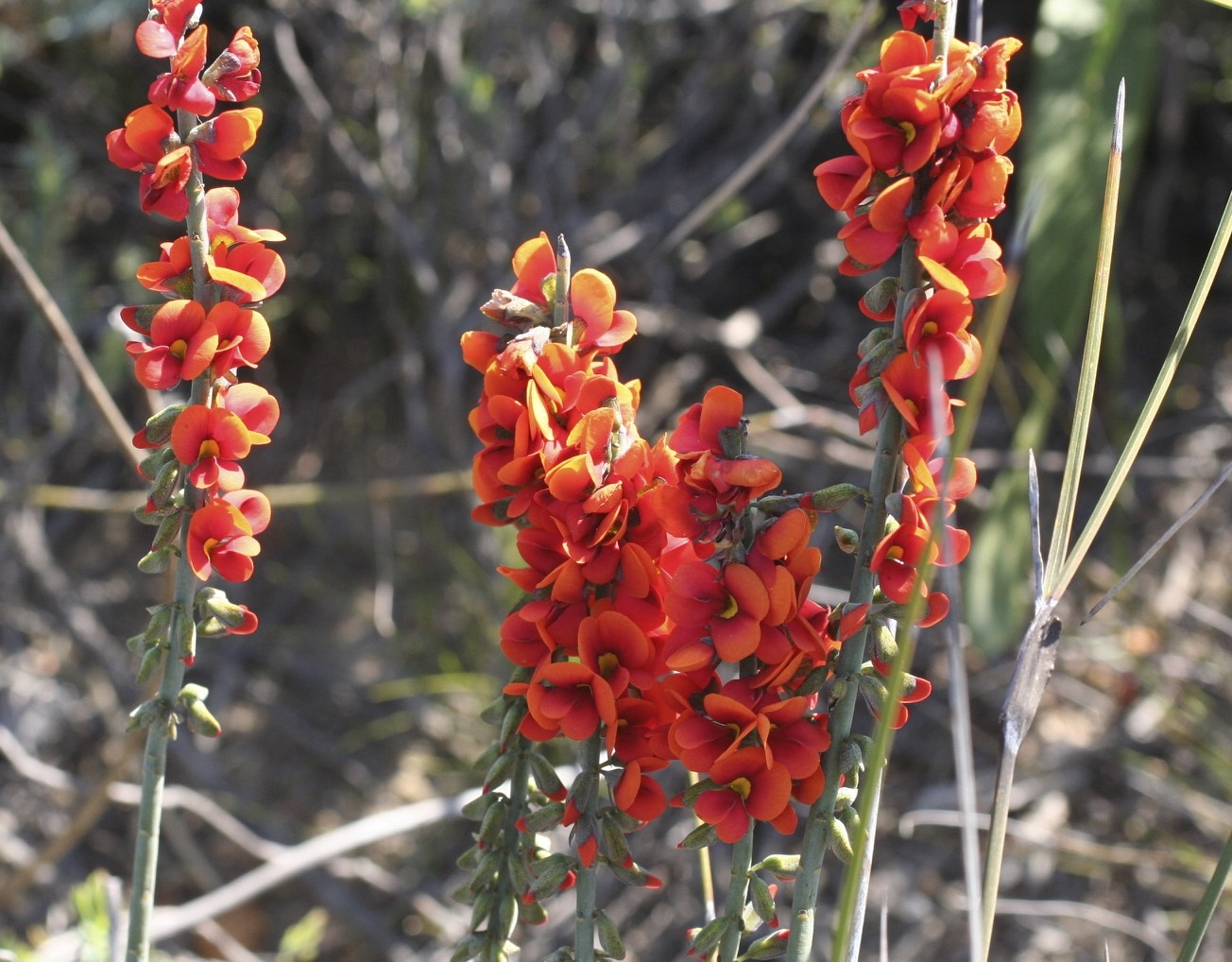
- Near Badgingarra

Scientific classification
- Kingdom: Plantae
- Clade: Tracheophytes
- Clade: Angiosperms
- Clade: Eudicots
- Clade: Rosids
- Order: Fabales
- Family: Fabaceae
- Subfamily: Faboideae
- Genus: Sphaerolobium
- Species: S. drummondii

Binomial name
- Sphaerolobium drummondii Turcz.

Synonyms
- Sphaerolobium aff. macranthum; Sphaerolobium crassirameum Meisn.; Sphaerolobium drummondii subsp. cordatum R.Butcher MS

= Sphaerolobium drummondii =

Species of flowering plant

Sphaerolobium drummondii is a species of flowering plant in the family Fabaceae and is endemic to the south-west of Western Australia. It is an erect, leafless shrub with red and yellow or orange flowers from July to November.

It was first formally described in 1853 by Nikolai Turczaninow in the Bulletin de la Société Impériale des Naturalistes de Moscou. The specific epithet (drummondii) honours James Drummond.

Sphaerolobium drummondii grows on sandplains, in swampy areas and on granite slopes in the Avon Wheatbelt, Esperance Plains, Geraldton Sandplains, Jarrah Forest, Mallee, Swan Coastal Plain and Warren bioregions of south-western Western Australia and is listed as "not threatened" by the Government of Western Australia Department of Biodiversity, Conservation and Attractions.
