= Donald R. Ort =

American botanist and biochemist

Donald Richard Ort
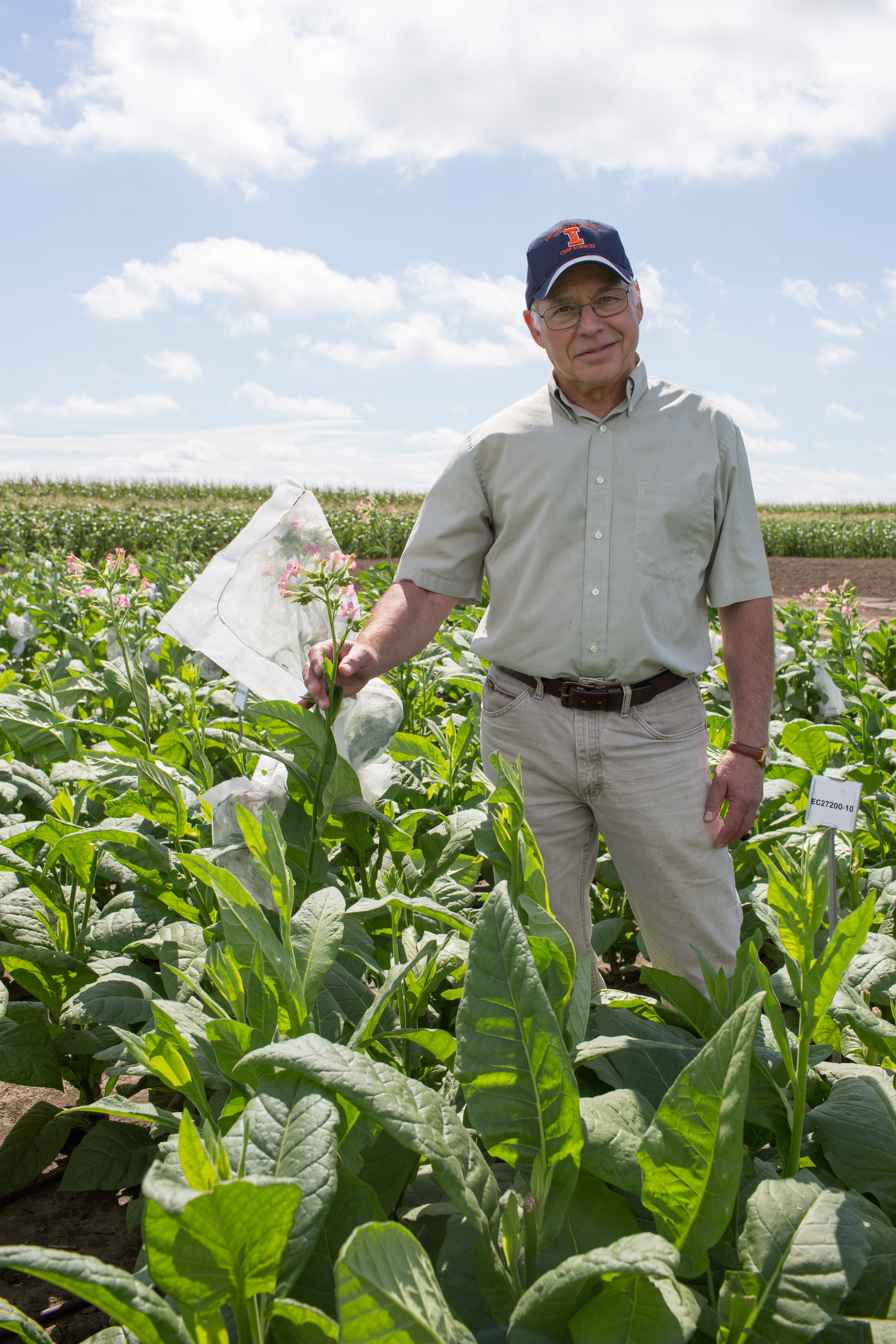
- Donald R. Ort inspects a model crop at the South Farms.
- Citizenship: United States
- Education: Wake Forest University (BSc); Michigan State University (PhD)
- Scientific career
- Fields: Plant science; Photosynthesis; Global change; Molecular biology
- Workplaces: University of Illinois (1978–present); University of Essex (1986–1987)
- Website: lab.igb.illinois.edu/ort/

Donald Richard Ort is an American botanist and biochemist. He is the Robert Emerson Professor of Plant Biology and Crop Sciences at the University of Illinois at Urbana-Champaign where he works on improving crop productivity and resilience to climate change by redesigning photosynthesis. He is a member of the National Academy of Sciences (NAS) and a fellow of the American Association for the Advancement of Science (AAAS) and American Society of Plant Biologists (ASPB).

== Early life and education ==
He earned his bachelor's degree in biology and chemistry from Wake Forest University in 1971 and went on to earn his doctorate in plant biochemistry from Michigan State University in 1974. Following his doctorate, Ort was an NIH postdoctoral research fellow at Purdue University (1974–1976) and later at the University of Washington (1976–1978).

== Career ==
Ort joined the faculty at the University of Illinois at Urbana-Champaign as an assistant professor in 1978 and went on to become an associate professor in 1982, and later, a full professor in 1985. From 1978 to 2018, Ort was a research plant physiologist with the Global Change and Photosynthesis Research Unit of the United States Department of Agriculture Agricultural Research Service (ARS); he served as the Research Leader of the Unit from 1997 to 2018. From 1986 to 1987, he was a visiting professor at the University of Essex.

Ort has served as president of the International Society of Photosynthesis Research, the International Association of Plant Physiology, and the American Society of Plant Biologists (ASPB). He also served as editor-in-chief of Plant Physiology and is an associate editor of the Annual Review of Plant Biology. Today, Ort leads the Genomic Ecology of Global Change research theme at the Carl R. Woese Institute for Genomic Biology.

He is a member of the editorial board for PNAS.

== Research ==
Ort helped found the SoyFACE (Soybean Free-Air Concentration Enrichment) research facility to study the effect of rising atmospheric carbon dioxide, ozone, and temperature on crops, and served as the facility's director from 2007 to 2018. In 2019, he showed that a synthetic pathway for photorespiration could increase plant productivity. Over the past decade, Ort's research interests have focused on the effect that specific environmental factors and abiotic stresses have on the photosynthetic performance of crop plants and on improving photosynthetic efficiency to increase crop yields. Ort serves as a leader for many research projects including as deputy director of Realizing Increased Photosynthetic Efficiency (RIPE) and deputy director for Research & Development for the Center for Advanced Biofuel and Bioproduct Innovation (CABBI).

== Other honors and awards ==
The Agricultural Research Service recognized Ort as the Senior Area Midwest Researcher of the Year in 1993 and as a Supergrade Scientist in 2003. He was also a recipient of various Merit Awards from the United States Department of Agriculture. The College of Agricultural, Consumer and Environmental Sciences (ACES) recognized Ort with the ACES Service Award in 2005 and the Team Research Award in 2006. The American Society of Plant Biologists (ASPB) presented Ort with the Kettering Award in 2006. From 2011 to 2013, he received a Distinguished Professor Fellowship from the Chinese Academy of Sciences. Ort was inducted into the Agricultural Research Service Science Hall of Fame in 2015. Ort became an elected member of the National Academy of Sciences in 2017, an elected fellow of the American Association for the Advancement of Science in 2009, and an elected fellow of the American Society of Plant Biologists (ASPB) in 2007. In 2020, ASPB recognized Ort with the Charles Reid Barnes Life Membership Award. Ort has been recognized as a Pioneer Member of the American Society of Plant Biologists.
