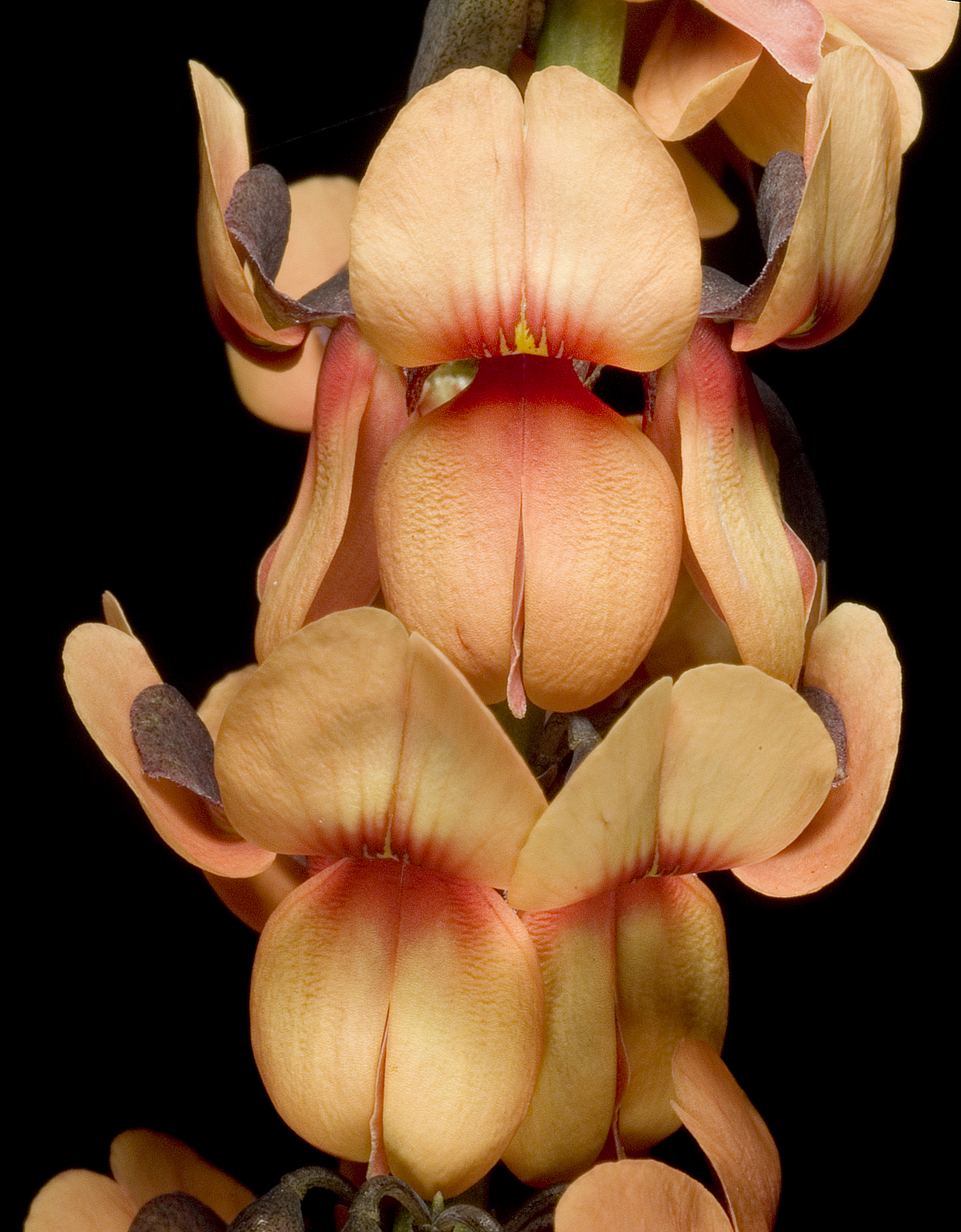

Scientific classification
- Kingdom: Plantae
- Clade: Tracheophytes
- Clade: Angiosperms
- Clade: Eudicots
- Clade: Rosids
- Order: Fabales
- Family: Fabaceae
- Subfamily: Faboideae
- Genus: Sphaerolobium
- Species: S. medium

Binomial name
- Sphaerolobium medium R.Br.

= Sphaerolobium medium =

Species of legume

Sphaerolobium medium is a species of flowering plant in the family Fabaceae and is endemic to the south-west of Western Australia. It is an erect, leafless shrub that typically grows to a height of 10–60 cm (3.9–23.6 in) and has yellow or orange and red flowers from August to December. It was first formally described in 1811 by Robert Brown in Aiton's Hortus Kewensis. The specific epithet (medium) means "intermediate between other species".

This pea is widespread in the south-west of Western Australia and is listed as "not threatened" by the Government of Western Australia Department of Biodiversity, Conservation and Attractions.
