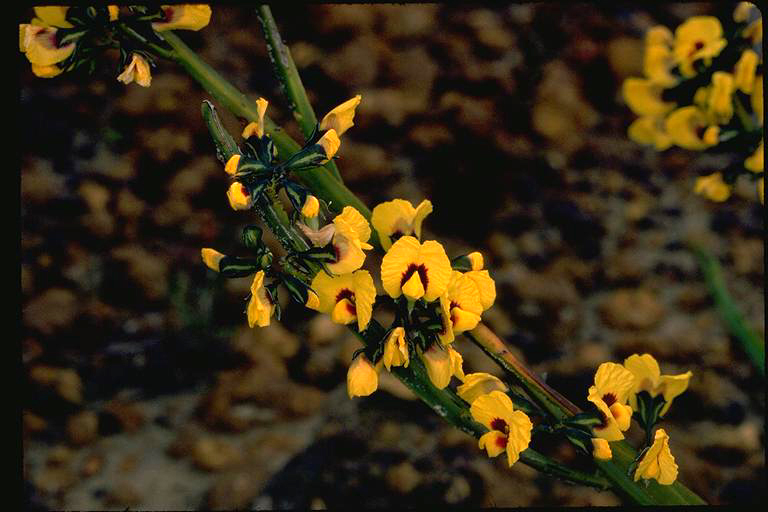
- Near the Pallinup River

Scientific classification
- Kingdom: Plantae
- Clade: Tracheophytes
- Clade: Angiosperms
- Clade: Eudicots
- Clade: Rosids
- Order: Fabales
- Family: Fabaceae
- Subfamily: Faboideae
- Genus: Sphaerolobium
- Species: S. alatum

Binomial name
- Sphaerolobium alatum Benth.

= Sphaerolobium alatum =

Species of flowering plant

Sphaerolobium alatum is a species of flowering plant in the family Fabaceae and is endemic to the south of Western Australia. It is a slender, leafless shrub with yellow and reddish-brown flowers from September to November.

It was first formally described in 1837 by George Bentham in Stephan Endlicher's Enumeratio plantarum quas in Novae Hollandiae ora austro-occidentali ad fluvium Cygnorum et in sinu Regis Georgii collegit Carolus Liber Baro de Hügel. The specific epithet (alatum) means "winged".

Sphaerolobium alatum occurs in the Avon Wheatbelt, Esperance Plains, Jarrah Forest and Warren bioregions of southern Western Australia and is listed as "not threatened" by the Government of Western Australia Department of Biodiversity, Conservation and Attractions.
