= Sphaerolobium daviesioides =

Scientific classification
- Kingdom: Plantae
- Clade: Tracheophytes
- Clade: Angiosperms
- Clade: Eudicots
- Clade: Rosids
- Order: Fabales
- Family: Fabaceae
- Subfamily: Faboideae
- Genus: Sphaerolobium
- Species: S. daviesioides

Binomial name
- Sphaerolobium daviesioides Turcz.

Species of flowering plant

Sphaerolobium daviesioides, commonly known as prickly globe-pea, is a species of flowering plant in the family Fabaceae and is endemic to the south of Western Australia. It is an erect, rigid, leafless shrub with orange or yellow and red flowers from August to October.

It was first formally described in 1853 by Nikolai Turczaninow in the Bulletin de la Société Impériale des Naturalistes de Moscou. The specific epithet (daviesioides) means "Daviesia-like".

Sphaerolobium daviesioides grows on sandplain in the Esperance Plains, Hampton and Mallee bioregions of southern Western Australia and is listed as "not threatened" by the Government of Western Australia Department of Biodiversity, Conservation and Attractions.
