= Sphaerolobium gracile =

Scientific classification
- Kingdom: Plantae
- Clade: Tracheophytes
- Clade: Angiosperms
- Clade: Eudicots
- Clade: Rosids
- Order: Fabales
- Family: Fabaceae
- Subfamily: Faboideae
- Genus: Sphaerolobium
- Species: S. gracile

Binomial name
- Sphaerolobium gracile Benth.

Species of flowering plant

Sphaerolobium gracile is a species of flowering plant in the family Fabaceae and is endemic to the south-west of Western Australia. It is a low, straggling or prostrate shrub that typically grows to a height of up to 0.8 m (2 ft 7 in) and has a few short, linear leaves and yellow or orange flowers from September to January.

It was first formally described in 1864 by George Bentham in Flora Australiensis from specimens collected north of the Murchison River by Augustus Oldfield. The specific epithet (gracile) means "thin" or "slender".

Sphaerolobium gracile grows in sand in the Avon Wheatbelt, Geraldton Sandplains and Swan Coastal Plain bioregions of south-western Western Australia and is listed as "not threatened" by the Government of Western Australia Department of Biodiversity, Conservation and Attractions.
