= Sphaerolobium validum =

Conservation status
- Priority Three — Poorly Known Taxa (DEC)

Scientific classification
- Kingdom: Plantae
- Clade: Tracheophytes
- Clade: Angiosperms
- Clade: Eudicots
- Clade: Rosids
- Order: Fabales
- Family: Fabaceae
- Subfamily: Faboideae
- Genus: Sphaerolobium
- Species: S. validum

Binomial name
- Sphaerolobium validum Butcher

Synonyms
- Sphaerolobium macranthum var. parviflorum Benth.; Sphaerolobium parviflorum (Benth.) R.Butcher ms.

Species of flowering plant

Sphaerolobium validum is a species of flowering plant in the family Fabaceae and is endemic to the south of Western Australia. It is an erect shrub that typically grows to a height of up to 90 cm (35 in) and has yellow and red flowers in September. It was first formally described in 2001 by Ryonen Butcher in Australian Systematic Botany from specimens collected near Jerramungup in 1999. The specific epithet (validum) means "strong" or "stout".

Sphaerolobium validum grows in undulating areas, on flats and on roadsides in the Esperance Plains and Mallee bioregions of southern Western Australia. It is listed as "Priority Three" by the Government of Western Australia Department of Biodiversity, Conservation and Attractions, meaning that it is poorly known and known from only a few locations but is not under imminent threat.
