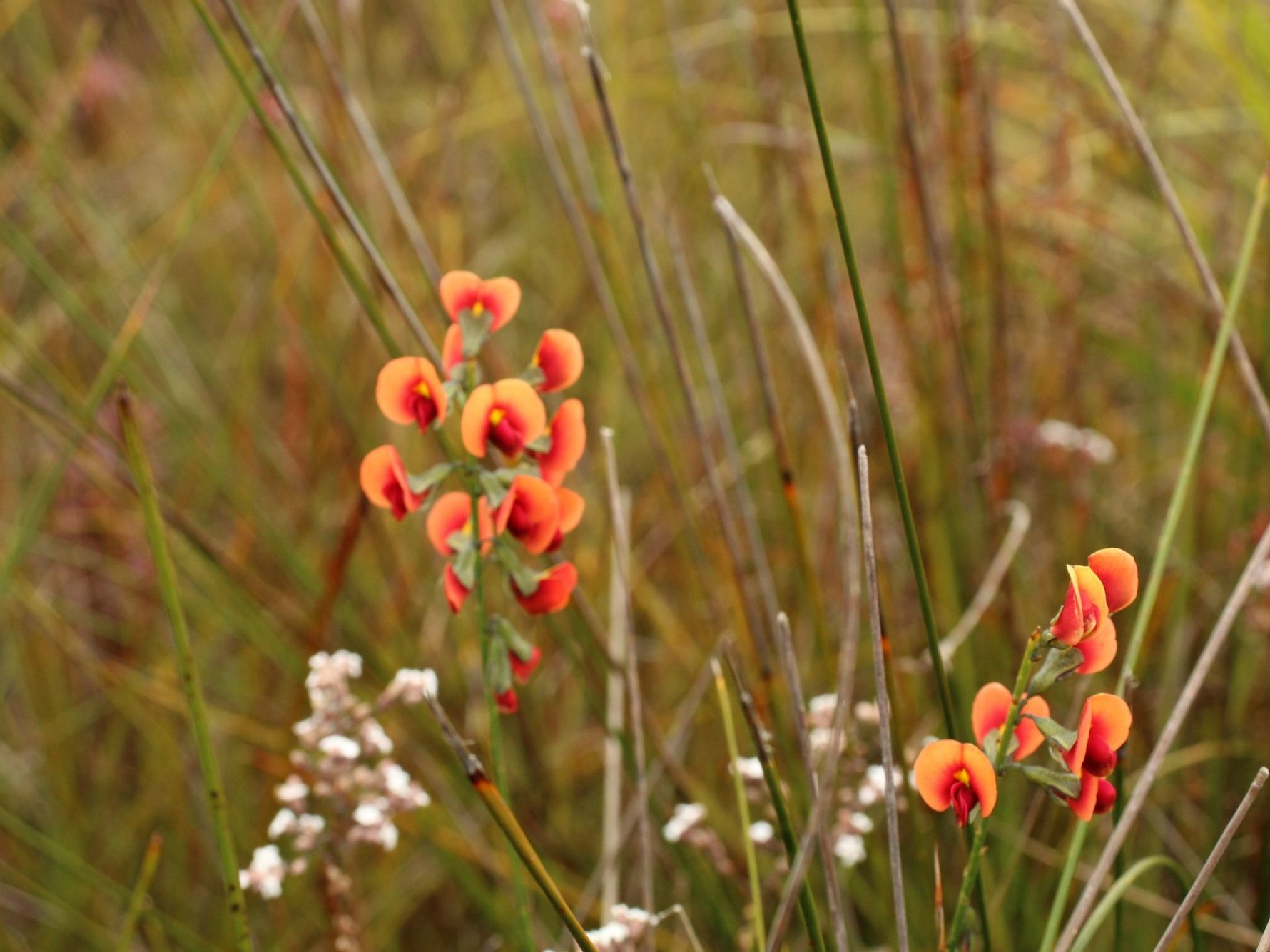

Scientific classification
- Kingdom: Plantae
- Clade: Tracheophytes
- Clade: Angiosperms
- Clade: Eudicots
- Clade: Rosids
- Order: Fabales
- Family: Fabaceae
- Subfamily: Faboideae
- Genus: Sphaerolobium
- Species: S. hygrophilum

Binomial name
- Sphaerolobium hygrophilum Butcher

= Sphaerolobium hygrophilum =

Species of flowering plant

Sphaerolobium hygrophilum is a species of flowering plant in the family Fabaceae and is endemic to the south-west of Western Australia. It is an erect shrub with many stems, that typically grows to a height of up to 1.7 m (5 ft 7 in) and has pink to red or orange flowers from August to December. It was first formally described in 2004 by Ryonen Butcher in Australian Systematic Botany from specimens collected near Northcliffe in 2000. The specific epithet (hygrophilum) means "water-loving".

Sphaerolobium hygrophilum grows in winter-wet areas, swamps and near watercourses in the Jarrah Forest, Swan Coastal Plain and Warren bioregions of south-western Western Australia and is listed as "not threatened" by the Government of Western Australia Department of Biodiversity, Conservation and Attractions.
