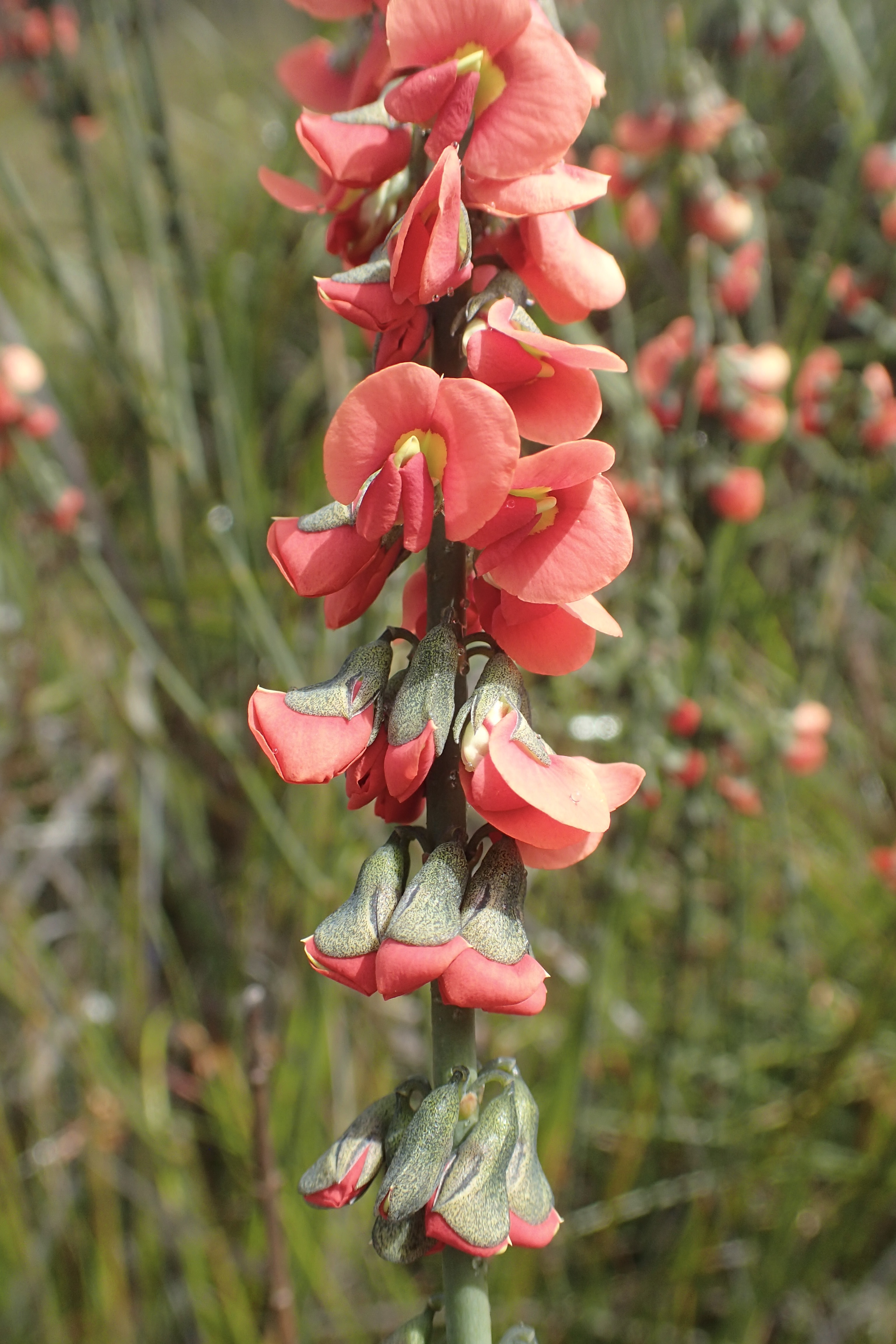

Scientific classification
- Kingdom: Plantae
- Clade: Tracheophytes
- Clade: Angiosperms
- Clade: Eudicots
- Clade: Rosids
- Order: Fabales
- Family: Fabaceae
- Subfamily: Faboideae
- Genus: Sphaerolobium
- Species: S. rostratum

Binomial name
- Sphaerolobium rostratum Butcher

= Sphaerolobium rostratum =

Species of flowering plant

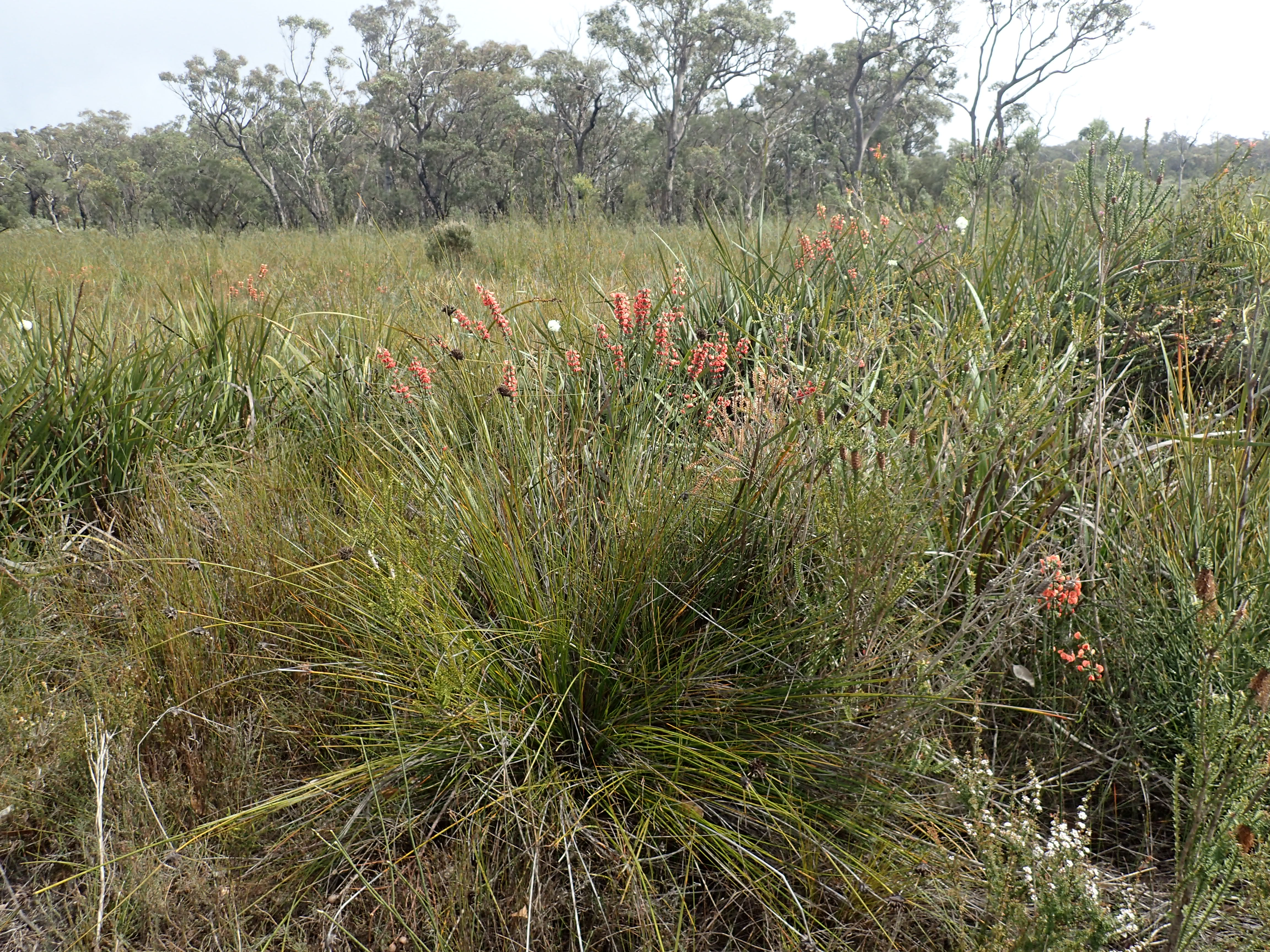
Habit near Denmark

Sphaerolobium rostratum is a species of flowering plant in the family Fabaceae and is endemic to the south of Western Australia. It is an erect to sprawling shrub or subshrub with slender stems, tapering linear leaves and loose racemes of pink and cream-coloured flowers.

== Description ==
Sphaerolobium rostratum is an erect to sprawling shrub or subshrub that typically grows to a height of 0.6–1.6 m (2 ft 0 in – 5 ft 3 in). Its leaves are tapering linear, about 1 mm (0.039 in) long, 0.4 mm (0.016 in) wide and sessile, but that fall off before flowering. The flowers are arranged on the ends of the branches in loose racemes 150–350 mm (5.9–13.8 in) long with 5 to 20 flowers, each on a pedicel 1.6–1.7 mm (0.063–0.067 in) long with bracts and bracteoles but that fall off as the flowers open. The sepals are joined at the base to form a top-shaped to bell-shaped tube 4–6 mm (0.16–0.24 in) long, the upper two lobes 2–4 mm (0.079–0.157 in) long and fused for most of their length and the lower three lobes 2–3 mm (0.079–0.118 in) long. The standard petal is broadly heart-shaped to more or less round, 5–9 mm (0.20–0.35 in) long, 6–8 mm (0.24–0.31 in) wide and pink. The wings are 8.0–9.5 mm (0.31–0.37 in) long and dark pink, and the keel 9–11 mm (0.35–0.43 in) long and cream-coloured. Flowering occurs from September to December and the fruit is a flattened, more or less spherical pod about 4 mm (0.16 in) long and wide.

== Taxonomy ==
Sphaerolobium rostratum was first formally described in 1998 by Ryonen Butcher in the journal Nuytsia from specimens collected near Bow Bridge in 1997. The specific epithet (rostratum) means "beaked", referring to the tip of the keel petals.

== Distribution and habitat ==
This species of pea grows in winter-wet swamps and along creek lines mostly in the Walpole-Nornalup National Park in the Jarrah Forest and Warren bioregions of southern Western Australia.

== Conservation status ==
Sphaerolobium rostratum is listed as "not threatened" by the Government of Western Australia Department of Biodiversity, Conservation and Attractions.
