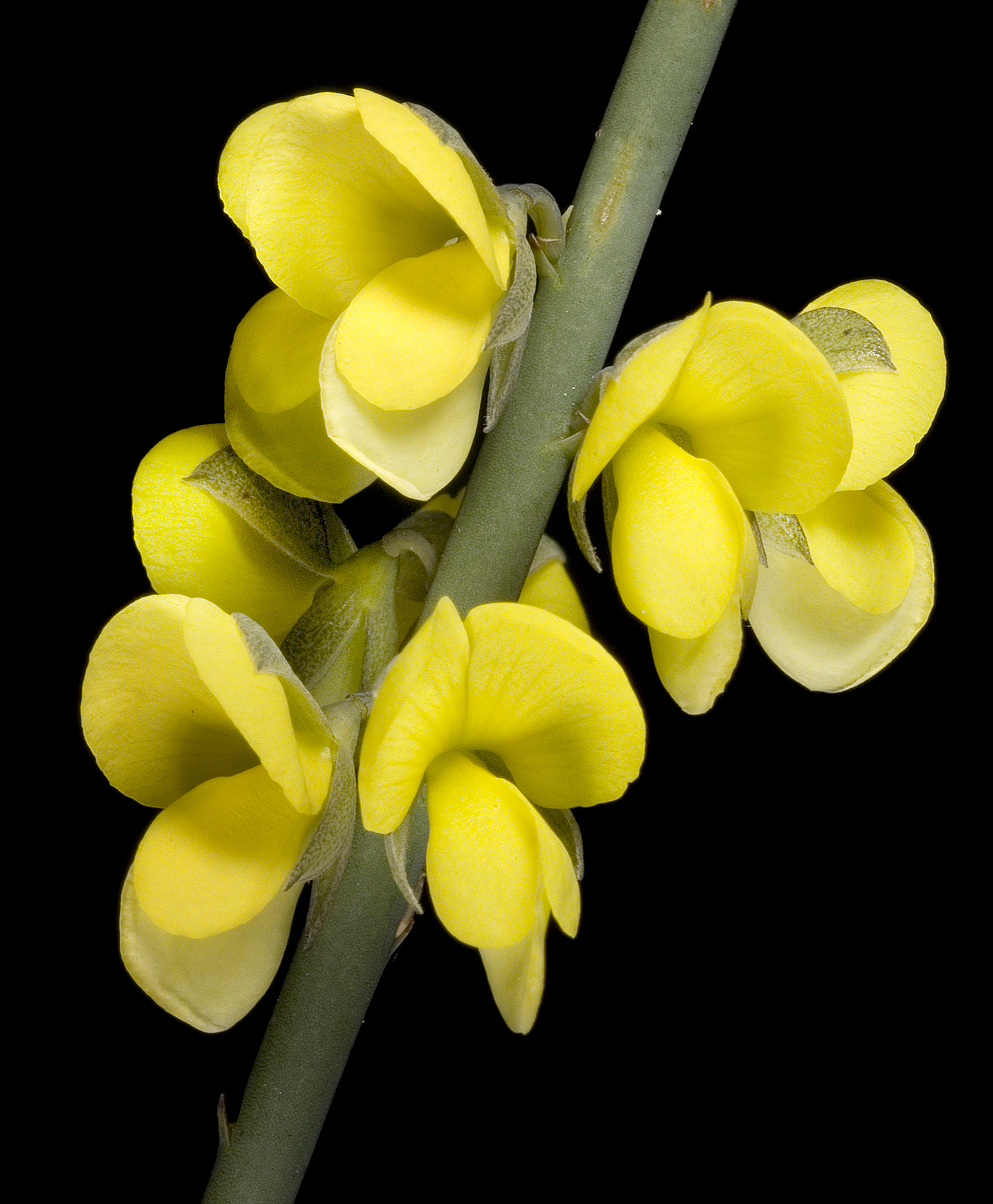
- Sphaerolobium macranthum

Scientific classification
- Kingdom: Plantae
- Clade: Tracheophytes
- Clade: Angiosperms
- Clade: Eudicots
- Clade: Rosids
- Order: Fabales
- Family: Fabaceae
- Subfamily: Faboideae
- Clade: Mirbelioids
- Genus: Sphaerolobium; Sm.

Species
- See text

= Sphaerolobium =

Genus of legumes

Sphaerolobium is a genus of flowering plants in the family Fabaceae and is endemic to Australia, occurring in all states and territories except the Northern Territory. Species of Sphaerolobium are erect shrubs, usually with rush-like stems and yellow or red flowers similar to others in the family.

== Description ==
Plants in the genus Sphaerolobium are perennial shrubs, the stems often rush-like, leafless and winged or ridged. The leaves, when present are simple, linear and lack stipules. The sepals are joined forming a bell-shaped tube with five overlapping teeth, the upper two forming a curved "lip". The petals are yellow or red and pea-like, the keel shorter than the other petals. The fruit is a spherical or flattened pod containing one or two seeds.

== Taxonomy ==
The genus Sphaerolobium was first formally described in 1805 by James Edward Smith in Annals of Botany. The name Sphaerolobium means "ball-pod".

=== Species list ===
The following is a list of species of Spaerolobium accepted by the Australian Plant Census as of June 2022:

- Sphaerolobium acanthos Crisp — Grampians globe-pea (Vic.)
- Sphaerolobium alatum Benth. (W.A.)
- Sphaerolobium benetectum R.Butcher (W.A.)
- Sphaerolobium calcicola R.Butcher (W.A.)
- Sphaerolobium daviesioides Turcz. – prickly globe-pea (W.A.)
- Sphaerolobium drummondii Turcz. (W.A.)
- Sphaerolobium fornicatum Benth. (W.A.)
- Sphaerolobium gracile Benth. (W.A.)
- Sphaerolobium grandiflorum Benth. (W.A.)
- Sphaerolobium hygrophilum R.Butcher (W.A.)
- Sphaerolobium linophyllum (Hügel ex Benth.) Benth. (W.A.)
- Sphaerolobium macranthum Meisn. (W.A.)
- Sphaerolobium medium R.Br. (W.A.)
- Sphaerolobium minus Labill. (S.A., Qld., N.S.W., A.C.T., Vic., Tas.)
- Sphaerolobium nudiflorum (Meisn.) Benth. (W.A.)
- Sphaerolobium pubescens R.Butcher (W.A.)
- Sphaerolobium pulchellum Meisn. (W.A.)
- Sphaerolobium racemulosum Benth. (W.A.)
- Sphaerolobium rostratum Butcher (W.A.)
- Sphaerolobium scabriusculum Meisn. (W.A.)
- Sphaerolobium validum R.Butcher (W.A.)
- Sphaerolobium vimineum Sm. — leafless globe-pea (W.A., S.A., Qld., N.S.W., Vic., Tas.)
