= Sphaerolobium acanthos =

Conservation status
- Critically endangered (EPBC Act)

Scientific classification
- Kingdom: Plantae
- Clade: Embryophytes
- Clade: Tracheophytes
- Clade: Spermatophytes
- Clade: Angiosperms
- Clade: Eudicots
- Clade: Rosids
- Order: Fabales
- Family: Fabaceae
- Subfamily: Faboideae
- Genus: Sphaerolobium
- Species: S. acanthos

Binomial name
- Sphaerolobium acanthos Crisp

Species of flowering plant

Sphaerolobium acanthos, commonly known as Grampians globe-pea, is a species of flowering plant in the family Fabaceae and is endemic to a restricted part of the Grampians National Park in Victoria, Australia. It is an erect, wiry shrub with many spiny branchlets, scattered tapering leaves, and yellow, orange or reddish-brown flowers.

== Description ==
Sphaerolobium acanthos is an erect, wiry shrub that typically grows to a height of 0.2–1 m (7.9 in – 3 ft 3.4 in) and has many widely-spreading, spiny branchlets up to 20 mm (0.79 in) long, often forked at the tip. Its leaves are 2–3 mm (0.079–0.118 in) long and tapered, falling off at maturity. The flowers are yellow, orange or reddish-brown and arranged singly or in pairs in leaf axils on a peduncle up to 1.5 mm (0.059 in) long. Each flower is on a pedicel about 1.5 mm (0.059 in) long with egg-shaped bracts and bracteoles. The sepals are 3.5–4.5 mm (0.14–0.18 in) long, joined to form a bell-shaped base, with overlapping lobes, the two upper lobes forming a wedge-shaped "lip". The standard petal is broadly elliptic, 7.0–7.5 mm (0.28–0.30 in) long, the wings and keel about the same length as each other. Flowering occurs from November to January and the fruit is an inflated, oval pod about 4.5 mm (0.18 in) long.

== Taxonomy and naming ==
Sphaerolobium acanthos was first formally described in 1994 by Michael Crisp in the journal Muelleria from specimens collected from the Grampians National Park in 1977. The specific epithet (acanthos) means "a prickly plant".

== Distribution and habitat ==
Grampians globe-pea grows in forest, woodland and heath, usually near streams and is restricted to a small area in the Grampians National Park.

== Conservation status ==
Sphaerolobium acanthos is classified as "critically endangered" under the Commonwealth Government Environment Protection and Biodiversity Conservation Act 1999 and as "vulnerable" under the Victorian Government Flora and Fauna Guarantee Act 1988. The main threats to the species include grazing by herbivores and disease caused by the fungus Phytophthora cinnamomi.
