= Sphaerolobium pubescens =

Scientific classification
- Kingdom: Plantae
- Clade: Tracheophytes
- Clade: Angiosperms
- Clade: Eudicots
- Clade: Rosids
- Order: Fabales
- Family: Fabaceae
- Subfamily: Faboideae
- Genus: Sphaerolobium
- Species: S. pubescens

Binomial name
- Sphaerolobium pubescens Butcher

Species of flowering plant

Sphaerolobium pubescens is a species of flowering plant in the family Fabaceae and is endemic to the south of Western Australia. It is a small shrub or subshrub with slender stems, tapering linear leaves and dense racemes of yellow flowers.

== Description ==
Sphaerolobium pubescens is a shrub or subshrub that typically grows to a height of 20–45 cm (7.9–17.7 in) and has erect, slender stems. The leaves are tapering linear, about 1 mm (0.039 in) long, 0.5 mm (0.020 in) wide and sessile. The flowers are arranged on the ends of the branches in dense racemes about 50 mm (2.0 in) with 20 to 32 flowers, each on a pedicel about 1.5 mm (0.059 in) long with bracts and bracteoles but that fall off as the flowers open. The sepals are egg-shaped, 2.5–4 mm (0.098–0.157 in) long and joined at the base, the two upper lobes joined for more than half their length. The standard petal is broadly heart-shaped with a notched tip, 4–6 mm (0.16–0.24 in) long and wide and yellow. The wings are 4.5–5.5 mm (0.18–0.22 in) long, yellow and reddish purple, and the keel 3.0–4.5 mm (0.12–0.18 in) long. Flowering occurs in October and November and the fruit is a more or less spherical pod about 3 mm (0.12 in) long and wide.

== Taxonomy ==
Sphaerolobium pubescens was first formally described in 1998 by Ryonen Butcher in the journal Nuytsia from specimens collected near Narrikup in 1996. The specific epithet (pubescens) means "downy, with soft, fine hairs".

== Distribution and habitat ==
This species of pea grows in winter-wet areas and undulating plains in near coastal areas of the Esperance Plains, Jarrah Forest and Warren bioregions of southern Western Australia.

== Conservation status ==
Sphaerolobium pubescens is listed as "not threatened" by the Government of Western Australia Department of Biodiversity, Conservation and Attractions.
