= GCB Bioenergy =

GCB Bioenergy: Bioproducts for a Sustainable Bioeconomy
- Discipline: Bioenergy, biofuels, bioproducts
- Language: English
- Edited by: Andrew Leakey

Publication details
- Former name: GCB Bioenergy
- History: Since 2009
- Publisher: Wiley-Blackwell
- Frequency: Monthly
- Open access: Yes
- License: Creative Commons Attribution License
- Impact factor: 4.9 (2025)

Standard abbreviations
- ISO 4: GCB Bioenergy

Indexing
- ISSN: 1757-1707
- LCCN: 2009204036
- OCLC no.: 712800958

Links
- Journal homepage

GCB Bioenergy: Bioproducts for a Sustainable Bioeconomy is a monthly peer-reviewed scientific journal covering research on the interface between biological systems and the production of bioenergy, biofuels and bioproducts directly from plants, algae and waste. The editor-in-chief is Andrew Leakey (University of Illinois). The journal was established by Stephen P. Long (University of Illinois and Lancaster University).

The journal is a sister journal of Global Change Biology.
