= Sphaerolobium scabriusculum =

Scientific classification
- Kingdom: Plantae
- Clade: Tracheophytes
- Clade: Angiosperms
- Clade: Eudicots
- Clade: Rosids
- Order: Fabales
- Family: Fabaceae
- Subfamily: Faboideae
- Genus: Sphaerolobium
- Species: S. scabriusculum

Binomial name
- Sphaerolobium scabriusculum Meisn.

Species of plant

Sphaerolobium scabriusculum is a species of flowering plant in the family Fabaceae and is endemic to the south-west of Western Australia. It is an erect, leafless shrub that typically grow to a height of 30–60 mm (1.2–2.4 in). Its flowers are pendulous, and usually arranged singly in leaf axils with a short, scale-like bract at the base. The sepals are about 8.5 mm (0.33 in) long and joined at the base for about half their length. The petals are yellow, the standard and wings petals longer than the sepals and the keel usually about 12.5 mm (0.49 in) long. Flowering occurs from September to November.

Sphaerolobium scabriusculum was first formally described in 1848 by Carl Meissner in Lehmann's Plantae Preissianae from specimens collected in the Swan River Colony by James Drummond. The specific epithet (scabriusculum) means "minutely scabrous".

This species grows on hillslopes and sandplains in the Esperance Plains, Jarrah Forest, Swan Coastal Plain and Warren bioregions of south-western Western Australia and is listed as "not threatened" by the Government of Western Australia Department of Biodiversity, Conservation and Attractions.
