= In silico Plants =

in silico Plants
- Discipline: Plant biology, Crop science, Mathematical biology, Computational biology, Systems biology
- Language: English
- Edited by: Christine Raines (interim)

Publication details
- History: 2019-present
- Publisher: Oxford University Press on behalf of the Annals of Botany Company
- Frequency: Upon acceptance
- Open access: yes
- License: Creative Commons Attribution License 4.0
- Impact factor: 3.3 (2025)

Standard abbreviations
- ISO 4: in silico Plants

Indexing
- CODEN: ISPNCQ
- ISSN: 2517-5025 (print); 2517-5025 (web)

Links
- Journal homepage

in silico Plants (isP) is a peer-reviewed open-access, non-profit scientific journal established in 2019 and publishing on all aspects of computational plant biology. The journal was founded by former editor-in-chief Stephen P. Long, environmental plant physiologist, Fellow of the Royal Society and member of the National Academy of Sciences (University of Illinois and Lancaster University). The journal is published through Oxford University Press but owned and managed by the Annals of Botany Company, a non-profit educational charity registered with the Charity Commission for England and Wales. in silico Plants is listed in the Directory of Open Access Journals, and indexed in Scopus and the Emerging Sources Citation Index.

in silico Plants is the sister journal of AoB Plants, an open-access plant biology journal, and Annals of Botany, a subscription-based botanical journal.

== Abstracting and indexing ==
The journal is abstracted and indexed in:

- Dimensions
- PubMed
- Scopus
