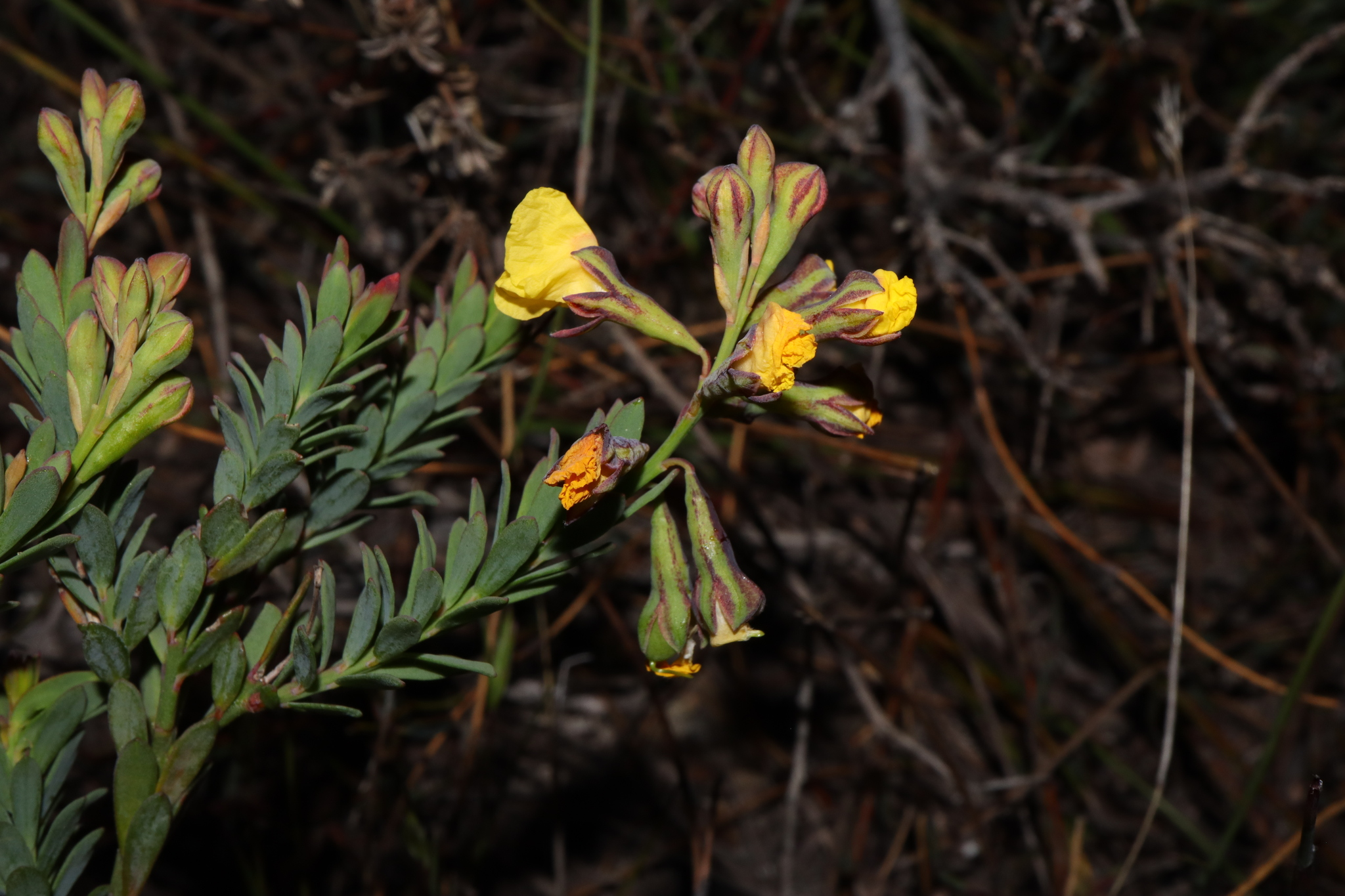

Scientific classification
- Kingdom: Plantae
- Clade: Tracheophytes
- Clade: Angiosperms
- Clade: Eudicots
- Clade: Rosids
- Order: Fabales
- Family: Fabaceae
- Subfamily: Faboideae
- Genus: Sphaerolobium
- Species: S. nudiflorum

Binomial name
- Sphaerolobium nudiflorum (Meisn.) Benth.

= Sphaerolobium nudiflorum =

Species of legume

Sphaerolobium nudiflorum is a species of flowering plant in the family Fabaceae and is endemic to the south-west of Western Australia. It is a shrub that typically grows to a height of 15–60 cm (5.9–23.6 in) and has yellow or orange flowers from October to January. It was first formally described in 1844 by Carl Meissner who gave it the name Roea nudiflora in Lehmann's Plantae Preissianae. In 1864, George Bentham changed the name to Sphaerolobium nudiflorum in Flora Australiensis The specific epithet (nudiflorum) means "bare-flowered".

This pea grows on flats and granite hills in the Esperance Plains, Jarrah Forest and Warren bioregions of south-western Western Australia and is listed as "not threatened" by the Government of Western Australia Department of Biodiversity, Conservation and Attractions.
