= Annals of Botany =

Scientific journal devoted to plant biology

- Discipline: Botany
- Language: English
- Edited by: Rowan Sage

Publication details
- History: 1887–present
- Publisher: Oxford University Press (United Kingdom)
- Frequency: Monthly
- Impact factor: 5.040 (2021)

Standard abbreviations
- ISO 4: Ann. Bot.

Indexing
- ISSN: 0305-7364 (print); 1095-8290 (web)
- LCCN: 23015643
- OCLC no.: 611985336

Links
- Journal homepage

Annals of Botany is a monthly peer-reviewed scientific journal publishing experimental, theoretical and applied papers on all aspects of plant biology. As of 2024, the Chief Editor is Rowan Sage. The journal is owned and managed by the Annals of Botany Company, a non-profit educational charity registered with the Charity Commission for England and Wales. It is published monthly through Oxford University Press in paper form and online, and is paid for primarily by institutional annual subscriptions. Regular extra issues, published free-of-charge, focus on topical themes. The journal does not levy page charges but authors may choose to pay a standard fee to secure open access status for their papers. According to Journal Citation Reports, in 2019 (published 2020) Annals of Botany’s impact factor was 4.005 and was ranked 27th out of 234 journals in the Plant Sciences category. The Journal's Eigenfactor was 0.01652, its H-Index 165 and the SCImago score 1.615. Also owned by the educational charity, Annals of Botany has two sister journals, AoB Plants, an online only open access botanical journal and in silico PLANTS, an online open access journal devoted to plant modelling. It is also closely associated with the informal online plant science publication Botany One.

== History ==
Annals of Botany was established in 1887 by Isaac Bayley Balfour (Sir Isaac from 1920) and Sydney Howard Vines with support from eight other prominent botanists of the time including Sir Francis Darwin and William Turner Thiselton-Dyer (Sir William from 1899). An extensive collection of letters, minutes and accounts covering the first 125 years of the Journal's existence has been archived as the Annals of Botany Papers at the Royal Botanic Gardens, Kew. A two-part history has been published based on this archive. Former Chief Editors (or equivalent) and their sometimes overlapping periods of office are as follows:

- Sydney Howard Vines FRS, 1887–1900;
- Dunkinfield Henry Scott FRS, 1900–1912;
- Sir John Bretland Farmer FRS, 1912–1921;
- Vernon Herbert Blackman FRS, 1921–1947;
- William Harold Pearsall FRS 1948–1964;
- John (Jack) Heslop-Harrison FRS, 1961–1967;
- James Frederick Sutcliffe, 1967–1983;
- John A. Bryant, 1983–1984;
- John Anthony Abbott, 1983–1984;
- David Frederick Cutler, 1984-1990;
- Roderick Hunt, 1990–1996;
- Michael Barson Jackson, 1996–2008;
- John Seymour (Pat) Heslop-Harrison, 2008–2020.

There was an earlier periodical Annals of Botany edited by Carl Dietrich Eberhard König (Charles Konig) and John Sims which started in 1804 and published two volumes before ceasing.
