= Lisa Ainsworth =

American molecular biologist

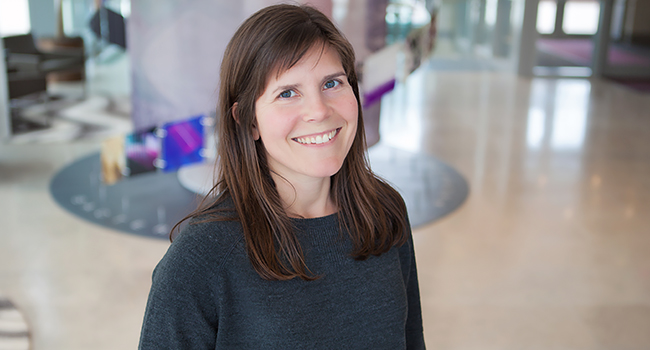
- Ainsworth in 2015, U.S. Department of Agriculture Agricultural Research Service photo
- Born: Elizabeth Anna Ainsworth
- Education: University of California, Los Angeles (BS); University of Illinois at Urbana Champaign (PhD)
- Scientific career
- Institutions: University of Illinois at Urbana–Champaign
- Thesis: Intraspecific, Interspecific, and Seasonal Variation in Acclimation of Photosynthesis to Rising Atmospheric Carbon Dioxide Concentration (2003)
- Doctoral advisor: Stephen P. Long
- Website: lab.igb.illinois.edu/ainsworth/lisa-ainsworth

Elizabeth Anna Ainsworth (commonly identified as Lisa Ainsworth) is an American plant physiologist currently employed by the University of Illinois at Urbana-Champaign. She previously worked for the United States Department of Agriculture (USDA) Agricultural Research Service (ARS). She is a Fellow of the American Association for the Advancement of Science (AAAS) and was awarded the 2018 Crop Science Society of America Presidential Award. She is known for researching the effects of atmospheric pollutants, including ozone and carbon dioxide, on the productivity of selected major crops such as corn and soybeans.

A highly influential researcher, Ainsworth was ranked in the top 1% by citations for her field in 2016, 2017, 2018, 2019, and 2022.

== Early life and education ==
Ainsworth grew up in small town Illinois, United States where she worked for her family's seed corn company. Ainsworth earned a bachelor's degree at the University of California, Los Angeles. Here she became interested in plant sciences and ecology, and spent two semesters completing field work in Costa Rica and Thailand. Ainsworth was inspired by her first measurements of photosynthesis to dedicate her research career to plant biology. She was a doctoral student under the supervision of Stephen P. Long at the University of Illinois at Urbana–Champaign, before spending a year as a Humboldt Fellow at Juelich Research Center.

== Research and career ==
Ainsworth is a professor of Crop Sciences and of Plant Biology at the University of Illinois at Urbana–Champaign. Previously, she was a plant physiologist at the United States Department of Agriculture Agricultural Research Service with the Global Change and Photosynthesis Research Unit. Her research was among the first to make use of biochemical and genomic tools to establish the mechanisms by which plants respond to climate change. In particular, Ainsworth studies how rising levels of carbon dioxide and ground level ozone impact crop production. At the University of Illinois at Urbana–Champaign Ainsworth is a lead investigator of SoyFACE (Free Air Concentration Enrichment). As part of SoyFACE Ainsworth leads an open-air laboratory that allows her to grow plants in atmospheric conditions that are similar to those predicted to be present in 2050. These experiments provide critical ground-truth data for models of future crop productivity and food security.

SoyFACE is a multi-faceted facility that develops methods for studying crop responses to global atmospheric and climate change in the field. The focal crops have been soybean and maize. Ainsworth has quantified genetic variation in crop responses to rising carbon dioxide and ozone pollution and has developed high-throughput DNA phenotyping to understand the genes and networks of genes responsible for ozone sensitivity. This allows her to establish the genetic changes that occur in plants due to climate change, as well as monitoring which plant species survive best in an effort to breed more ozone-tolerant varieties. She showed that during the 2010s a large proportion of the United States soybean and corn harvest has been lost to ozone pollution. She estimates that current ozone levels decrease corn yields by up to 10%, which is comparable to the amount lost to drought, flooding or pests. In 2011 Ainsworth identified that future levels of ground-level ozone could reduce the yields of soybeans by almost one quarter by 2050.

=== Academic service ===
Alongside her academic career, Ainsworth is involved with initiatives to increase the representation of women in science. She has led summer camps for high school girls (Pollen Power) to teach young people about plant science and the Earth's future climate. She is involved with the Plantae Women in Plant Biology network.

=== Awards and honours ===
Her awards and honours include:

- 2009 USDA ARS Midwest Area Early Career Research Scientist of the Year
- 2011 Society for Experimental Biology President's Medal
- 2012 American Society of Plant Biologists Charles Albert Shull Award
- 2012 University of Illinois at Urbana–Champaign University Scholar
- 2015 United States Department of Agriculture Agricultural Research Service Diversity & Equal Opportunity Award
- 2018 Crop Science Society of America Presidential Award
- 2019 National Academy of Sciences Prize in Food & Agricultural Sciences
- 2019 Elected Fellow of the American Association for the Advancement of Science
- 2020 Elected member of the National Academy of Sciences
