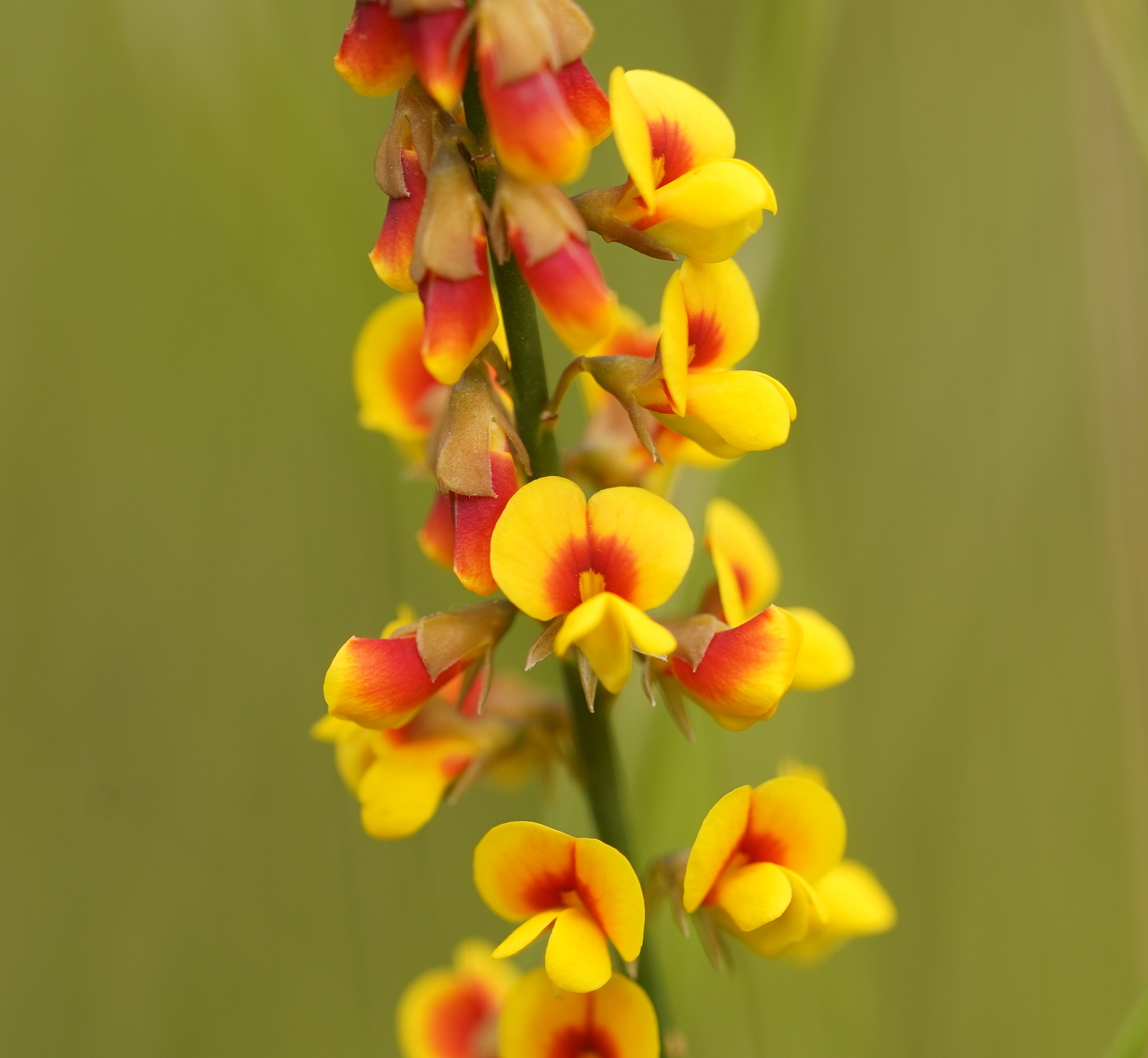
- In the Bunyip State Park

Scientific classification
- Kingdom: Plantae
- Clade: Tracheophytes
- Clade: Angiosperms
- Clade: Eudicots
- Clade: Rosids
- Order: Fabales
- Family: Fabaceae
- Subfamily: Faboideae
- Genus: Sphaerolobium
- Species: S. minus

Binomial name
- Sphaerolobium minus Crisp

= Sphaerolobium minus =

Species of flowering plant

Sphaerolobium minus, commonly known as globe-pea, is a species of flowering plant in the family Fabaceae and is endemic to south-eastern Australia. It is an erect, rush-like, mostly leafless shrub with yellow and reddish flowers arranged in small groups along the stems.

== Description ==
Sphaerolobium minus is an erect, rush-like shrub that typically grows to a height of up to about 50 cm (20 in) and has glabrous branchlets. It is mostly leafless, but when present, the leaves are scattered, linear to lance-shaped and about 5 mm (0.20 in) long. The flowers are arranged in small groups along the branches on a peduncle about 0.5 mm (0.020 in) long, each flower on a pedicel 1–3 mm (0.039–0.118 in) long with egg-shaped bracts, and bracteoles at the base of the sepals. The sepals are dark grey, 3–4 mm (0.12–0.16 in) long and joined at the base, with overlapping lobes, the two upper lobes forming a wedge-shaped "lip". The standard petal is broadly egg-shaped with a notched tip, 5–6 mm (0.20–0.24 in) long and yellow with reddish markings, the wings and keel about the same length as each other. Flowering occurs from September to December and the fruit is an inflated, spherical pod 3–5 mm (0.12–0.20 in) in diameter.

== Taxonomy and naming ==
Sphaerolobium minus was first formally described in 1805 by Jacques Labillardière in hisNovae Hollandiae Plantarum Specimen. The specific epithet (minus) means "smaller".

== Distribution and habitat ==
Globe-pea usually grows in wet heath, sometimes in the understorey of forest and is widely distributed along the coast and nearby ranges of south-east Queensland, eastern New South Wales, higher rainfall parts of southern Victoria, west to the Eyre Peninsula in South Australia and south to Tasmania.
