= Global Change Biology =

- Discipline: Conservation biology, ecology, marine biology, botany, environmental science
- Language: English
- Edited by: Danielle Way

Publication details
- History: Since 1995
- Publisher: Wiley-Blackwell
- Frequency: Monthly
- Open access: Hybrid
- Impact factor: 12.5 (2025)

Standard abbreviations
- ISO 4: Glob. Change Biol.

Indexing
- ISSN: 1354-1013 (print); 1365-2486 (web)
- LCCN: 97652851
- OCLC no.: 858340361

Links
- Journal homepage; Online access; Online archive

Global Change Biology is a biweekly peer-reviewed scientific journal covering research on the interface between biological systems and all aspects of environmental change that affect a substantial part of the globe including climate change, global warming, land use change, invasive species, urbanization, wildfire, and greenhouse gases. The journal was established by former editor-in-chief Stephen P. Long (University of Illinois and Lancaster University). Danielle Way was appointed editor-in-chief in 2025.

The journal has two sister journals: GCB Bioenergy and Global Change Biology Communications.
