= Control by deprivation =

Control deprivation is the act of not giving an individual their desires, wants and needs in a deliberate way to control that individual. It is often achieved through acts such as lacking affection, acting indifferent and detached, failing to respond, emotional distance, deliberately withholding sex, shifting blame to the individual, and by other techniques. Control deprivation can lead to a wide range of effects, such as causing depression, leading people to aggression, increased social class effects and the use of social stereotypes in making judgements on people as well as product acquisition.

Lack of control over a situation can significantly affect a person, changing the way a person thinks and acts. This is often exploited by individuals, businesses and in other situations, however individuals are also very capable of finding alternative means to regain the control that was previously lost and regaining personal control.

== Definition ==
Control is the ability to influence and direct behaviour or events, while deprive is to stop and prevent something from happening. Control deprivation is for an individual to use their power and influence to prevent an action that will give another individual joy, whether this action is emotional, physical or any other action.

== Effects of control deprivation ==
=== Effects on depression ===
Systematic control deprivation can lead to depressive disorders. A study highlighted how "Parental Affection-less control" was one of the factors that lead to depression later on in life. Using 125 patients that have been classified suffering from depressive symptoms under DSM-III, as well as suffering from one highly controlling parent and one parent low care parent. The results of this study show that people with depression are more likely to have seen themselves as having over-controlling parents. These effects of Psychological abuse from an elder can lead to feelings of guilt, separation, fear and anxiety. Further the studies into Learned Helplessness reveal that in both animals and humans when submitted to unavoidable pain eventually became "normalised" to the pain, even when given the opportunity to avoid the pain. Through the lack of control that the subject is submitted to they develop depression like symptoms. The direct lack of control that an individual experiences, can directly links and cause lowered self esteem, anxiety and a lack of motivation to change the situation that they are currently in. All of these symptoms are often characterised and found in people with depressive disorders.

Control deprivation can make the feelings of helplessness worse and exacerbate these feelings. The lack of control will may result in the individuals feeling more depressed and can change the emotional thought process of the individual, resulting in a negative mood. These feelings stem from uncontrollability that control deprivation brings into someones life can trigger the symptoms of depression and that of learned helplessness as a result of the control deprivation.

=== Social effects ===
Research has demonstrated that individuals that have suffered from Control Deprivation are more likely to use negative social stereotypes and connotations when making judgements on individuals after having been deprived control. When subjects were asked to describe an individual the subject was more likely to use negative social stereotypes when describing certain people and jobs that can be considered of lower socio-economic class jobs. In a set of studies, subjects were asked to describe a comedian and an archivist, one set of people were subject to a scenario where they were control deprived, this treatment group where more likely to describe the archivist in a negative manner relative to the control group. This causes particular issues through racial stereotyping as well as social-class effects. Studies have highlighted how institutionalised stereotypes within social classes may be exaggerated through lack of control as well as further straining the relationships between social classes highlighting that the desire for control may lead worsened social settings.

Ostracism is strongly linked to control deprivation due to humans desire for companionship and friendship. Using ostracism to be able to control for control deprivation a study found that when people have the opportunity to be aggressive to the people that ostracised them they will be. The study allowed the subjects to give hot sauce to the people that ostracised them, these subjects gave 4 times the amount of hot-sauce then the individuals in the control group. A lack of control has been proven to be related to aggression, this is theorised as people may become more aggressive to regain the freedom and control that they had lost or as a method to release frustration. Individuals will use aggression as a method to restore their personal sense of power. By allowing the subjects to give out hot sauce, the amount of hot sauce given out can be seen as acting out in an aggressive and frustrated manner, both with the intention to spite the individual that subjected them to a situation where they lacked control as well as to personally feel as if they are able to regain the control that they had lost. Ostracism may directly cause these affects that will lead to aggression due to the lack of control. This is further similarly linked to Frustration-aggression hypothesis.

=== Information processing ===
When deprived of control an individual will process information in a more systematic manner. Through giving subjects unsolvable problems to create a control deprived situation, followed by needing to pair words from sentences after a waiting period. Subjects from the experimental group were able to better recognise previously paired sentences as well as facts and make judgements on texts. The authors explore that these results highlight that failing to control outcomes is a built-in danger signal leading to a greater focus. The discussion moves onto these implications in motivation tools and how to "get the most" out of someone. Through the use of paired sentences the study was able to show that the subject takes in the information when encoding the information during the time that they are control deprived, they are not forming the links between the sentences when recalling the information. However other studies have conflicting measurements, in another study subjects were given zero, one, two, four, six or eight either solvable or unsolvable tasks then told to complete a two letter cancelation test. This study found that the subjects had increased motivation to complete the tasks, however the accuracy of the tasks completed fell. The author discusses how these results may be caused by learned helplessness, which describes how mental disorders such as Major depressive disorder can be caused by control deprivation.

=== Product acquisition ===
People more strongly linked to situations where they are able to feel stronger connected and influenced. These feelings are compounded when people are suffering from control deprivation. In line with the compensatory control theory, individuals will resort to a wide range of strategies to regain control. These strategies do not have to be linked to the source of the control deprivation. Individuals will aim to complete different or unrelated tasks that the individual is able to gain control over. A study where subjects were asked to complete simple meaningless tasks of deciphering a stimuli within visual noise allowed the subjects to regain control through completing simple tasks that give a reliable and desired outcome that reaffirms a level of control that was previously missing. This is hypothesised to be effective in restoring mental strength as it provides evidence to the individual that they are able to influence the world around them and that they do have an intrinsic level of control and belonging. As a direct result individuals are more likely to purchase and consume products that link to their intrinsic need for control. The study, conducted by Charlene Y Chen, Leonard Lee and Andy J Yap focuses on how control deprivation can be used to entice the subjects to purchase products. Through the running of multiple experiments, the study found that individuals after being submitted to a control deprived situation are more likely to purchase a utilitarian products over a hedonic product, this is hypothesised to be a method to be able to regain the control that had been lost through being deprived, with the utilitarian product being picked to represent more control that is missing as well as the long term use and effectiveness of these products However this study fails too make a decision on if the purchase of these problems does actually allow the consumer to fell as if they have gained control.

Individuals with higher self control are less economically drawn to the purchase of these products. Individuals where they both feel to be in more significant and stronger control are less likely to consume goods without a sense of need. Showing that as the amount of personal self control depreciates the desire to consume and will compensatory consume goods. This shows how advertisers and advertising will aim to capture these elements to appeal to there market.

=== Styles of thinking within cultures ===
Different cultures in still different ways of thinking about issues, East Asian people through cultural factors and education favour thinking in holistic manners, while people raised in Western Countries are more likely to have an analytical style of thinking. In brief settings of control deprivation East Asian subjects were more likely to shift towards and analytical style of thinking, this is paired with Caucasian subjects also continued to think in an analytic manner studies show. However, after persistent control deprivation the thought process changes. After pro-longed periods of control deprivation the thought process of the individuals from East Asian countries returns to the largely holistic thought processes. The thought process is not dependent on static outcomes of cultural influences but change and are flexible towards the current situations such as submitted to control deprivation

== Overcoming control deprivation ==
John Mirowsky proposed that problem solving can significantly improve the feelings of control that an individual feels. This is backed up by the studies conducted by Bukowski, after submitting the subjects to unsolvable tasks followed by solvable tasks, these subjects were able to quickly restore their sense of control. As Mirowsky states that people with perceived higher control of their lives are more likely reflect their life constraints and opportunities, the sense of control increases with education, wealth and status of employment. All these factors show that an increase in activity that relates to problem solving and results in a "sense of achievement" help to overcome the feelings of control deprivation. However, in the same vain, research has shown that small experiences of lacking control can increase the motivation and increase the effort expenditure to get out of those situations. Through this restoring of control individuals will have had there cognitive ability boosted.

== Uses in torture ==
Control deprivation has been used by the CIA, and described in the CIA interrogation manuals, under the detention section the manual says they can deprive the prisoner of sleep, wood, water as well as depriving individuals of sensory stimuli, can be effective in getting the information out of individuals.
