= Frustration–aggression hypothesis =

Theory of aggression

The frustration–aggression hypothesis, also known as the frustration–aggression–displacement theory, is a theory of aggression proposed by John Dollard, Neal Miller, Leonard Doob, Orval Mowrer, and Robert Sears in 1939, and further developed by Neal Miller in 1941 and Leonard Berkowitz in 1989. The theory says that aggression is the result of blocking, or frustrating, a person's efforts to attain a goal.

When first formulated, the hypothesis stated that frustration always precedes aggression, and aggression is the sure consequence of frustration. Two years later, however, Miller and Sears re-formulated the hypothesis to suggest that while frustration creates a need to respond, some form of aggression is one possible outcome. Therefore, the re-formulated hypothesis stated that while frustration prompts a behavior that may or may not be aggressive, any aggressive behavior is the result of frustration, making frustration not sufficient, but a necessary condition for aggression.

The hypothesis attempts to explain why people scapegoat. It attempts to give an explanation as to the cause of violence. According to Dollard and colleagues, frustration is the "condition which exists when a goal-response suffers interference", while aggression is defined as "an act whose goal-response is injury to an organism (or an organism surrogate)". The theory says that frustration causes aggression, but when the source of the frustration cannot be challenged, the aggression gets displaced onto an innocent target. For example, if a man is disrespected and humiliated at his work, but cannot respond to this for fear of losing his job, he may go home and take his anger and frustration out on his family. This theory is also used to explain riots and revolutions, both of which are believed to be caused by poorer and more deprived sections of society who may express their bottled up frustration and anger through violence.

While some researchers criticized the hypothesis and proposed moderating factors between frustration and aggression, several empirical studies were able to confirm it as is. In 1989, Berkowitz expanded on the hypothesis by suggesting that negative affect and personal attributions play a major role in whether frustration instigates aggressive behavior.

== History ==
The frustration–aggression hypothesis emerged in 1939 through the form of a monograph published by the Yale University Institute of Human Relations. The Yale psychologists behind the monograph were John Dollard, Leonard Doob, Neal Miller, O. H Mowrer, and Robert Sears. The book is based on many studies conducted by the group that touched a variety of disciplines including psychology, anthropology and sociology. Marxism, psychoanalysis and behaviorism were used by the Yale group throughout their research. Their work, Frustration and Aggression (1939), was soon having repercussions on the explanation of aggressive behavior theories. Their theory applied to human beings, but also to animals. The book created controversy on the subject which led to more than seven articles critiquing the new theory. The Psychological Review and the Reading in Social Psychology are two of the papers that published articles on the subject. Many social scientists disclaimed the rather strict definition of frustration reactions as well as how the frustration concept is defined in itself. By 1941, the Yale group modified their theory following the multiple critics and studies published by other psychologists. From there, many pioneers in the social science world modified and brought their knowledge to the original theory.

In 1989 Berkowitz published an article, Frustration–Aggression Hypothesis: Examination and Reformulation, which addressed the inconsistency of empirical studies aiming to test the hypothesis, as well as its criticism. He proposed a modification to the hypothesis that would take into an account negative affect and individual attributions. More recently, Breuer and Elson published a comprehensive overview of the Frustration–Aggression Theory. The authors stated that despite an ample amount of empirical research that examines the link between frustration and aggressive behaviors, there is a decline in the number of studies that specifically refers to the frustration–aggression hypothesis. Breuer and Elson propose that there is utility in using the frustration–aggression hypothesis as a theoretical foundation for aggression literature and that this theory may have novel applications for other areas such as media psychology.

== Reformulation and additions to the hypothesis ==
In 1941, the Yale group clarified their original statement which was "that the occurrence of aggressive behavior always presuppose the existence of frustration and, contrariwise, that the existence of frustration always lead to some form of aggression". As it was, the second part of this hypothesis lead readers to think that frustration could only have aggression as a consequence, and it did not allow the possibility that other responses could arise and override the aggression response. The Yale group thus reformulated the hypothesis as following: "frustration produces instigation to a number of different types of response, one of which is aggression". With this new formulation, the researchers left more place for the idea that aggressive impulses are not the only kinds that can emerge when an individual feels frustration. Other impulses, such as fear of punishment, can outweigh or even attenuate aggression instigations until it disappears, which would explain situations where frustration does not lead to outright aggression.

In his article published in 1941, Gregory Bateson observed the frustration–aggression hypothesis under a cultural angle. According to him, culture was implicitly involved in the hypothesis itself, as it was dealing with human behaviour, which is always formed and influenced by the environment, be it social or cultural. He stated that it is easier to fit the hypothesis in people whose culture portray life as series of neutral or frustrating events that lead to satisfying ends. This would be the case for European culture and for Iatmul culture. However, it is harder to apply the hypothesis to the Balinese culture. Indeed, Balinese children are taught to take pleasure, satisfaction, in the steps that lead to their goals, without waiting for satisfaction climaxes by completion of such goals. Following the same line of thoughts, Arthur R. Cohen considered social norms to be an important factor in whether or not aggression will be following frustration. In 1955, he published results of a study he conducted, which included 60 female students, that showed that people were less likely to demonstrate aggression when social standards were stressed. Moreover, he built on what Doob and Sears' study previously claimed, which is that demonstration of aggressive behavior will depend on the anticipation of punishment. Indeed, Cohen's result showed that people were less likely to demonstrate aggression towards the frustration agent if the latter was an authoritative figure. He also investigated Nicholas Pastore's statement that aggression was more likely to follow in a context of an arbitrary context when compared to a non-arbitrary one, and reached the same conclusions.

=== Justification factor ===
The frustration–aggression theory has been studied since 1939, and there have been modifications. Dill and Anderson conducted a study investigating whether hostile aggression differs in justified vs. unjustified frustration conditions—compared to the control condition which would not induce frustration. The study task required participants to learn and make an origami bird. The experimental procedure comprised an instruction phase and a folding phase. During the instruction phase, a participant paired with a confederate was shown how to fold a bird only one time. The folding phase was timed and each subject was required to make the bird alone as quickly and as accurately as possible. In all conditions, the experimenter started presenting the instructions in a deliberately fast manner. The conditions differed on how the experimenter responded to the confederate's request to slow down. In the non-frustration control condition, the experimenter apologized and slowed down. In the unjustified frustration condition, the experimenter revealed his desire to leave as quickly as possible for personal reasons. In the justified frustration condition, the experimenter revealed a need to clear the room as fast as possible due to the supervisor demand. The subjects were then given questionnaires on their levels of aggression as well as questionnaires about the competence of the research staff. They were told that these questionnaires would determine whether the research staff would receive financial aid, or verbal reprimands and a reduction in financial awards. The questions presented on the questionnaire were designed to reflect the research staff's competence and likability. Dill and Anderson found that participants in the unjustified frustration condition rated the research staff as less able and less likable, knowing this would affect their financial situation as graduate students. The justified frustration group rated the staff as less likable and less competent than the control group, but higher on both rating scales than the unjustified condition participants. The authors concluded that unjustified frustration leads to greater level of aggression, compared to justified frustration, which, in turn, results in higher levels of aggression compared to the non-frustration situations.

=== Reformulation by Leonard Berkowitz ===
In 1964, Leonard Berkowitz stated that it is necessary to have an aggression stimulus to make aggression take place. Then in 1974 and 1993, he remodified the frustration/aggression hypothesis into a theory that removed the importance of aggressive cues to the aggressive behavior. Which is to say, an extremely angry subject will show aggression even if the aggression cue is absent. The most provocative theory introduced by Berkowitz is his "aggressive cues" hypothesis, stating that for young children, previous exposure to any objects or events such as military weapon toys showing destruction effects will work as aggressive cues to increase the chances of aggression behaviors. The modification of frustration/aggression hypothesis by Berkowitz discussed that the aggressive behavior originates from internal forces such as anger, aggressive habits and external stimuli. These theories help explain the reasons why aggression is evoked, but did not explain well the procedure of aggressive habits developments into aggressive stimuli.

In his article published in 1980, Leonard Berkowitz further discussed the relationship between the frustration and the level of aggression by adding the differentiation between the internal and external reaction to the frustration. In his first part of experiment, he found that for both of the types of frustration (legitimate and illegitimate), compared to the control group which finished the task successfully, the internal reaction measured by heart rate and rating of three 21-step bipolar scales shows great level. Nevertheless, there is no significant difference of internal reaction between legitimate and illegitimate groups. For the second part of the experiment, when previous two groups experiencing legitimate and illegitimate frustration, encounter an innocent partner in order to perform an unrelated task, the group with previous illegitimate frustration shows greater external reaction which is openly punitive actions towards the innocent partner than the group experiencing previous legitimate frustration does.

=== Cognitive-consistency theory ===
Cognitive-consistency theories assume that "when two or more simultaneously active cognitive structures are logically inconsistent, arousal is increased, which activates processes with the expected consequence of increasing consistency and decreasing arousal." By defining frustration as arising from the perceived resistance to attain a certain goal, frustration can be conceptualized as arising from an inconsistency between a perceived situation and a desired, or expected, situation; that is, the availability of the preconditions required to be able to complete some internal response sequence. In this approach, aggressive behavior functions to forcefully manipulate the perception into matching the expected situation. Furthermore, this approach puts aggression in the broader context of inconsistency reduction, also involving fear and curiosity. Indeed, depending on the size of the inconsistency and the specific context, frustration has been suggested to also be one of the causing factors in both fear and curiosity, and Gray (1987; p. 205) even concluded that “fear and frustration are the same”.

== Neurobiological factors ==
Some studies have shown that frustrating and equally threatening events may generate feelings of aggression. This is based on the account that one of our neural systems is responsible for executing the basic responses to threat. It so happens that one of these basic responses from this system is that of aggression. The system is made up of and follows from the amygdala to the hypothalamus and finally to the periaqueductal gray matter (PAG) In greater detail, research suggests that when one is threatened or frustrated by some stimuli, parts of our frontal cortex, that is our orbital, medial and ventrolateral frontal cortex, is activated which works in tandem with our threat response system, the amygdala-hypothalamus-PAG. More simply put, threatening events generate more action potentials in the frontal cortex regions which then relay onto the amygdala-hypothalamus-PAG. It is in this basic threat response system where the decision on which response should take hold based on the information received from the frontal cortex regions. As mentioned, there are varying degrees and responses that could take hold within an animal in the presence of a frustrating event. This has not shown to interfere with the basic circuitry at the neuronal level and simply implies that certain stimuli generate more action potentials than others, and thus stronger responses than others respectively. In the face of this, animals portray a response hierarchy at the onset of a frustrating event. For example, when low levels of danger are perceived, the threat response system induces freezing in the animal; closer subjects of threat generate the act of fleeing from their surroundings and finally, where the source of the threat is so close that escape is no longer an option, the threat circuitry system will induce reactive aggression in the animal. What this means is that the closer a frustrating stimulus is presented to us, the greater the chances our basic response systems will be activated and thus will give rise to certain behaviors accordingly. Furthermore, some research has shown that "individuals with elevated susceptibility for frustration [showed] greater activity within these regions [amygdala-hypothalarmus-PAG] in response to frustrating events relative to those with less susceptibility". What this research suggests is that people who get frustrated more easily than others show greater activity in the frontal cortex in connection with the amygdala-hypothalamus-PAG, the system that makes us act, given a strong enough stimulus, aggressively with reference to the studies at hand.

== Empirical studies ==
One study by Williams examined the impact of violent content and frustration with game-play and assessed how these factors are related to aggressive personality (i.e., trait hostility). His study collected data from 150 male college undergraduates. The study consisted of two phases. The first phase lasted 45 minutes and was in a large group setting. During this phase participants were asked to complete a series of questionnaires that assessed their video game playing habits and aggression. The second phase was a one-on-one session with each participant. During this phase participants played video games and were assigned to one of four conditions: 1) video game with violent content in low/non-frustrating mode, 2) video game with violent content in frustrating mode, 3) video game with nonviolent content in low/non-frustrating mode, and 4) video game with nonviolent content in frustration mode. As part of the frustrating conditions, participants were informed that their scores would be compared to other participants and that higher performance would be rewarded with a $100 gift card. Afterwards, participants completed a questionnaire similar to phase one. Ultimately, this study found that exposure to violent content influenced participants' aggressive responses when playing video games. He also found that frustration with gameplay was just as impactful, if not greater, on participants' aggressive responses. Participants who were exposed to violent content and presented frustration with game-play reported the highest scores in trait hostility.

Another study by Shackman and Pollak tested the impact of physical maltreatment of children on their reactive aggression. The authors tested the relationships between individual differences in social information processing, history of physical maltreatment, and child negative affect and their aggressive behaviors. The study collected data from 50 boys through the Madison, Wisconsin Public Schools. Within this sample, 17 children had a history of physical maltreatment. Families attended two separate sessions in the laboratory. The first session involved the children completing an emotional oddball task while having their neural responses recorded via event-related potentials (ERPs). After this task, parents and children participated in a semistructured dyadic interaction, which involved the researchers assessment of child-directed parental hostility during a 10-minute interaction. Families then returned to the laboratory between 2 and 20 days for the second session of the experiment. The second session asked children to participate in a provocation task, which was designed to evoke a reactive aggression response. All families were paid $50 for their participation and were debriefed. The authors reported that physically maltreated children displayed greater negative affect and aggressive behavior compared to children that were not physically maltreated. This relationship was mediated by the children's attention to angry faces, as measured by the ERP. Ultimately, these findings suggest that physical maltreatment of children leads to child dysregulation of their negative affect and aggression.

== Criticism ==
The publication of Frustration and Aggression gave rise to criticism from several scientists, including animal behaviorists, psychologists, and psychiatrists. For example, Seward, who studied rat behavior, suggested that aggression can also be caused by dominance struggles, which for him were different from frustration. Durbin and Bowlby, by observing apes and children, placed reasons for the breaking out of a fight into three different categories. While one of the categories was frustration, the other two were classified as possession disputes and resentment of a stranger intrusion. Addressing this criticism, Berkowitz suggested that the controversy around the frustration–aggression hypothesis has its roots in the lack of a common definition for frustration. He advocated that if frustration is defined as a reaction to a blocking of a drive or an interruption of some internal response sequence, those various reasons for aggression actually fall under the frustration umbrella.

Later research was focused more on refining the hypothesis, rather than on denying its correctness. In one of the earlier studies, following the publication of Dollard et al.'s book, Pastore argued that the hypothesis should distinguish between arbitrary and non-arbitrary situations, as non-arbitrary situations decrease the aggressiveness of response. In this study, participants from a sample of 131 college students were presented with the verbal description of two types of situations, arbitrary and non-arbitrary. One of the arbitrary situation examples was being intentionally passed by the bus driver, while waiting at the correct bus stops. A non-arbitrary situation was described in one of the examples as being passed by the bus, while it was specifically marked as heading for a garage. The study results suggested that arbitrariness of the situation is an important factor in eliciting aggressive behavior in frustrating situations, with arbitrary situations inducing more aggression.

Building on Pastore's work, in his 1955 empirical study, Cohen confirmed that the arbitrariness of a situation affects the level of aggressiveness. However, the study also supported his hypothesis that two more factors need to be accounted for in the frustration–aggression hypothesis. Those factors are social norms and the relationship with the frustrating agent. In his study, 60 volunteer participants were rating 14 statements on the levels of predicted aggressiveness. Cohen found that people tend to respond less aggressively if the frustrating agent is an authority figure, rather than a friend and that people respond to frustration with less aggression if the socially accepted norms require to do so. Berkowitz addressed this criticism in his 1989 article and proposed that frustration, and ultimately aggression, is induced when individuals think they have been deliberately and wrongly kept from their goal.

Some sources suggest that there is little empirical support for it, even though researchers have studied it for more than sixty years. Also, this theory suggests frustrated, prejudiced individuals should act more aggressively towards out-groups they are prejudiced against, but studies have shown that they are more aggressive towards everyone.

The frustration–aggression hypothesis implies that aggression is followed or triggered by a feeling of frustration as proposed by the Yale group. Yet, other studies support contradictory claims. Certain subjects in some studies have shown to not respond aggressively to frustration given their personal, moral and educational backgrounds. For instance, the Indian culture uses the Satyagraha, which means "non-violent resistance" to a trigger. Mahatma Gandhi exemplified this technique that essentially denounces the principles of the frustration–aggression theory in that he restrained himself from feeling these innate desires.

Indeed, the hypothesis does not take into consideration the individuality of human beings. According to Dixon and Johnson, two people can respond differently to the same frustration stimuli. For instance, some could respond aggressively while driving on the highway after being cut off by another car, whereas others with a different temperament could not react to it. However, the theory assumes that if two different people receive the same frustration stimuli, they will react similarly or equally aggressively.

The Yale group's hypothesis does not explain why aggressive behavior could be manifested in different social environments without previous provocation or feeling of frustration. However, according to Gross and Osterman, people may lose their sense of uniqueness in mass societal contexts because it tends to deindividuate them. For instance, individuals may behave aggressively when they are with their friends or in a big crowd (e.g. while watching a hockey game), but might not behave aggressively when they are by themselves (e.g. watching the game alone at home). When individuals are in a crowd, they are more likely to become desensitised of their own actions and less likely to take responsibility. This phenomenon is known as deindividuation.

== See also ==
- Cognitive dissonance
- Going postal
- Robert Richardson Sears
- Taylor Aggression Paradigm – measure of aggressive behaviour in humans
