= Weapons effect =

Psychological phenomenon

The weapons effect is a controversial theory described and debated in the scientific field of social psychology. It refers to the mere presence of a weapon or a picture of a weapon leading to more aggressive behavior in humans, particularly if these humans are already aroused. This should not be confused with the weapon focus, another social psychology finding. This effect was first described by Leonard Berkowitz and Anthony LePage in 1967 in their paper "Weapons as Aggressions-Eliciting Stimuli" in the Journal of Personality and Social Psychology. The paper outlines an experiment conducted by the authors at the University of Wisconsin. The researchers tested their hypothesis that stimuli commonly associated with aggression (like weapons) can elicit more aggressive responses from people "ready to act" aggressively.

Several psychology researchers have also criticized the concept of the weapons effect, questioning the original research study's findings because subsequent studies have been less successful at replicating the weapons effect, and alternative explanations have been proposed. For example, more recent research has proposed that there are more factors that influence aggression in a situation containing a weapon, such as an individual's familiarity with the weapons present.

As work with the weapons effect progressed, researchers also demonstrated the weapons priming effect. This variation refers to even weapon-related words leading to more aggressive behavior in humans.

== History ==
=== Original study ===
The original study design by Berkowitz and LePage is as follows: The researchers recruited 100 male university students for one in-laboratory session. The students were randomly assigned to receive either 1 shock or 7 shocks, and were told that these shocks came from a peer. Following this, the researchers gave the students the opportunity to administer as many shocks as they wanted to the peer. For about one third of the students, a rifle and revolver were on the table near the shock key; half of these participants were told the weapon belonged to the targeted peer and the other half of these participants were told the weapon did not belong to the targeted peer. For the other two thirds of participants, there was either nothing on the table near the shock key or there was 2 badminton rackets on the table near the shock key. The dependent variable, or outcome measure, was how many shocks the participant administered to the targeted peer.

The researchers found that the greatest number of shocks were administered by the students who had initially received 7 shocks and then were in the presence of the weapons, regardless of whether they were told the weapon belonged to the targeted peer or not. As such, the authors believe this was evidence for their original hypothesis that an aroused person would act more aggressively in the presence of weapons.

==== Replications and extensions ====
In 1975, Ann Frodi made an attempt to replicate the original weapons effect study cross-culturally in a Swedish population. She extended the work to examine other possible stimuli which may have aggressive-stimulating connotations or aggressive-inhibiting connotations. Frodi used a very similar research study design; with a 100 male high school students either heavily angered or not by whom they thought was a peer. Then, participants had the opportunity to administer shocks to this "peer" with either no weapons, weapons, or a baby-bottle (constructed as an aggressive-inhibiting stimuli) on the table near the shock key. Frodi found that the participants exposed to weapons administered the greatest amount of shocks, but unlike the original study Berkowitz and Page study, there was no significant difference in numbers of shocks administered between those who were angered and who were not. Also, Frodi did not find evidence for aggressive-inhibiting stimuli; that is, the control group (with no weapons) and the baby-bottle group did not significantly differ on the number of administered shocks.

In 1993, Arthur Kellermann and colleagues obtained data from police and medical examination records on risk factors in the home of occurring homicides. Information on control subjects (matched to be the same as homicide victims on sex, race, age range, and neighborhood) was also obtained. Using matched-pair methods, the researchers compared risk factors. The researchers found that keeping a gun in the home was strongly and independently related with homicide. However very few of the homicides involved household guns.

==== Weapons priming effect ====
In 1998, Craig Anderson and colleagues wanted to further test the mechanism behind the weapons effect. At the time, the current explanation for the weapons effect suggested priming, or that the cognitive identification of weapons automatically increased the accessibility of aggression related thoughts. Thus, the researchers tested if even weapon-related words or images would be followed by speedier oral reading of an aggressive (vs. nonaggressive) word. This was done in two experiments: the first experiment only manipulated weapon-related words in a group of 35 undergraduate students of mixed gender. That is, half the participants saw weapon-related words on what they thought was a computer reading task and the other half saw animal-related words (control). The second experiment manipulated weapon-related images in a group of 93 undergraduate students, with half the participants seeing images of weapons and the other half seeing images of plants. Results confirmed the weapons priming effect hypothesis; even just the presence of weapons-related words or images increased speed in reading of an aggressive word. In addition, the word-prime had a stronger effect than the image-prime.

In 2005, Bartholow and colleagues extended on the weapons priming effect by examining if individual differences in knowledge about guns predicted the strength of the weapons priming effect on aggression-related outcomes. To do this, the researchers conducted three experiments: (1) looking at emotional and cognitive reactions to visual gun cues in hunters (individuals with prior gun experience) and non-hunters, (2) examining reactions to pictures of different gun types (hunting firearms vs. assault firearms) in hunters and non-hunters, and (3) comparing differences in aggressive behavior following weapons primes with differences in emotional and cognitive responses to visual gun cues. Results expanded on the weapons priming effect, finding that hunters reacted to visual gun cues differently depending on the gun type. Also, individual differences in emotional and cognitive responses to gun cues were associated with individual differences in aggressive behavior following a weapons prime.

== Criticism ==
=== Weak evidence ===
Besides inspiring a number of replications and extensions, the weapons effect and Berkowitz and LePage’s original study has received major criticism. First, replications have not always found the weapons effect. In 1971, Ellis and colleagues gave 104 subjects the opportunity to shock a confederate (a research assistant who pretends to be another test subject) after receiving no shocks, 2 shocks, or 8 shocks from this confederate. This created angered and non-angered subjects. For some of the subjects weapons were present in the study room; furthermore, researchers told some of the subjects that the confederate was a policeman and researchers told the other group that the confederate was a student. This study did not find weapons to be aggression-eliciting stimuli, with no significant difference in the number of shocks administered among those who had a weapon in the study room and those who did not, regardless of level of shock originally received by the subject. When researchers told the subjects that the confederate was a student, the presence of weapons in the study room in combination with a subject that was not angered at the study onset, inhibited the number of shocks administered. Also, when researchers told the subjects that the confederate was a policeman, the presence of weapons in the study room in combination with a subject that was angered at the study onset, inhibited the amount of shocks the subject administered.

A 1971 study by Page and Scheidt also found that individual differences played a major role in whether or not the weapons effect would be found in a study. Individuals who were more sophisticated presented different data than less sophisticated individuals, or those who were experiencing evaluation apprehension. They also concluded that any weapons effect that was demonstrated could not be generalized outside of a laboratory setting.

Schmidt and Schmidt heavily criticized Berkowitz's theory of weapons as aggression-eliciting stimuli in their article Weapons as Aggression-Eliciting Stimuli: A Critical Inspection of Experimental Results. The authors examined the original weapons effect study and subsequent replications and failed replications, concluding that there was no experimental evidence of a cue-elicited weapons-effect on aggressive behavior. Instead, the authors attribute the occasional observed weapons effect to being a result of operant conditioning.

==== Reverse weapons effect ====
In 1991, Gary Kleck and Karen McElrath obtained archival data from 1979-1985 National Crime Surveys and the 1982 Supplementary Homicide Reports. The researchers wanted to examine the impact of firearms and other deadly weapons on: (1) the probability that threatening situations escalated to a physical attack, (2) the probability that injuries resulted from a physical attack, and (3) the probability that death resulted from a physical attack. Results were not consistent with the weapons effect. Instead, the researchers found that the presence of all types of deadly weapons was strongly associated with threatening situations that did escalate to a physical attack. In the case where there was a physical attack and the presence of a weapon, there was also less probability of injury. Yet, in the case where there was a physical attack, a weapon present, and an injury, there was an increased probability of death. Overall, this data suggests that the weapons effect (if there is indeed a weapons effect) is more nuanced than previously portrayed. Further, that the presence of guns may have had an inhibitory effect on physical violence.

Kleck continued with this line of research, and in 2001 published another study examining this opposition to the weapons effect. Again using archival data, Kleck found that guns have little do with the relative risk of homicide. In his discussion, he bid scholars to question the causal effect of the presence of weapons in the scene on the incidence of homicide.

While it is difficult to directly test the weapons effect in the real world, much of the available evidence would suggest that there are other underlying causes for the effects originally measured by Berkowitz and LePage.

== Real-world application ==
The weapons effect has implications for legal policy on gun control. For example, in a book chapter from Psychology and Social Policy, author Charles Turner proposes that policy recommendations aiming to minimize criminal violence need to take in account that the aggressive meaning people attach to firearms, in addition to the availability of firearms, has an important role in criminal violence. Yet, he also argues that the weapons effect can be mitigated. Nevertheless, with the mixed results and conclusions from weapons effect studies, it is not clear if this line of research will extend into support for or against gun control legislation.

Because of the nature of the weapons effect, it is impossible to directly test the original hypothesis in a real-world setting. While the attempts at replicating or even finding a weapons effect may be performed flawlessly, that does not necessarily mean that the results of these studies is applicable in the real world. An effect may have been found in many of these studies, but further research is necessary to determine the validity and replicability of these results.

== See also ==
- Leonard Berkowitz
- Weapon focus
- Aggression
- Social learning theory
