= Honor culture (Middle East) =

Social system

Honor culture in the Middle East refers to an underlying social system that shapes societal values in the region. Such honor cultures are defined by the relative importance attributed to social prestige and image, as well as the evaluation made by other individuals. Virtuous behavior, personality integrity, and good moral characteristics factor in this system. Likewise, the values of collective pride, social commitment, and men and women's honor are also features of an honor culture. This is contrasted with other societies where honor is perceived as an individual value and a personal matter, shaped by differing perspectives and commitments.

== Impacts ==
In the Middle East, social rewards, as an aspect of honor culture, may diminish the competitive aspirations of individuals.

In regions where governments cede control to tribes, violence associated with honor culture may appear implicitly condoned.

The impact of honor insults is linked to defensive reactions and coping mechanisms related to shame.

Honor culture in these societies also influences neighboring regions such as Turkey, and Sudan. Nevertheless, honor cultures may vary significantly from one another.

== Terminology ==
- Sharaf and ird (Bedouin)

== See also ==
- Culture of honor (Southern United States)
