= Taylor Aggression Paradigm =

- Purpose: measure aggressive behavior

The Taylor Aggression Paradigm (TAP; also commonly referred to as the Competitive Reaction Time Task) is a prominent, well-validated, laboratory analog measure of aggressive behavior in humans, predominantly utilized within the field of psychology.

== Purpose ==
The TAP is designed to objectively elicit and measure people's aggression in response to provocation from an opponent.

== Origin ==
At the time the TAP was developed, few laboratory measures of aggression existed. In the late 1950s to early 1960s the field of aggression research was focused on developing robust methods of measuring aggression in situ. The TAP was developed out of a need for a useful, easy to administer measure of aggression that elicits and captures aggressive behavior in response to provocation in the moment. The TAP was created by Dr. Stuart Preston Taylor during his time in graduate school at the University of Massachusetts where he was earning his PhD. It was published as a methodology in 1967 during Taylor's tenure at Kent State University. Contemporaries of the TAP included the Bobo-doll Modeling Task, the Teacher/Learner Task, and the Buss Aggression Machine.

== Design ==
At its core, the TAP in all its variations is an adversarial competition task. In the original task, participants select an intensity of electric shock to deliver to an opponent prior to competing on a test in which they had to flip a switch in response to a cue from a light (apparently assessing reaction time). The loser of the test received a shock predetermined by their opponent. This test was then repeated however many times to find consistent results.

In its current form, the TAP is a computerized task in which the participant competes against an ostensible opponent on a reactive time task incorporated within a computer program utilizing a keyboard. The participant competes against the ostensible opponent on a series of trials with each trial involving an iteration of a reaction time task or game. Commonly, one test session using the TAP will involve 10-40 trials or iterations of the reaction time game. Aggression is measured as the duration or severity of the noxious stimuli administered by the participant against the opponent. Further evolution of the design has seen the process by which this task is accomplished modified while staying true to this basic design. Since its earliest iteration as a series of lights and switches on a wooden box to current complex graphical user interfaces on computer screens, the basic design of the paradigm has stayed consistent.

A subsequent design improvement to the TAP allowed noxious stimuli delivered by the ostensible opponent to the participant to be grouped by level of provocation (allowing the researcher to manipulate provocation). Commonly, participants receive stimuli that are grouped as no provocation (not provoking whatsoever), low provocation, and high provocation. This allows researchers to differentiate participants’ responses by the level of perceived aggression they experienced and respond to. Currently, three different types of noxious stimuli are utilized in TAP research. These include electric shocks delivered via electrodes attached to a participant's hand, noise blasts delivered via headphones, or demeaning and hurtful messages delivered via text.

=== Variations ===
The TAP has been criticized for its lack of standardization because this can result in p-hacking.

==== mTAP ====
The modified Taylor Aggression Paradigm, or mTAP, as the most commonly used version of the TAP, has the participant competing against an ostensible opponent, as the two are never in the same room. This carries the advantage of not requiring the participation of a confederate. Furthermore, this modern version of the TAP often does not require the participant to preliminarily select a noxious stimulus to deliver before the interaction with the ostensible opponent. Instead, the participant selects a noxious stimulus after each “winning” trial or interaction to then be delivered to the ostensible opponent.

==== RCAP ====
The Response-Choice Aggression Paradigm or RCAP, is a modified version of the TAP that allows the participant to deliver a noxious stimulus on a predetermined range of intensity or the option to not retaliate at all.

==== TAP-Chat ====
The TAP-Chat is a modified version of the TAP utilized to assess cyber aggression. It resembles a virtual social gaming format in which during repetitive trials of the competitive reaction time task participants are able to "send" potentially derogatory "chats" to their ostensible opponents, rather than other noxious stimuli (e.g., electronic shocks or noise blasts) as in the original TAP. Participants' messages or "chats" to their opponents are coded for aggressive content.

=== Validation ===
The TAP has come under some criticism since its inception. These criticisms include its lack of ecological validity, the use of an authority figure (the experimenter) that sanctions the interaction, a narrow focus on physical, retaliatory aggression, and lack of alternative options other than to retaliate. In turn, the TAP has been validated in multiple studies as a psychometrically sound measure of aggressive behavior that has strong convergent validity, demonstrates discriminant validity, and external validity. Furthermore, a recent meta-analysis(p curve analysis) examined over 170 hypothesis tests utilizing the TAP and found that it exhibited significant reliability or evidentiary value.

== Research impact ==
The Taylor Aggression Paradigm has been consistently used in research since its inception over 50 years ago with over 909 citations in scientific literature through 2020. It has also inspired the development of other contemporary measures of aggression, many of which are attempts at improving upon the design constraints of the TAP. These include the Hot Sauce Paradigm, Point-Subtraction Aggression Paradigm, and the Fight or Escape Paradigm, as well as the Sexual Imposition Paradigm which drew conceptual design cues from the TAP.
