= Aggression =

Social interaction aiming at inflicting harm or unpleasantness

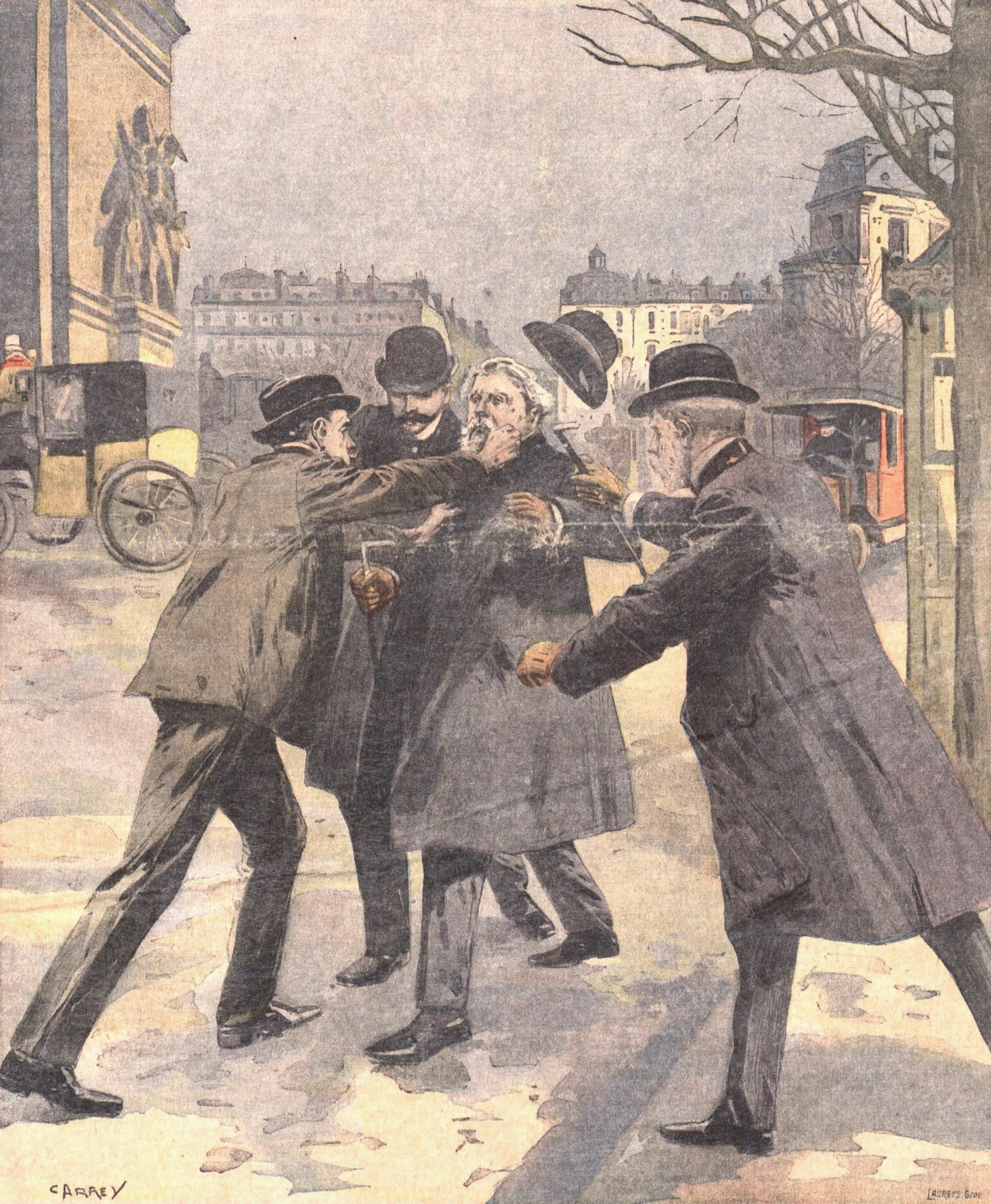
Depiction of French President Armand Fallieres's assault by a waiter named Jean Mattis

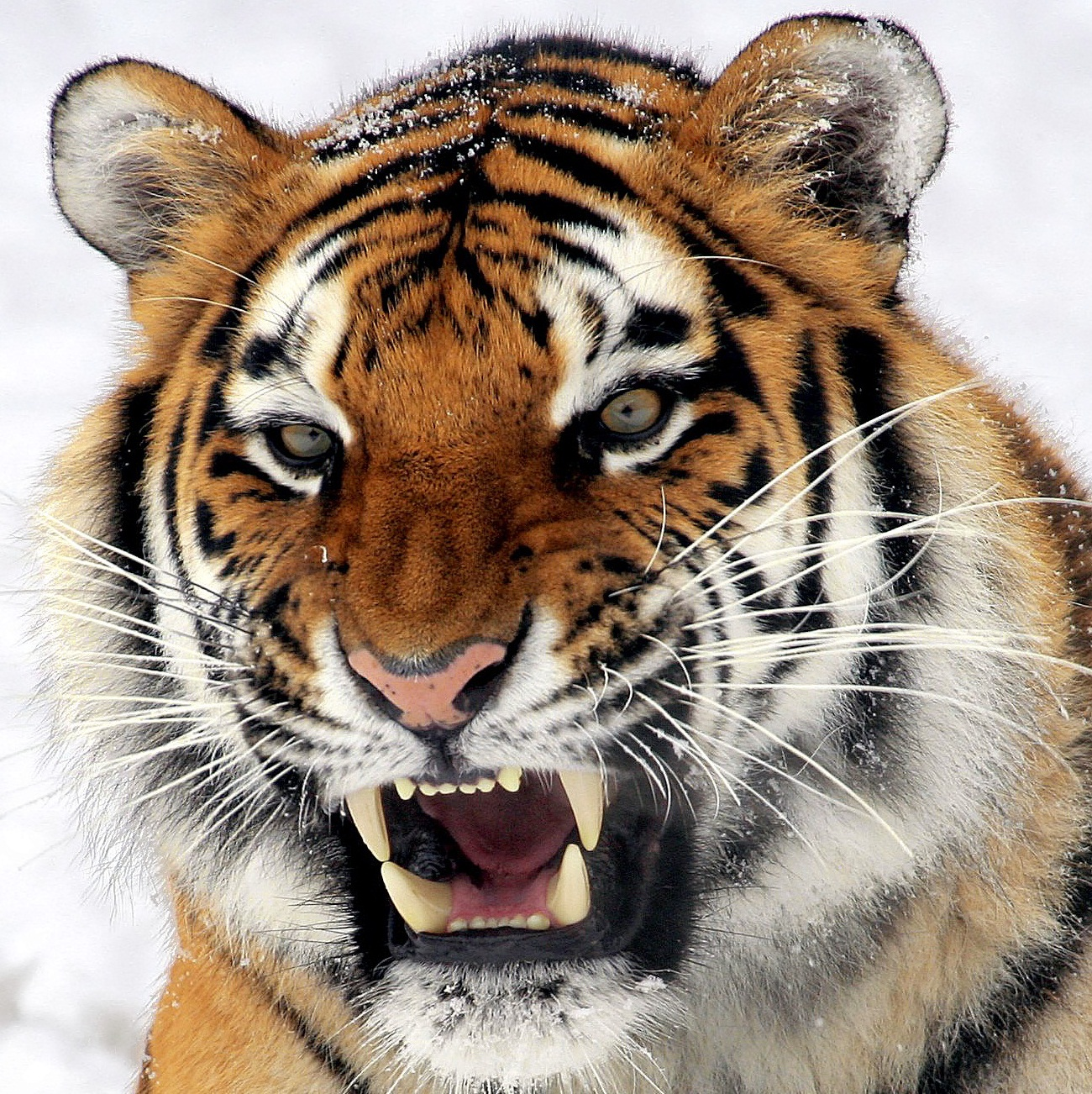
Many mammals, such as the tiger, bare their teeth as a sign of aggression—a form of aposematism.

Aggression is behavior aimed at opposing or attacking something or someone. Though often done with the intent to cause harm, some might channel it into creative and practical outlets. It may occur either reactively or without provocation. In humans, aggression can be caused by various triggers. For example, aggression may result from built-up frustration due to blocked goals or perceived disrespect. Human aggression can be classified into direct and indirect aggression; while the former is characterized by physical or verbal behavior intended to cause harm to someone, the latter is characterized by behavior intended to harm the social relations of an individual or group.

In definitions commonly used in the social sciences and behavioral sciences, aggression is an action or response by an individual that delivers something unpleasant to another person. Some definitions include that the individual must intend to harm another person.

In an interdisciplinary perspective, aggression is regarded as "an ensemble of mechanisms formed during the course of evolution in order to assert oneself, relatives, or friends against others, to gain or to defend resources (ultimate causes) by harmful damaging means. These mechanisms are often motivated by emotions such as fear, frustration, anger, stress, dominance or pleasure (proximate causes). Sometimes aggressive behavior serves as a stress relief or a subjective feeling of power." Predatory or defensive behavior between members of different species may not be considered aggression in the same sense.

Aggression can take a variety of forms, which may be expressed physically, or communicated verbally or non-verbally, including: anti-predator aggression, defensive aggression (fear-induced), predatory aggression, dominance aggression, inter-male aggression, resident-intruder aggression, maternal aggression, species-specific aggression, sex-related aggression, territorial aggression, isolation-induced aggression, irritable aggression, and brain-stimulation-induced aggression (hypothalamus). There are two subtypes of human aggression: (1) controlled-instrumental subtype (purposeful or goal-oriented); and (2) reactive-impulsive subtype (often elicits uncontrollable actions that are inappropriate or undesirable). Aggression differs from what is commonly called assertiveness, although the terms are often used interchangeably among laypeople (as in phrases such as "an aggressive salesperson").

== Overview ==
Dollard et al. (1939) proposed that aggression was due to frustration, which was described as an unpleasant emotion resulting from any interference with achieving a rewarding goal. Berkowitz extended this frustration–aggression hypothesis and proposed that it is not so much the frustration as the unpleasant emotion that evokes aggressive tendencies, and that all aversive events produce negative affect and thereby aggressive tendencies, as well as fear tendencies. Besides conditioned stimuli, Archer categorized aggression-evoking (as well as fear-evoking) stimuli into three groups; pain, novelty, and frustration, although he also described looming, which refers to an object rapidly moving towards the visual sensors of a subject, and can be categorized as "intensity."

Aggression can have adaptive benefits or negative effects. Aggressive behavior is an individual or collective social interaction that is a hostile behavior with the intention of inflicting damage or harm. Two broad categories of aggression are commonly distinguished. One includes affective (emotional) and hostile, reactive, or retaliatory aggression that is a response to provocation, and the other includes instrumental, goal-oriented or predatory, in which aggression is used as a means to achieve a goal. An example of hostile aggression would be a person who punches someone that insulted him or her. An instrumental form of aggression would be armed robbery. Research on violence from a range of disciplines lend some support to a distinction between affective and predatory aggression. However, some researchers question the usefulness of a hostile versus instrumental distinction in humans, despite its ubiquity in research, because most real-life cases involve mixed motives and interacting causes.

A number of classifications and dimensions of aggression have been suggested. These depend on such things as whether the aggression is verbal or physical; whether or not it involves relational aggression such as covert bullying and social manipulation; whether harm to others is intended or not; whether it is carried out actively or expressed passively; and whether the aggression is aimed directly or indirectly. Classification may also encompass aggression-related emotions (e.g., anger) and mental states (e.g., impulsivity, hostility). Aggression may occur in response to non-social as well as social factors, and can have a close relationship with stress coping style. Aggression may be displayed in order to intimidate.

The operative definition of aggression may be affected by moral or political views. Examples are the axiomatic moral view called the non-aggression principle and the political rules governing the behavior of one country toward another. Likewise in competitive sports, or in the workplace, some forms of aggression may be sanctioned and others not (see Workplace aggression). Aggressive behaviors are associated with adjustment problems and several psychopathological symptoms such as antisocial personality disorder, borderline personality disorder, and intermittent explosive disorder.

Biological approaches conceptualize aggression as an internal energy released by external stimuli, a product of evolution through natural selection, part of genetics, and a product of hormonal fluctuations. Psychological approaches conceptualize aggression as a destructive instinct, a response to frustration, an affect excited by a negative stimulus, a result of observed learning of society and diversified reinforcement, and a result of variables that affect personal and situational environments.

== Etymology ==
The term aggression comes from the Latin word aggressio, meaning attack. The Latin was itself a joining of ad- and gradi-, which meant "step at". The first known use dates back to 1611, in the sense of an unprovoked attack.

A psychological sense of "hostile or destructive behavior" dates back to a 1912 English translation of Sigmund Freud's writing. Alfred Adler theorized about an "aggressive drive" in 1908. Child raising experts began to refer to aggression, rather than anger, from the 1930s.

== Ethology ==
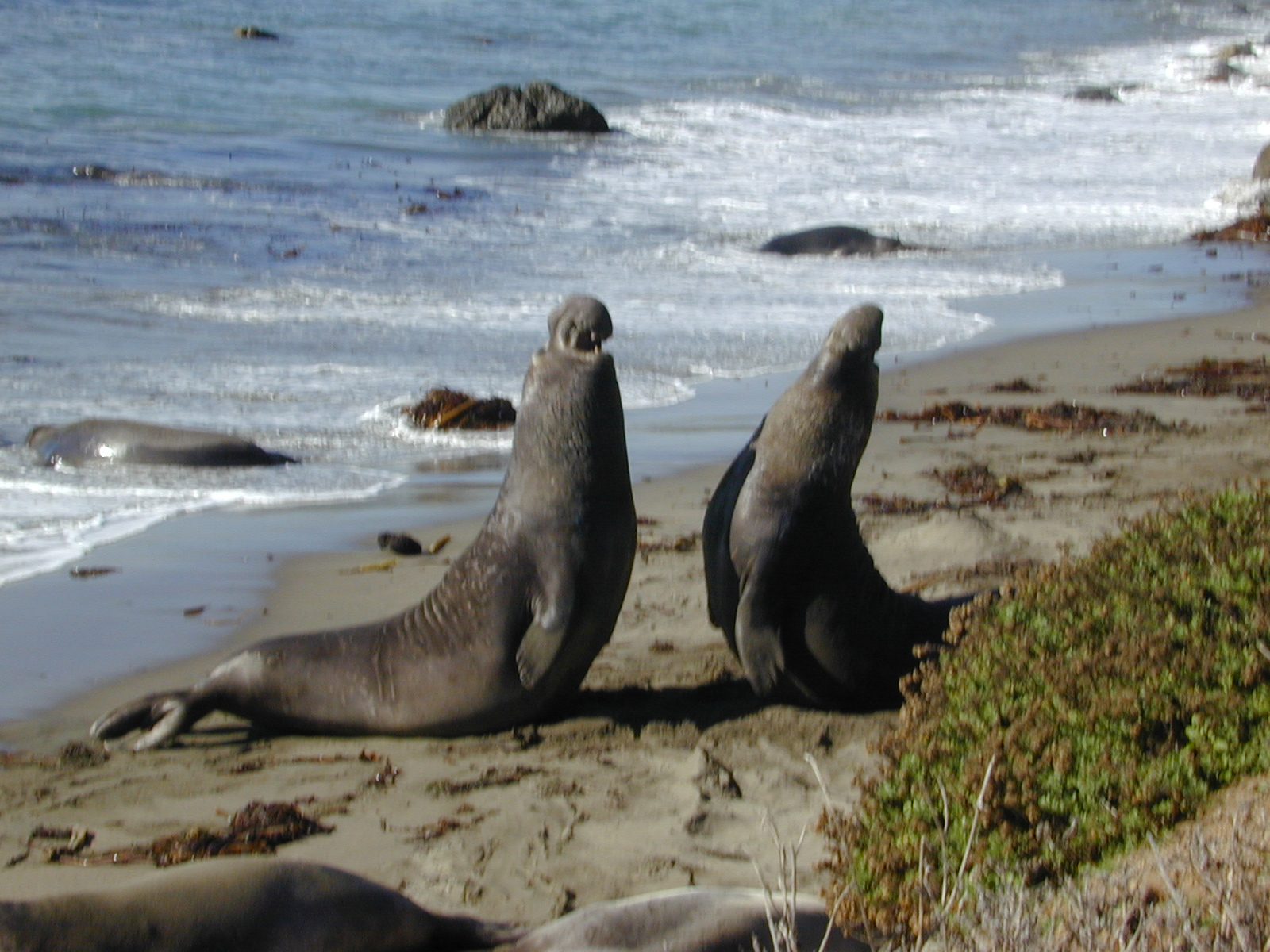
Male elephant seals fighting

Ethologists study aggression as it relates to the interaction and evolution of animals in natural settings. In such settings aggression can involve bodily contact such as biting, hitting or pushing, but most conflicts are settled by threat displays and intimidating thrusts that cause no physical harm. This form of aggression may include the display of body size, antlers, claws or teeth; stereotyped signals including facial expressions; vocalizations such as bird song; the release of chemicals; and changes in coloration. The term agonistic behavior is sometimes used to refer to these forms of behavior.

Most ethologists believe that aggression confers biological advantages. Aggression may help an animal secure territory, including resources such as food and water. Aggression between males often occurs to secure mating opportunities, and results in selection of the healthier/more vigorous animal. Aggression may also occur for self-protection or to protect offspring. Aggression between groups of animals may also confer advantage; for example, hostile behavior may force a population of animals into a new territory, where the need to adapt to a new environment may lead to an increase in genetic flexibility.

=== Between species and groups ===
The most apparent type of interspecific aggression is that observed in the interaction between a predator and its prey. However, according to many researchers, predation is not aggression. A cat does not hiss or arch its back when pursuing a rat, and the active areas in its hypothalamus resemble those that reflect hunger rather than those that reflect aggression. However, others refer to this behavior as predatory aggression, and point out cases that resemble hostile behavior, such as mouse-killing by rats. In aggressive mimicry a predator has the appearance of a harmless organism or object attractive to the prey; when the prey approaches, the predator attacks.

An animal defending against a predator may engage in either "fight or flight" or "tend and befriend" in response to predator attack or threat of attack, depending on its estimate of the predator's strength relative to its own. Alternative defenses include a range of antipredator adaptations, including alarm signals. An example of an alarm signal is Nerol, a chemical which is found in the mandibular glands of Trigona fulviventris individuals. Release of Nerol by T. fulviventris individuals in the nest has been shown to decrease the number of individuals leaving the nest by fifty percent, as well as increasing aggressive behaviors like biting. Alarm signals like nerol can also act as attraction signals; in T. fulviventris, individuals that have been captured by a predator may release nerol to attract nest mates, who will proceed to attack or bite the predator.

Aggression between groups is determined partly by willingness to fight, which depends on a number of factors including numerical advantage, distance from home territories, how often the groups encounter each other, competitive abilities, differences in body size, and whose territory is being invaded. Also, an individual is more likely to become aggressive if other aggressive group members are nearby. One particular phenomenon – the formation of coordinated coalitions that raid neighboring territories to kill conspecifics – has only been documented in two species in the animal kingdom: 'common' chimpanzees and humans.

=== Within a group ===
Aggression between conspecifics in a group typically involves access to resources and breeding opportunities. One of its most common functions is to establish a dominance hierarchy. This occurs in many species by aggressive encounters between contending males when they are first together in a common environment. Usually the more aggressive animals become the more dominant. In test situations, most of the conspecific aggression ceases about 24 hours after the group of animals is brought together. Aggression has been defined from this viewpoint as "behavior which is intended to increase the social dominance of the organism relative to the dominance position of other organisms". Losing confrontations may be called social defeat, and winning or losing is associated with a range of practical and psychological consequences.

Conflicts between animals occur in many contexts, such as between potential mating partners, between parents and offspring, between siblings and between competitors for resources. Group-living animals may dispute over the direction of travel or the allocation of time to joint activities. Various factors limit the escalation of aggression, including communicative displays, conventions, and routines. In addition, following aggressive incidents, various forms of conflict resolution have been observed in mammalian species, particularly in gregarious primates. These can mitigate or repair possible adverse consequences, especially for the recipient of aggression who may become vulnerable to attacks by other members of a group. Conciliatory acts vary by species and may involve specific gestures or simply more proximity and interaction between the individuals involved. However, conflicts over food are rarely followed by post conflict reunions, even though they are the most frequent type in foraging primates.

Other questions that have been considered in the study of primate aggression, including in humans, is how aggression affects the organization of a group, what costs are incurred by aggression, and why some primates avoid aggressive behavior. For example, bonobo chimpanzee groups are known for low levels of aggression within a partially matriarchal society. Captive animals including primates may show abnormal levels of social aggression and self-harm that are related to aspects of the physical or social environment; this depends on the species and individual factors such as gender, age and background (e.g., raised wild or captive).

=== Aggression, fear and curiosity ===
Within ethology, it has long been recognized that there is a relation between aggression, fear, and curiosity. A cognitive approach to this relationship puts aggression in the broader context of inconsistency reduction, and proposes that aggressive behavior is caused by an inconsistency between a desired, or expected, situation and the actually perceived situation (e.g., "frustration"), and functions to forcefully manipulate the perception into matching the expected situation. In this approach, when the inconsistency between perception and expectancy is small, learning as a result of curiosity reduces inconsistency by updating expectancy to match perception. If the inconsistency is larger, fear or aggressive behavior may be employed to alter the perception in order to make it match expectancy, depending on the size of the inconsistency as well as the specific context. Uninhibited fear results in fleeing, thereby removing the inconsistent stimulus from the perceptual field and resolving the inconsistency. In some cases, thwarted escape may trigger aggressive behavior in an attempt to remove the thwarting stimulus.

== Evolutionary explanations ==
Like many behaviors, aggression can be examined in terms of its ability to help an animal itself survive and reproduce, or alternatively to risk survival and reproduction. This cost–benefit analysis can be looked at in terms of evolution. However, there are profound differences in the extent of acceptance of a biological or evolutionary basis for human aggression.

=== Violence and conflict ===
Aggression can involve violence that may be adaptive under certain circumstances in terms of natural selection. This is most obviously the case in terms of attacking prey to obtain food, or in anti-predatory defense. It may also be the case in competition between members of the same species or subgroup, if the average reward (e.g., status, access to resources, protection of self or kin) outweighs average costs (e.g., injury, exclusion from the group, death). There are some hypotheses of specific adaptions for violence in humans under certain circumstances, including for homicide, but it is often unclear what behaviors may have been selected for and what may have been a byproduct, as in the case of collective violence.

Although aggressive encounters are ubiquitous in the animal kingdom, with often high stakes, most encounters that involve aggression may be resolved through posturing, or displaying and trial of strength. Game theory is used to understand how such behaviors might spread by natural selection within a population, and potentially become 'Evolutionary Stable Strategies'. An initial model of resolution of conflicts is the hawk-dove game. Others include the Sequential assessment model and the Energetic war of attrition. These try to understand not just one-off encounters but protracted stand-offs, and mainly differ in the criteria by which an individual decides to give up rather than risk loss and harm in physical conflict (such as through estimates of resource holding potential).

=== Gender ===
==== General ====
Gender plays an important role in human aggression. There are multiple theories that seek to explain findings that males and females of the same species can have differing aggressive behaviors. One review concluded that male aggression tended to produce pain or physical injury, whereas female aggression tended towards psychological or social harm.

In general, sexual dimorphism can be attributed to greater intraspecific competition in one sex, either between rivals for access to mates and/or to be chosen by mates. This may stem from the other gender being constrained by providing greater parental investment, in terms of factors such as gamete production, gestation, lactation, or upbringing of young. Although there is much variation in species, generally the more physically aggressive sex is the male, particularly in mammals. In species where parental care by both sexes is required, there tends to be less of a difference. When the female can leave the male to care for the offspring, then females may be the larger and more physically aggressive. Competitiveness despite parental investment has also been observed in some species. A related factor is the rate at which males and females are able to mate again after producing offspring, and the basic principles of sexual selection are also influenced by ecological factors affecting the ways or extent to which one sex can compete for the other. The role of such factors in human evolution is controversial.

The pattern of male and female aggression is argued to be consistent with evolved sexually selected behavioral differences, while alternative or complementary views emphasize conventional social roles stemming from physical evolved differences. Aggression in women may have evolved to be, on average, less physically dangerous and more covert or indirect. However, there are critiques of using animal behavior to explain human behavior, especially in the application of evolutionary explanations to contemporary human behavior, including differences between genders.

According to the 2015 International Encyclopedia of the Social & Behavioral Sciences, sex differences in aggression is one of the most robust and oldest findings in psychology. Past meta-analyses in the encyclopedia found males regardless of age engaged in more physical and verbal aggression while small effect for females engaging in more indirect aggression such as rumor spreading or gossiping. It also found males tend to engage in more unprovoked aggression at higher frequency than females. This analysis also conforms with the Oxford Handbook of Evolutionary Psychology which reviewed past analysis which found men to use more verbal and physical aggression with the difference being greater in the physical type.

There are more recent findings that show that differences in male and female aggression appear at about two years of age, though the differences in aggression are more consistent in middle-aged children and adolescence. Tremblay, Japel and Pérusse (1999) asserted that physically aggressive behaviors such as kicking, biting and hitting are age-typical expressions of innate and spontaneous reactions to biological drives such as anger, hunger, and affiliation. Girls' relational aggression, meaning non-physical or indirect, tends to increase after age two while physical aggression decreases. There was no significant difference in aggression between males and females before two years of age. A possible explanation for this could be that girls develop language skills more quickly than boys, and therefore have better ways of verbalizing their wants and needs. They are more likely to use communication when trying to retrieve a toy with the words "Ask nicely" or "Say please."

According to the journal of Aggressive Behaviour, an analysis across 9 countries found boys reported more in the use of physical aggression. At the same time no consistent sex differences emerged within relational aggression. It has been found that girls are more likely than boys to use reactive aggression and then retract, but boys are more likely to increase rather than to retract their aggression after their first reaction. Studies show girls' aggressive tactics included gossip, ostracism, breaking confidences, and criticism of a victim's clothing, appearance, or personality, whereas boys engage in aggression that involves a direct physical and/or verbal assault. This could be due to the fact that girls' frontal lobes develop earlier than boys, allowing them to self-restrain.

One factor that shows insignificant differences between male and female aggression is in sports. In sports, the rate of aggression in both contact and non-contact sports is relatively equal. Since the establishment of Title IX, female sports have increased in competitiveness and importance, which could contribute to the evening of aggression and the "need to win" attitude between both genders. Among sex differences found in adult sports were that females have a higher scale of indirect hostility while men have a higher scale of assault. Another difference found is that men have up to 20 times higher levels of testosterone than women.

==== In intimate relationships ====
Some studies suggest that romantic involvement in adolescence decreases aggression in males and females, but decreases at a higher rate in females. Females will seem more desirable to their mate if they fit in with society and females that are aggressive do not usually fit well in society. They can often be viewed as antisocial. Female aggression is not considered the norm in society and going against the norm can sometimes prevent one from getting a mate. However, studies have shown that an increasing number of women are getting arrested on domestic violence charges. In many states, women now account for a quarter to a third of all domestic violence arrests, up from less than 10 percent a decade ago.

The new statistics reflect a reality documented in research: women are perpetrators as well as victims of family violence. However, another equally possible explanation is a case of improved diagnostics: it has become more acceptable for men to report female domestic violence to the authorities while at the same time actual female domestic violence has not increased at all. This could be the case in a situation where men had become less ashamed of reporting female violence against them—such a situation could conceivably lead to an increasing number of women being arrested despite the actual number of violent women remaining the same.

In addition, males in competitive sports are often advised by their coaches not to be in intimate relationships based on the premise that they become more docile and less aggressive during an athletic event. The circumstances in which males and females experience aggression are also different. A study showed that social anxiety and stress were positively correlated with aggression in males, meaning that as stress and social anxiety increase, so does aggression. Furthermore, a male with higher social skills has a lower rate of aggressive behavior than a male with lower social skills. In females, higher rates of aggression were only correlated with higher rates of stress. Other than biological factors that contribute to aggression, there are physical factors as well.

==== Physiological factors ====
Regarding sexual dimorphism, humans fall into an intermediate group with moderate sex differences in body size but relatively large testes. This is a typical pattern of primates where several males and females live together in a group and the male faces an intermediate number of challenges from other males compared to exclusive polygyny and monogamy but frequent sperm competition.

Evolutionary psychology and sociobiology have also discussed and produced theories for some specific forms of male aggression such as sociobiological theories of rape and theories regarding the Cinderella effect.

== Physiology ==
=== Brain pathways ===
Many researchers focus on the brain to explain aggression. Numerous circuits within both neocortical and subcortical structures play a central role in controlling aggressive behavior, depending on the species, and the exact role of pathways may vary depending on the type of trigger or intention.

In mammals, the hypothalamus and periaqueductal gray of the midbrain are critical areas, as shown in studies on cats, rats, and monkeys. These brain areas control the expression of both behavioral and autonomic components of aggression in these species, including vocalization. Electrical stimulation of the hypothalamus causes aggressive behavior and the hypothalamus has receptors that help determine aggression levels based on their interactions with serotonin and vasopressin. In rodents, activation of estrogen receptor-expressing neurons in the ventrolateral portion of the ventromedial hypothalamus (VMHvl) was found to be sufficient to initiate aggression in both males and females. Midbrain areas involved in aggression have direct connections with both the brainstem nuclei controlling these functions, and with structures such as the amygdala and prefrontal cortex.

Stimulation of the amygdala results in augmented aggressive behavior in hamsters, while lesions of an evolutionarily homologous area in the lizard greatly reduce competitive drive and aggression (Bauman et al. 2006). In rhesus monkeys, neonatal lesions in the amygdala or hippocampus results in reduced expression of social dominance, related to the regulation of aggression and fear. Several experiments in attack-primed Syrian golden hamsters, for example, support the claim of circuitry within the amygdala being involved in control of aggression. The role of the amygdala is less clear in primates and appears to depend more on situational context, with lesions leading to increases in either social affiliatory or aggressive responses. Amygdalotomy, which involves removing or destroying parts of the amygdala, has been performed on people to reduce their violent behaviour.

The broad area of the cortex known as the prefrontal cortex (PFC) is crucial for self-control and inhibition of impulses, including inhibition of aggression and emotions. Reduced activity of the prefrontal cortex, in particular its medial and orbitofrontal portions, has been associated with violent/antisocial aggression. In addition, reduced response inhibition has been found in violent offenders, compared to non-violent offenders.

The role of the chemicals in the brain, particularly neurotransmitters, in aggression has also been examined. This varies depending on the pathway, the context and other factors such as gender. A deficit in serotonin has been theorized to have a primary role in causing impulsivity and aggression. At least one epigenetic study supports this supposition. Nevertheless, low levels of serotonin transmission may explain a vulnerability to impulsiveness, potential aggression, and may have an effect through interactions with other neurochemical systems. These include dopamine systems which are generally associated with attention and motivation toward rewards, and operate at various levels. Norepinephrine, also known as noradrenaline, may influence aggression responses both directly and indirectly through the hormonal system, the sympathetic nervous system or the central nervous system (including the brain). It appears to have different effects depending on the type of triggering stimulus, for example social isolation/rank versus shock/chemical agitation which appears not to have a linear relationship with aggression. Similarly, GABA, although associated with inhibitory functions at many CNS synapses, sometimes shows a positive correlation with aggression, including when potentiated by alcohol.

The hormonal neuropeptides vasopressin and oxytocin play a key role in complex social behaviours in many mammals such as regulating attachment, social recognition, and aggression. Vasopressin has been implicated in male-typical social behaviors which includes aggression. Oxytocin may have a particular role in regulating female bonds with offspring and mates, including the use of protective aggression. Initial studies in humans suggest some similar effects.

In human, aggressive behavior has been associated with abnormalities in three principal regulatory systems in the body serotonin systems, catecholamine systems, and the hypothalamic–pituitary–adrenal axis. Abnormalities in these systems also are known to be induced by stress, either severe, acute stress or chronic low-grade stress

=== Testosterone ===
Early androgenization has an organizational effect on the developing brains of both males and females, making more neural circuits that control sexual behavior as well as intermale and interfemale aggression become more sensitive to testosterone. There are noticeable sex differences in aggression. Testosterone is present to a lesser extent in females, who may be more sensitive to its effects. Animal studies have also indicated a link between incidents of aggression and the individual level of circulating testosterone. However, results in relation to primates, particularly humans, are less clear cut and are at best only suggestive of a positive association in some contexts.

In humans, there is a seasonal variation in aggression associated with changes in testosterone. For example, in some primate species, such as rhesus monkeys and baboons, females are more likely to engage in fights around the time of ovulation as well as right before menstruation. If the results were the same in humans as they are in rhesus monkeys and baboons, then the increase in aggressive behaviors during ovulation is explained by the decline in estrogen levels. This makes normal testosterone levels more effective. Castrated mice and rats exhibit lower levels of aggression. Males castrated as neonates exhibit low levels of aggression even when given testosterone throughout their development.

==== Challenge hypothesis ====
The challenge hypothesis outlines the dynamic relationship between plasma testosterone levels and aggression in mating contexts in many species. It proposes that testosterone is linked to aggression when it is beneficial for reproduction, such as in mate guarding and preventing the encroachment of intrasexual rivals. The challenge hypothesis predicts that seasonal patterns in testosterone levels in a species are a function of mating system (monogamy versus polygyny), paternal care, and male-male aggression in seasonal breeders.

This pattern between testosterone and aggression was first observed in seasonally breeding birds, such as the song sparrow, where testosterone levels rise modestly with the onset of the breeding season to support basic reproductive functions. The hypothesis has been subsequently expanded and modified to predict relationships between testosterone and aggression in other species. For example, chimpanzees, which are continuous breeders, show significantly raised testosterone levels and aggressive male-male interactions when receptive and fertile females are present. Currently, no research has specified a relationship between the modified challenge hypothesis and human behavior, or the human nature of concealed ovulation, although some suggest it may apply.

==== Effects on the nervous system ====
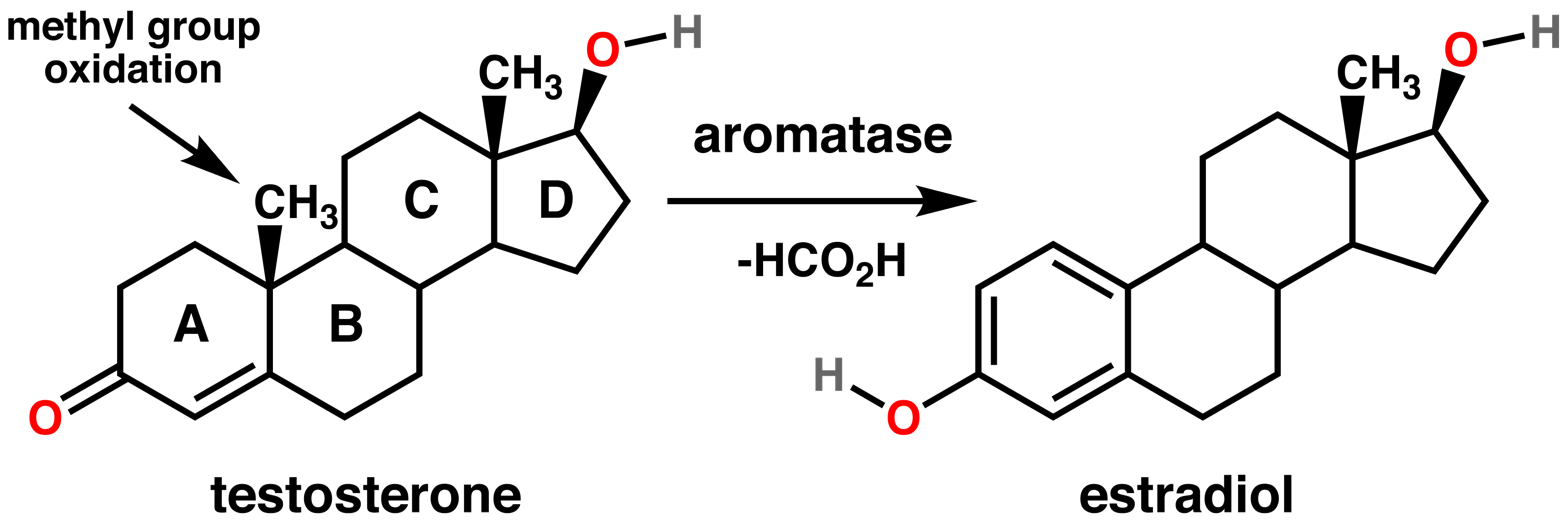
Testosterone to Estradiol conversion

Another line of research has focused on the proximate effects of circulating testosterone on the nervous system, as mediated by local metabolism within the brain. Testosterone can be metabolized to estradiol by the enzyme aromatase, or to dihydrotestosterone (DHT) by 5α-reductase.

Aromatase is highly expressed in regions involved in the regulation of aggressive behavior, such as the amygdala and hypothalamus. In studies using genetic knockout techniques in inbred mice, male mice that lacked a functional aromatase enzyme displayed a marked reduction in aggression. Long-term treatment with estradiol partially restored aggressive behavior, suggesting that the neural conversion of circulating testosterone to estradiol and its effect on estrogen receptors influences inter-male aggression. In addition, two different estrogen receptors, ERα and ERβ, have been identified as having the ability to exert different effects on aggression in mice. However, the effect of estradiol appears to vary depending on the strain of mouse, and in some strains it reduces aggression during long days (16 h of light), while during short days (8 h of light) estradiol rapidly increases aggression.

Another hypothesis is that testosterone influences brain areas that control behavioral reactions. Studies in animal models indicate that aggression is affected by several interconnected cortical and subcortical structures within the so-called social behavior network. A study involving lesions and electrical-chemical stimulation in rodents and cats revealed that such a neural network consists of the medial amygdala, medial hypothalamus and periaqueductal grey (PAG), and it positively modulates reactive aggression. Moreover, a study done in human subjects showed that prefrontal-amygdala connectivity is modulated by endogenous testosterone during social emotional behavior.

In human studies, testosterone-aggression research has also focused on the role of the orbitofrontal cortex (OFC). This brain area is strongly associated with impulse control and self-regulation systems that integrate emotion, motivation, and cognition to guide context-appropriate behavior. Patients with localized lesions to the OFC engage in heightened reactive aggression. Aggressive behavior may be regulated by testosterone via reduced medial OFC engagement following social provocation. When measuring participants' salivary testosterone, higher levels can predict subsequent aggressive behavioral reactions to unfairness faced during a task. Moreover, brain scanning with fMRI shows reduced activity in the medial OFC during such reactions. Such findings may suggest that a specific brain region, the OFC, is a key factor in understanding reactive aggression.

==== General associations with behavior ====
Scientists have for a long time been interested in the relationship between testosterone and aggressive behavior. In most species, males are more aggressive than females. Castration of males usually has a pacifying effect on aggressive behavior in males. In humans, males engage in crime and especially violent crime more than females. The involvement in crime usually rises in the early teens to mid teens which happen at the same time as testosterone levels rise. Research on the relationship between testosterone and aggression is difficult since the only reliable measurement of brain testosterone is by a lumbar puncture which is not done for research purposes. Studies therefore have often instead used more unreliable measurements from blood or saliva.

The Handbook of Crime Correlates, a review of crime studies, states most studies support a link between adult criminality and testosterone although the relationship is modest if examined separately for each sex. However, nearly all studies of juvenile delinquency and testosterone are not significant. Most studies have also found testosterone to be associated with behaviors or personality traits linked with criminality such as antisocial behavior and alcoholism. Many studies have also been done on the relationship between more general aggressive behavior/feelings and testosterone. About half the studies have found a relationship and about half no relationship.

Studies of testosterone levels in male athletes before and after a competition revealed that testosterone levels rise shortly before their matches, as if in anticipation of the competition, and are dependent on the outcome of the event: testosterone levels of winners are high relative to those of losers. No specific response of testosterone levels to competition was observed in female athletes, although a mood difference was noted. In addition, some experiments have failed to find a relationship between testosterone levels and aggression in humans.

The possible correlation between testosterone and aggression could explain the "roid rage" that can result from anabolic steroid use, although an effect of abnormally high levels of steroids does not prove an effect at physiological levels.

=== Dehydroepiandrosterone ===
Dehydroepiandrosterone (DHEA) is the most abundant circulating androgen hormone and can be rapidly metabolized within target tissues into potent androgens and estrogens. Gonadal steroids generally regulate aggression during the breeding season, but non-gonadal steroids may regulate aggression during the non-breeding season. Castration of various species in the non-breeding season has no effect on territorial aggression. In several avian studies, circulating DHEA has been found to be elevated in birds during the non-breeding season. These data support the idea that non-breeding birds combine adrenal and/or gonadal DHEA synthesis with neural DHEA metabolism to maintain territorial behavior when gonadal testosterone secretion is low. Similar results have been found in studies involving different strains of rats, mice, and hamsters. DHEA levels also have been studied in humans and may play a role in human aggression. Circulating DHEAS (its sulfated ester) levels rise during adrenarche (≈7 years of age) while plasma testosterone levels are relatively low. This implies that aggression in pre-pubertal children with aggressive conduct disorder might be correlated with plasma DHEAS rather than plasma testosterone, suggesting an important link between DHEAS and human aggressive behavior.

=== Glucocorticoids ===
Glucocorticoid hormones have an important role in regulating aggressive behavior. In adult rats, acute injections of corticosterone promote aggressive behavior, and acute reduction of corticosterone decreases aggression; however, chronic reduction of corticosterone levels can produce abnormally aggressive behavior. In addition, glucocorticoids affect the development of aggression and the establishment of social hierarchies. Adult mice with low baseline levels of corticosterone are more likely to become dominant than mice with high baseline corticosterone levels.

Glucocorticoids are released by the hypothalamic pituitary adrenal (HPA) axis in response to stress, of which cortisol is the most prominent in humans. Results in adults suggest that reduced levels of cortisol, linked to lower fear or a reduced stress response, can be associated with more aggression. However, it may be that proactive aggression is associated with low cortisol levels while reactive aggression may be accompanied by elevated levels. Differences in assessments of cortisol may also explain a diversity of results, particularly in children.

The HPA axis is related to the general fight-or-flight response or acute stress reaction, and the role of catecholamines such as epinephrine, popularly known as adrenaline.

=== Pheromones ===
In many animals, aggression can be linked to pheromones released between conspecifics. In mice, major urinary proteins (Mups) have been demonstrated to promote innate aggressive behavior in males, and can be mediated by neuromodulatory systems. Mups activate olfactory sensory neurons in the vomeronasal organ (VNO), a subsystem of the nose known to detect pheromones via specific sensory receptors, of mice and rats. Pheromones have also been identified in fruit flies, detected by neurons in the antenna, that send a message to the brain eliciting aggression; it has been noted that aggression pheremones have not been identified in humans.

== Genetics ==
In general, differences in a continuous phenotype such as aggression are likely to result from the action of a large number of genes, each of small effect, which interact with each other and the environment through development and life.

In a non-mammalian example of genes related to aggression, the fruitless gene in fruit flies is a critical determinant of certain sexually dimorphic behaviors, and its artificial alteration can result in a reversal of stereotypically male and female patterns of aggression in fighting. However, in what was thought to be a relatively clear case, inherent complexities have been reported in deciphering the connections between interacting genes in an environmental context and a social phenotype involving multiple behavioral and sensory interactions with another organism.

In mice, candidate genes for differentiating aggression between the sexes are the Sry (sex determining region Y) gene, located on the Y chromosome and the Sts (steroid sulfatase) gene. The Sts gene encodes the steroid sulfatase enzyme, which is pivotal in the regulation of neurosteroid biosynthesis. It is expressed in both sexes, is correlated with levels of aggression among male mice, and increases dramatically in females after parturition and during lactation, corresponding to the onset of maternal aggression. At least one study has found a possible epigenetic signature (i.e., decreased methylation at a specific CpG site on the promoter region) of the serotonin receptor 5-HT3a that is associated with maternal aggression among human subjects.

Mice with experimentally elevated sensitivity to oxidative stress (through inhibition of copper-zinc superoxide dismutase, SOD1 activity) were tested for aggressive behavior. Males completely deficient in SOD1 were found to be more aggressive than both wild-type males and males that express 50% of this antioxidant enzyme. They were also faster to attack another male. The causal connection between SOD1 deficiency and increased aggression is not yet understood.

In humans, there is good evidence that the basic human neural architecture underpinning the potential for flexible aggressive responses is influenced by genes as well as environment. In terms of variation between individual people, more than 100 twin and adoption studies have been conducted in recent decades examining the genetic basis of aggressive behavior and related constructs such as conduct disorders. According to a meta-analysis published in 2002, approximately 40% of variation between individuals is explained by differences in genes, and 60% by differences in environment (mainly non-shared environmental influences rather than those that would be shared by being raised together). However, such studies have depended on self-report or observation by others including parents, which complicates interpretation of the results.

The few laboratory-based analyses have not found significant amounts of individual variation in aggression explicable by genetic variation in the human population. Furthermore, linkage and association studies that seek to identify specific genes, for example that influence neurotransmitter or hormone levels, have generally resulted in contradictory findings characterized by failed attempts at replication. One possible factor is an allele (variant) of the MAO-A gene which, in interaction with certain life events such as childhood maltreatment (which may show a main effect on its own), can influence development of brain regions such as the amygdala and as a result some types of behavioral response may be more likely. The generally unclear picture has been compared to equally difficult findings obtained in regard to other complex behavioral phenotypes. For example, both 7R and 5R, ADHD-linked VNTR alleles of dopamine receptor D4 gene are directly associated with the incidence of proactive aggression in the men with no history of ADHD.

== Society and culture ==
Humans share aspects of aggression with non-human animals, and have specific aspects and complexity related to factors such as genetics, early development, social learning and flexibility, culture and morals. Konrad Lorenz stated in his 1963 classic, On Aggression, that human behavior is shaped by four main, survival-seeking animal drives. Taken together, these drives—hunger, fear, reproduction, and aggression—achieve natural selection. E. O. Wilson elaborated in On Human Nature that aggression is, typically, a means of gaining control over resources. Aggression is, thus, aggravated during times when high population densities generate resource shortages. According to Richard Leakey and his colleagues, aggression in humans has also increased by becoming more interested in ownership and by defending his or her property. However, UNESCO adopted the Seville Statement of Violence in 1989 that refuted claims, by evolutionary scientists, that genetics by itself was the sole cause of aggression.

Social and cultural aspects may significantly interfere with the distinct expression of aggressiveness. For example, a high population density, when associated with a decrease of available resources, might be a significant intervening variable for the occurrence of violent acts.

=== Culture ===
Culture is one of the factors that influence aggression. Tribal or band societies existing before or outside of modern states have sometimes been depicted as peaceful "noble savages". The ǃKung people, for instance, were described as "The Harmless People" in a popular work by Elizabeth Marshall Thomas in 1958. However, Lawrence Keeley's 1996 War Before Civilization suggested that regular warfare without modern technology was conducted by most groups throughout human history, including most Native American tribes.

Research on hunter-gatherers has revealed a range of behavioral patterns. While aggression, conflict and violence can occur, direct confrontation is generally avoided, and disputes are often managed through various verbal and non-verbal social mechanisms. Different rates of aggression or violence—whether contemporary or historical—have been associated with social structures and environmental factors such as resource distribution or property acquisition, land use, subsistence strategies, and population dynamics.

American psychologist Peter Gray hypothesizes that band hunter-gatherer societies are able maintain relatively egalitarian and peaceful relationships through mechanisms such as fostering a pervasive playful spirit, the use of humor to deter dominance, and non-coercive, indulgent child-rearing practices. Gray likens hunter-gatherer bands to social play groups, while stressing that such play is not frivolous or even easy at all times. According to Gray, "Social play—that is, play involving more than one player—is necessarily egalitarian. It always requires a suspension of aggression and dominance along with a heightened sensitivity to the needs and desires of the other players".

Joan Durrant of the University of Manitoba reports that multiple studies have found an association between physical punishment and higher levels of aggression directed toward parents, siblings, peers, and spouses, even when controlling for other influencing factors.

Similarly, Elizabeth Gershoff of the University of Texas at Austin has found that the more frequently children experience physical punishment, the more likely they are, as adults, to engage in violent behavior toward family members, including intimate partners.

In countries where the physical punishment of children is more culturally accepted, its association with increased aggression tends to be weaker. However, research indicates that physical punishment predicts some increase in child aggression regardless of cultural context.

Although these associations do not establish causality, a number of longitudinal studies suggest that experiencing physical punishment can have a direct causal impact on later aggressive behavior. In a review of several such studies examining the relationship between disciplinary spanking and aggression in children from preschool through adolescence, Elizabeth Gershoff concluded: "Spanking consistently predicted increases in children's aggression over time, regardless of how aggressive children were when the spanking occurred".

Similar findings were reported in a 2010 study led by Catherine Taylor at Tulane University, which identified a link between maternal spanking of three-year-old children and an increased risk of later aggressive behavior.

Family violence researcher Murray A. Straus contends that such evidence has often been overlooked, largely due to a prevailing belief that spanking is more effective than nonviolent forms of discipline. He warns, however, that this belief persists despite evidence of harmful side effects.

Cultural and political interpretations of aggression are further complicated by the subjective use of the term "aggressive", which may reflect value judgments depending on the observer's cultural or ideological standpoint. Whether a coercive or violent act is viewed as aggression—or as legitimate or illegitimate aggression—often depends on the social positions of those involved relative to their culture's structure. Relevant factors may include: norms governing coordination and resource distribution; definitions of self-defense and provocation; attitudes toward outsiders and marginalized groups such as women, disabled individuals, or people of lower status; the presence of alternative conflict resolution mechanisms; levels of trade interdependence and participation in collective security pacts; and broader material or social objectives.

Cross-cultural research has found differences in attitudes towards aggression in different cultures. In one questionnaire study of university students, in addition to men overall justifying some types of aggression more than women, United States respondents justified defensive physical aggression more readily than Japanese or Spanish respondents, whereas Japanese students preferred direct verbal aggression (but not indirect) more than their American and Spanish counterparts.

Within American culture, men from the southern United States were found in a study of university students to react more strongly and respond more aggressively than their northern counterparts when randomly insulted after being bumped into. This behavior was theorized to reflect a traditional culture of honor prevalent in the Southern United States, associated with concepts such as "saving face."

Other cultural frameworks frequently considered in aggression research include contrasts between individualistic and collectivist orientations. These may influence how individuals respond to disputes—for example, through open competition or by accommodating others and avoiding conflict.

In a study including 62 countries, school principals reported higher levels of aggressive student behavior in cultures characterized as more individualistic and, correspondingly, less collectivist.

Other cross-cultural comparisons related to aggression and conflict have examined differences between democratic and authoritarian political systems, as well as between egalitarian and stratified societies.

The economic system known as capitalism has been interpreted by some scholars as relying on human competitiveness and aggression to drive the pursuit of resources and trade. This perspective has been viewed both positively, as a motivator for innovation and efficiency, and negatively, as a source of inequality and conflict.

Finally, the perceived legitimacy of aggressive acts are influenced by cultural and political attitudes regarding the social acceptability of certain actions or targets. These perceptions are often contested, particularly in cases involving religion or international disputes. One prominent example is the Arab–Israeli conflict, where acts labeled as aggression by one group may be framed as defense or resistance by another.

==== Media ====
Some researchers argue that behaviors such as aggression may be partially learned through observation and imitation of others, a concept rooted in social learning theory. This perspective includes the view that exposure to media violence may exert small effects on aggressive behavior. However, this remains a subject of ongoing debate, and other scholars have challenged the strength or consistency of such effects.

For example, a prospective study of adolescents found no long-term relationship between violent video game use and subsequent youth violence or bullying. A meta-analysis concluded that the effect of violent video games on aggression is generally smaller than that found in studies on television violence. The magnitude of this effect was positively associated with the intensity of violent content and negatively associated with the amount of time spent playing. The study concluded that the available evidence was insufficient to establish a causal relationship between violent video games and increased aggression.

Conversely, other research has reported associations between violent video game exposure and heightened aggressive thoughts, feelings, and behaviors both in laboratory settings and real-life contexts.

=== Children ===
The frequency of physical aggression in humans peaks at around 2–3 years of age. It then declines gradually on average. These observations suggest that physical aggression is not only a learned behavior but that development provides opportunities for the learning and biological development of self-regulation. However, a small subset of children fail to acquire all the necessary self-regulatory abilities and tend to show atypical levels of physical aggression across development. They may be at risk for later violent behavior or, conversely, a lack of aggression that may be considered necessary within society.

However, some findings suggest that early aggression does not necessarily lead to aggression later on, although the course through early childhood is an important predictor of outcomes in middle childhood. In addition, physical aggression that continues is likely occurring in the context of family adversity, including socioeconomic factors. Moreover, 'opposition' and 'status violations' in childhood appear to be more strongly linked to social problems in adulthood than simply aggressive antisocial behavior. Social learning through interactions in early childhood has been seen as a building block for levels of aggression which play a crucial role in the development of peer relationships in middle childhood. Overall, an interplay of biological, social and environmental factors can be considered. Some research indicates that changes in the weather can increase the likelihood of children exhibiting deviant behavior.

==== Typical expectations ====
- Young children preparing to enter kindergarten need to develop the socially important skill of being assertive. Examples of assertiveness include asking others for information, initiating conversation, or being able to respond to peer pressure.
- In contrast, some young children use aggressive behavior, such as hitting or biting, as a form of communication.
- Aggressive behavior can impede learning as a skill deficit, while assertive behavior can facilitate learning. However, with young children, aggressive behavior is developmentally appropriate and can lead to opportunities of building conflict resolution and communication skills.
- By school age, children should learn more socially appropriate forms of communicating such as expressing themselves through verbal or written language; if they have not, this behavior may signify a disability or developmental delay.

==== Aggression triggers ====
- Physical fear of others
- Family difficulties
- Learning, neurological, or conduct/behavior disorders
- Psychological trauma

The Bobo doll experiment was conducted by Albert Bandura in 1961. In this work, Bandura found that children exposed to an aggressive adult model acted more aggressively than those who were exposed to a nonaggressive adult model. This experiment suggests that anyone who comes in contact with and interacts with children can affect the way they react and handle situations.

Summary points from recommendations by national associations

- American Academy of Pediatrics (2011): "The best way to prevent aggressive behavior is to give your child a stable, secure home life with firm, loving discipline and full-time supervision during the toddler and preschool years. Everyone who cares for your child should be a good role model and agree on the rules he's expected to observe as well as the response to use if he disobeys."
- National Association of School Psychologists (2008): "Proactive aggression is typically reasoned, unemotional, and focused on acquiring some goal. For example, a bully wants peer approval and victim submission, and gang members want status and control. In contrast, reactive aggression is frequently highly emotional and is often the result of biased or deficient cognitive processing on the part of the student."

=== Gender ===
Gender is a factor that plays a role in both human and animal aggression. Males are historically believed to be generally more physically aggressive than females from an early age, and men commit the vast majority of murders (Buss 2005). This is one of the most robust and reliable behavioral sex differences, and it has been found across many different age groups and cultures. However, some empirical studies have found the discrepancy in male and female aggression to be more pronounced in childhood and the gender difference in adults to be modest when studied in an experimental context. Still, there is evidence that males are quicker to aggression (Frey et al. 2003) and more likely than females to express their aggression physically. When considering indirect forms of non-violent aggression, such as relational aggression and social rejection, some scientists argue that females can be quite aggressive, although female aggression is rarely expressed physically. An exception is intimate partner violence that occurs among couples who are engaged, married, or in some other form of intimate relationship.

Although females are less likely than males to initiate physical violence, they can express aggression by using a variety of non-physical means. Exactly which method women use to express aggression is something that varies from culture to culture. On Bellona Island, a culture based on male dominance and physical violence, women tend to get into conflicts with other women more frequently than with men. When in conflict with males, instead of using physical means, they make up songs mocking the man, which spread across the island and humiliate him. If a woman wanted to kill a man, she would either convince her male relatives to kill him or hire an assassin. Although these two methods involve physical violence, both are forms of indirect aggression, since the aggressor herself avoids getting directly involved or putting herself in immediate physical danger.

See also the sections on testosterone and evolutionary explanations for gender differences above.

=== Situational factors ===
There has been some links between those prone to violence and their alcohol use. Those who are prone to violence and use alcohol are more likely to carry out violent acts. Alcohol impairs judgment, making people much less cautious than they usually are (MacDonald et al. 1996). It also disrupts the way information is processed (Bushman 1993, 1997; Bushman & Cooper 1990).

Recent research further demonstrates that in everyday situations, violations of social norms can be perceived as provocations that trigger aggression, which can have negative consequences for individuals and social coexistence. Based on the General Aggression Model (GAM), experimental evidence shows that physical provocation affects the internal state (cognition, arousal, and affect) of the provoked person and shapes their responses. The social status of the provocateur can play a moderating role in this process: a higher-status provocateur induces a more aggression-prone internal state, but the likelihood of verbal retaliation is less affected by internal state when provocation comes from high status. These dynamics, illustrate how intentional provocation reduces the probability of ignoring the incident and increases the likelihood of verbal or physical aggression, mediated by changes in the internal state. Overall, this mechanism highlights the importance of situational and social factors—such as status—in everyday aggression and its regulation. This also adds to the currently inconclusive evidence about the role of the social status on aggression and highlights to importance of further inquiry.

Pain and discomfort also increase aggression. Even the simple act of placing one's hands in hot water can cause an aggressive response. Hot temperatures have been implicated as a factor in a number of studies. One study completed in the midst of the civil rights movement found that riots were more likely on hotter days than cooler ones (Carlsmith & Anderson 1979). Students were found to be more aggressive and irritable after taking a test in a hot classroom (Anderson et al. 1996, Rule, et al. 1987). Drivers in cars without air conditioning were also found to be more likely to honk their horns (Kenrick & MacFarlane 1986), which is used as a measure of aggression and has shown links to other factors such as generic symbols of aggression or the visibility of other drivers.

Frustration is another major cause of aggression. The Frustration aggression theory states that aggression increases if a person feels that he or she is being blocked from achieving a goal (Aronson et al. 2005). One study found that the closeness to the goal makes a difference. The study examined people waiting in line and concluded that the 2nd person was more aggressive than the 12th one when someone cut in line (Harris 1974). Unexpected frustration may be another factor. In a separate study to demonstrate how unexpected frustration leads to increased aggression, Kulik & Brown (1979) selected a group of students as volunteers to make calls for charity donations. One group was told that the people they would call would be generous and the collection would be very successful. The other group was given no expectations. The group that expected success was more upset when no one was pledging than the group who did not expect success (everyone actually had horrible success). This research suggests that when an expectation does not materialize (successful collections), unexpected frustration arises which increases aggression.

There is some evidence to suggest that the presence of violent objects such as a gun can trigger aggression. In a study done by Leonard Berkowitz and Anthony Le Page (1967), college students were made angry and then left in the presence of a gun or badminton racket. They were then led to believe they were delivering electric shocks to another student, as in the Milgram experiment. Those who had been in the presence of the gun administered more shocks. It is possible that a violence-related stimulus increases the likelihood of aggressive cognitions by activating the semantic network.

A new proposal links military experience to anger and aggression, developing aggressive reactions and investigating these effects on those possessing the traits of a serial killer. Castle and Hensley state, "The military provides the social context where servicemen learn aggression, violence, and murder." Post-traumatic stress disorder (PTSD) is also a serious issue in the military, also believed to sometimes lead to aggression in soldiers who are suffering from what they witnessed in battle. They come back to the civilian world and may still be haunted by flashbacks and nightmares, causing severe stress. In addition, it has been claimed that in the rare minority who are claimed to be inclined toward serial killing, violent impulses may be reinforced and refined in war, possibly creating more effective murderers.

=== As a positive adaptation theory ===
Some recent scholarship has questioned traditional psychological conceptualizations of aggression as universally negative. Most traditional psychological definitions of aggression focus on the harm to the recipient of the aggression, implying this is the intent of the aggressor; however this may not always be the case. From this alternate view, although the recipient may or may not be harmed, the perceived intent is to increase the status of the aggressor, not necessarily to harm the recipient. Such scholars contend that traditional definitions of aggression have no validity because of how challenging it is to study directly.

From this view, rather than concepts such as assertiveness, aggression, violence and criminal violence existing as distinct constructs, they exist instead along a continuum with moderate levels of aggression being most adaptive. Such scholars do not consider this a trivial difference, noting that many traditional researchers' aggression measurements may measure outcomes lower down in the continuum, at levels which are adaptive, yet they generalize their findings to non-adaptive levels of aggression, thus losing precision.

== See also ==
- Aggressionism
- Aggressive narcissism
- Bullying
- Child abuse
- Conflict (disambiguation)
- Cute aggression
- Displaced aggression
- Duelling
- Frustration-Aggression Hypothesis
- Hero syndrome
- Homo homini lupus
- List of investigational aggression drugs
- Microaggression
- Non-aggression pact
- Non-aggression principle
- Parental abuse by children
- Passive aggressive behavior
- Rage (emotion)
- Relational aggression
- Resource holding potential
- Revenge
- School bullying
- School violence
- Social defeat
- Violence
