= Culture of honor (Southern United States) =

Cultural attribute of the southern United States

The traditional culture of the Southern United States has been called a "culture of honor", that is, a culture where people avoid intentionally offending others, and maintain a reputation for not accepting improper conduct by others. A theory as to why the American South had or may have had this culture is an assumed regional belief in retributive justice to enforce one's rights and deter predation against one's family, home, and possessions.

== Background ==
The culture of honor in the Southern United States may have its roots in the livelihoods of the settlers who first inhabited the region. Unlike those from the densely populated South East England and East Anglia, who settled in New England, the Southern United States was settled by herders from Scotland, Northern Ireland, Northern England, and the West Country. Herds, unlike crops, are vulnerable to theft because they are mobile and there is little government ability to deter such theft. The theory holds that developing a reputation for violent retribution against those who stole herd animals was one way to discourage theft of livestock.

This thesis is contested by evidence that a culture of honor in the American South is strongest not in the hill country, where this thesis suggests it has its cultural origins, but in the Southern lowlands. Critics argue that poverty or religion, which has been distinctive in the American South since the Second Great Awakening in the 19th century, might be the more relevant historical key drivers of this cultural phenomenon.

Other theories point out that the culture of honor may have its roots in the settlement of the region by members of British aristocratic families.

== History ==
During the 19th Century the slaveowning planter class of the South would codify their concepts of honor and gallantry under the code of Southern chivalry, depicting the rich and sophisticated Southern gentleman as a knightly Cavalier with a paternal responsibility towards those subservient to him.

== Gender roles ==
The Southern culture of honor includes a notion that ladies should not be insulted by gentlemen. Southern gentlemen are also expected to be chivalrous toward women, in words and deeds.

Although "culture of honor" qualities have generally been associated with men in the southern United States, women in the region have also been involved, and even exhibited some of the same qualities. In Culture of Honor, it is stated that women play a part in the culture, both "through their role in the socialization process, as well as active participation". By passing these ideas along to their children, they are taking part in social conditioning.

== Psychology ==
Laboratory research has demonstrated that men in honor cultures perceive interpersonal threats more readily than do men in other cultures, including increases in cortisol and testosterone levels following insults. In culture-of-honor states, high school students were found to be more likely to bring a weapon to school in the past month and over a 20-year period, there were more than twice as many school shootings per capita. According to Lindsey Osterman and Ryan Brown in Culture of Honor and Violence Against the Self, "[i]ndividuals (particularly Whites) living in honor states are at an especially high risk for committing suicide." This claim is reflected more broadly in statistics of suicide mortality rate by state, as states in the Western United States have similarly high rates of suicide.

== Sociology ==
The historian David Hackett Fischer, a professor of history at Brandeis University, makes a case for an enduring genetic basis for a "willingness to resort to violence" (citing especially the finding of high blood levels of testosterone as discussed above) in the four main chapters of his book Albion's Seed. He proposes that a Southern propensity for violence is inheritable by genetic changes wrought over generations living in traditional herding societies in Northern England, the Scottish Borders, and Irish Border Region. He proposes that this propensity has been transferred to other ethnic groups by shared culture, whence it can be traced to different urban populations of the United States. However, honor cultures were and are widely prevalent in Africa and many other places.

Randolph Roth, in his American Homicide (2009), states that the idea of a culture of honor is oversimplified. He argues that the violence often committed by Southerners resulted from social tensions. He hypothesizes that when people feel that they are denied social success or the means to attain it, they will be more prone to commit violent acts. His argument is that Southerners were in tension, possibly due to poor Whites being marginalized by rich Whites, free and enslaved Blacks being denied basic rights, and rich and politically empowered Whites having their power threatened by Northern politicians pushing for more federal control of the South, especially over abolition. He argues that issues over honor just triggered the already present hostility, and that people took their frustration out through violent acts often on the surface over issues of honor. He draws historical records of violence across the U.S. and Europe to show that violence largely accompanies perceptions of political weakness and the inability to advance oneself in society. Roth also shows that although the South was "obsessed with honor" in the mid-18th century, there was relatively little homicide. Barring under-reported crime against some groups, low homicide may simply have been gentlemanly self-restraint at a time when social order was stable, a trend that reverses in the 19th century and later. (Note: In American Homicide, Randolph Roth charts changes in the character and incidence of homicide in the U.S. from colonial times to the present. Roth argues that the United States is distinctive in its level of violence among unrelated adults—friends, acquaintances, and strangers. America was extraordinarily homicidal in the mid-seventeenth century, but it became relatively non-homicidal by the mid-eighteenth century, even in the slave South; and by the early nineteenth century, rates in the North and the mountain South were extremely low. But the homicide rate rose substantially among unrelated adults in the slave South after the American Revolution; and it skyrocketed across the United States from the late 1840s through the mid-1870s, while rates in most other Western nations held steady or fell. That surge—and all subsequent increases in the homicide rate—correlated closely with four distinct phenomena: political instability; a loss of government legitimacy; a loss of fellow-feeling among members of society caused by racial, religious, or political antagonism; and a loss of faith in the social hierarchy. Those four factors, Roth argues, best explain why homicide rates have gone up and down in the United States and in other Western nations over the past four centuries, and why the United States is today the most homicidal affluent nation.)

== See also ==
- Guilt–shame–fear spectrum of cultures
- Southern hospitality
- Culture of honor (Middle East)
