= Fruitless (gene) =

Fruit fly gene

fruitless

Identifiers
- Organism: Drosophila melanogaster
- Symbol: fru
- Entrez: 42226
- Orthologs: NCBI: entry; OMA: entry
- RefSeq (mRNA): NM_169821.1
- RefSeq (Prot): NP_732349.1
- UniProt: Q8IN81

Other data
- Chromosome: 3R: 14.22 - 14.39 Mb
Search for
- Structures: Swiss-model
- Domains: InterPro

The fruitless gene (fru) is a Drosophila melanogaster gene that encodes several variants of a putative transcription factor protein. Normal fruitless function is required for proper development of several anatomical structures necessary for courtship, including motor neurons which innervate muscles needed for fly sexual behaviors. The gene does not have an obvious mammalian homolog, but appears to function in sex determination in species as distant as the mosquito Anopheles gambiae.

fruitless serves as an example of how a gene or a group of genes may regulate the development and/or function of neurons involved in innate behavior. Research on fruitless has received attention in the popular press, since it provokes discussion on genetics of human sexual orientation, and behaviors such as gender-specific aggression.

== Function ==
Male flies with mutations in the fruitless gene display altered sexual behavior. Fruitfly courtship, which involves a complex male-initiated ritual, may be disrupted in many ways by mutated fru alleles; fru is necessary for every step in the ritual. Some alleles prevent courting entirely, while others disrupt individual components. Notably, some loss-of-function alleles change or remove sexual preference.

Although many genes are known to be involved in male courtship behavior, the fruitless gene has been considered noteworthy because it exhibits sex-specific alternative splicing. When females produce the male-spliced gene product, they behave as males. Males that do not produce the male-specific product do not court females and are infertile. In the brain, a subset (ca. 2,000) of neurons express fruitless and fruitless expression is sufficient to instruct sexually dimorphic connectivity.

fruitless has at least four promoters, each encoding proteins containing both a BTB (Broad complex/tramtrack/bric-a-brac) domain and a zinc finger motif. Alternative splicing occurs at both the 5' and 3' ends, and there are several variants (other than the male- and female-specific splicing patterns). The fruitless gene locus also controls the expression of hundreds of other genes, any subset of which may actually regulate behavior.

== Name ==
Early work refers to the gene as fruity, an apparent pun on both the common name of D. melanogaster, the fruit fly, as well as a slang word for homosexual. As social attitudes towards homosexuality changed, fruity came to be regarded as offensive, or at best, not politically correct. Thus, the gene was re-dubbed fruitless, alluding to the lack of offspring produced by flies with the mutation. However, despite the original name and a continuing history of misleading inferences by the popular media, fruitless mutants primarily show defects in male-female courtship, though certain mutants cause male-male or female-female courtship.
