= John Dollard =

American psychologist and social scientist (1900–1980)

- Born: August 19, 1900; Menasha, Wisconsin, US
- Died: October 8, 1980 (aged 80); New Haven, Connecticut, US
- Education: University of Washington (B.A., 1922); University of Chicago (Ph.D., 1931)
- Scientific career
- Fields: Psychology, Social Science
- Workplaces: Yale University

John Dollard (29 August 1900 – 8 October 1980) was an American psychologist and social scientist known for his studies on race relations in America and the frustration-aggression hypothesis he proposed with Neal E. Miller and others.

== Life and education ==
Dollard was born in Menasha, Wisconsin in 1900. He studied commerce and English at the University of Wisconsin and received his B.A. in 1922. He then earned his Ph.D. in sociology at the University of Chicago in 1931. Dollard also studied psychoanalysis at the Berlin Institute from 1931 to 1932. He later returned to the states and taught anthropology at Yale University. He became a research associate at the new Institute of Human Relations while teaching at Yale, and with Neal E. Miller, a fellow researcher at the Institute of Human Relations, Dollard served as a consultant to the Morale Services Division of the U.S. Department of War. He continued to teach at Yale though and later became a professor of psychology in 1952. Dollard retired from Yale in 1969, becoming professor emeritus, until his death in 1980 in New Haven, Connecticut.

== Career ==
Dollard's personal research was focused on the sociological issues of race relations and social class, as well as exploring biographical analyses, suggesting what should be included in biographical materials to permit sound psychological studies, researching various topics related to sociology and culture, and psychoanalysis.

According to his research, much can be predicted without knowing anything about the individual by simply having knowledge of the culture into which the person is born. He realized that sociological variables, such as social class and culture, influence a person's particular learning experiences.

Unlike most psychoanalysts at the time, Dollard recognized the importance of considering actual human social conditions rather than just abstract psychological principles constructed in a laboratory setting. These ideas and practices led him to write one of his most influential works, Caste and Class in a Southern Town, the now classic sociological study of race relations in the Deep South.

From 1941 to 1945 he also studied fear and morale in modern warfare, which culminated in several reports, including Fear and Courage under Battle Conditions (1943) and "Fear in Battle" (The Infantry Journal, 1944).

However, Dollard is likely best known within the psychological community as a member of the distinguished group of young researchers (among whom was Neal E. Miller) at Yale University in the 1930s who, inspired initially by Clark L. Hull, sought to combine learning theory and psychoanalysis. The groups' first major publication was Frustration and Aggression, and has become a classic which is still widely cited in introductory texts. It outlined a view, now referred to as the frustration-aggression hypothesis, which formed the basis for later developments such as Leonard Berkowitz's Aggression: A Social Psychological Analysis (1962) and the animal research on frustration and aggression in the 1960s and 1970s, which caused a controversy between the researchers and animal rights groups. Miller sums up Dollard's contributions to the group as such: "If trying to bring together contributions from sociology, anthropology, psychology, and psychotherapy no longer seems so novel, it is because Dollard and other pioneers had the courage and tenacity to break through traditional barriers".

== Publications ==
- Dollard, J. Criteria for the life history, with analysis of six notable documents. New Haven : Published for the Institute of Human Relations by Yale University Press, 1935.
- Dollard, John. Caste and Class in a Southern Town. New Haven: Yale University Press, 1937.
- Dollard, John, Leonard W. Doob, Neal E. Miller, Orval H. Mowrer and Robert R. Sears. Frustration and Aggression. New Haven: Yale University Press, 1939.
- Dollard, J. & Davis, A. Children of bondage : the personality development of Negro youth in the urban south. Washington, D.C.: American Council on Education, 1940.
- Dollard, J., & Miller, N. Social learning and imitation. New Haven : Published for the Institute of Human Relations by Yale University Press, 1941.
- Dollard, J. Fear in Battle. Yale University Press, 1943.
- Dollard, J. The acquisition of new social habits. In R. Linton (Ed.), The science of man in the world crisis (pp. 442–464). New York : Columbia University Press, 1945.
- Dollard, J. Anniversary Papers of the Community Service Society: The Family in a Democratic Society. Columbia University Press, 1949.
- Dollard, John and Neal E. Miller. Personality and Psychotherapy: An Analysis in Terms of Learning, Thinking, and Culture. New York: McGraw-Hill, 1950.
- Dollard, John. Steps in Psychotherapy. New York: Macmillan, 1953.
