= Frustration =

Common emotional response to opposition

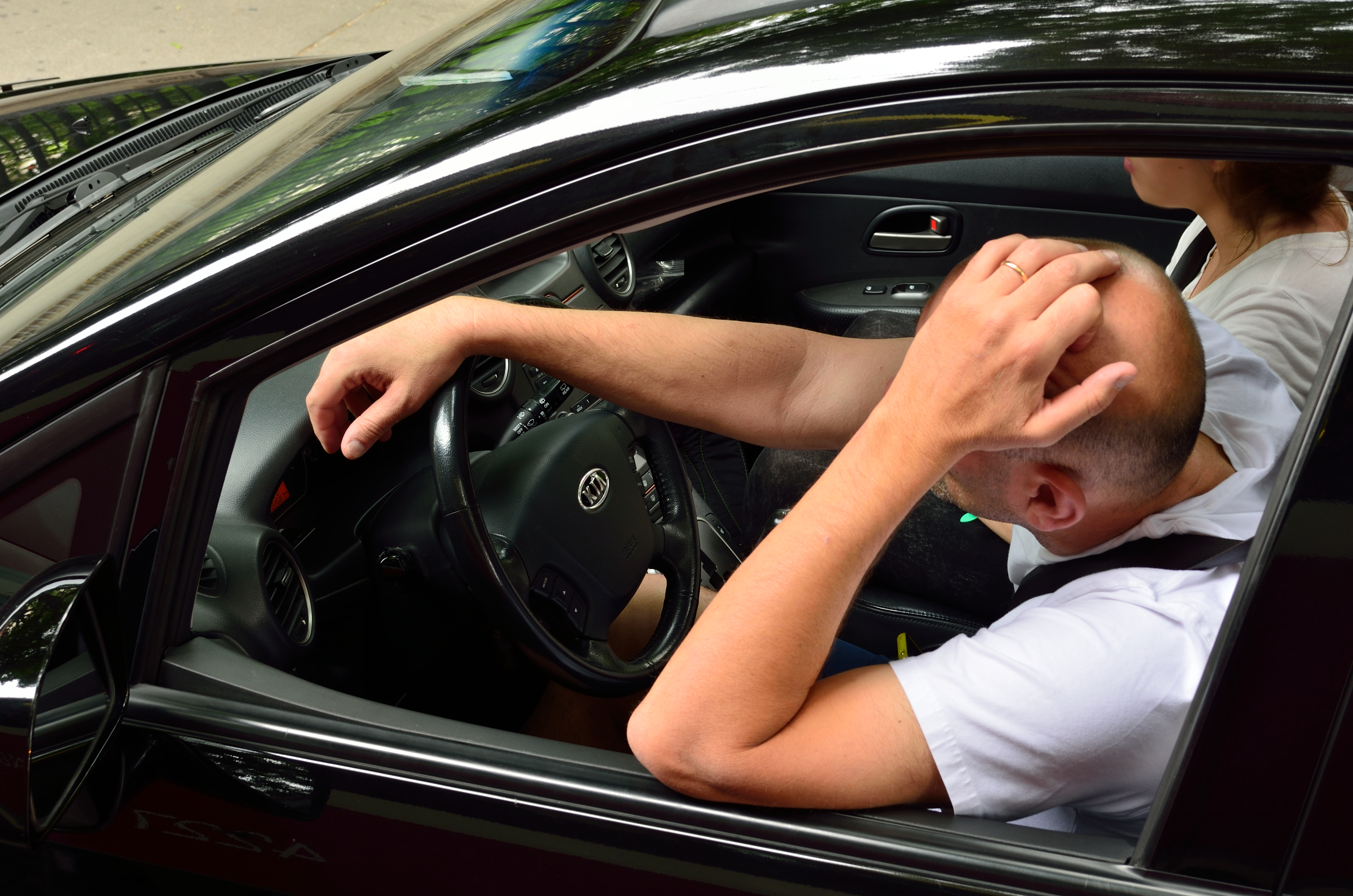
A frustrated man sitting in a traffic jam

In psychology, frustration is a common emotional response to opposition, related to anger, annoyance and disappointment. Frustration arises from the perceived resistance to the fulfillment of an individual's will or goal and is likely to increase when a will or goal is denied or blocked. There are two types of frustration: internal and external. Internal frustration may arise from challenges in fulfilling personal goals, desires, instinctual drives and needs, or dealing with perceived deficiencies, such as a lack of confidence or fear of social situations. Conflict, such as when one has competing goals that interfere with one another, can also be an internal source of frustration or annoyance and can create cognitive dissonance. External causes of frustration involve conditions outside an individual's control, such as a physical roadblock, a difficult task, or the perception of wasting time. There are multiple ways individuals cope with frustration such as passive–aggressive behavior, anger, or violence, although frustration may also propel positive processes via enhanced effort and striving. This broad range of potential outcomes makes it difficult to identify the original cause(s) of frustration, as the responses may be indirect. However, a more direct and common response is a propensity towards aggression.

== Causes ==
Frustration originates from feelings of uncertainty and insecurity which stem from a sense of inability to fulfill needs. If the needs of an individual are blocked, uneasiness and frustration are more likely to occur. When these needs are constantly ignored or unsatisfied, anger, depression, loss of self-confidence, annoyance, aggression, and sometimes violence are likely to follow. Needs can be blocked two different ways; internally and externally. Internal blocking happens within an individual's mind, either through lack of ability, confidence, conflicting goals and desires, and/or fears. External blocking happens to an individual outside their control such as physical roadblocks, difficult tasks, or perceived waste of time, especially when those roadblocks or challenges were unexpected, or if the individual expected the goal to be easy to accomplish. Frustration is usually less when an individual expected, or knew beforehand, that the goal would be "challenging."

Some people are predisposed towards feelings of frustration, measured by childhood temperament, and adult neuroticism.

Frustration can be classed as a mental health problem–response behavior and can have a number of effects, depending on the mental health of the individual. In positive cases, this frustration will build until a level that is too great for the individual to contain or allow to continue, and thus produce action directed at solving the inherent problem in a disposition that does not cause social or physical harm. In negative cases, however, the individual may perceive the source of frustration to be outside their control, and thus the frustration will continue to build, leading eventually to further problematic behavior (e.g. violent reaction against perceived oppressors or enemies).

Stubborn refusal to respond to new conditions affecting the goal, such as removal or modification of the barrier, sometimes occurs. As pointed out by J.A.C. Brown, severe punishment may cause individuals to continue non-adaptive behavior blindly: "Either it may have an effect opposite to that of reward and as such, discourage the repetition of the act, or, by functioning as a frustrating agent, it may lead to fixation and the other symptoms of frustration as well. It follows that punishment is a dangerous tool, since it often has effects which are entirely the opposite of those desired".

== Frustration tolerance ==
Frustration tolerance is one's ability to resist becoming frustrated when facing difficult tasks. Having a low frustration tolerance is related to trait anger and a higher level of frustration tolerance is related to lower levels of anger and longer persistence on difficult tasks. For example, a child with a high frustration tolerance may be able to deal with repeated challenges and failures without experiencing significant frustration. The child with a low frustration tolerance can be quick to experience frustration when asked to perform tasks of moderate difficulty.

== See also ==
- Aggression
- Depression
- Disappointment
- Frustration–aggression hypothesis
