= Neal E. Miller =

American psychologist and academic (1909–2002)

- Born: August 3, 1909; Milwaukee, Wisconsin, U.S.
- Died: March 23, 2002 (aged 92); Hamden, Connecticut, U.S.
- Education: University of Washington (BS); Stanford University (MS); Yale University (PhD)
- Known for: Biofeedback, Frustration–aggression hypothesis
- Awards: Newcomb Cleveland Prize (1956); APA Distinguished Scientific Contribution Award (1959); National Medal of Science (1964); APA Award for Lifetime Contributions to Psychology (1991); Wilbur Cross Medal (1967)
- Scientific career
- Fields: Psychology
- Workplaces: Yale University; Rockefeller University; Cornell University Medical College

Neal Elgar Miller (August 3, 1909 – March 23, 2002) was an American experimental psychologist. Described as an energetic man with a variety of interests, including physics, biology and writing, Miller entered the field of psychology to pursue these. With a background training in the sciences, he was inspired by professors and leading psychologists at the time to work on various areas in behavioral psychology and physiological psychology, specifically, relating visceral responses to behavior.

Miller's career in psychology started with research on "fear as a learned drive and its role in conflict". Work in behavioral medicine led him to his most notable work on biofeedback. Over his lifetime he lectured at Yale University, Rockefeller University, and Cornell University Medical College and was one of the youngest members of Yale's Institute of Human Relations. His accomplishments led to the establishment of two awards: the New Investigator Award from the Academy of Behavioral Medicine Research and an award for distinguished lectureship from the American Psychological Association. A Review of General Psychology survey, published in 2002, ranked Miller as the eighth most cited psychologist of the 20th century.

== Life and education ==
Miller was born in Milwaukee, Wisconsin, in 1909. He grew up in the Pacific Northwest. His father, Irving Miller, worked at Western Washington University as chair of the Department of Education and Psychology. His father's position, in Neal Miller's words, "may have had something to do with" his interest in psychology. Originally having a curiosity for science, Miller entered the University of Washington (1931), where he studied biology and physics and also had an interest in writing. In his senior year, he decided that psychology would allow him to pursue his wide variety of interests. He graduated from the University of Washington with a B.S. and a piqued interest in behavioral psychology. After baccalaureate studies, he studied at Stanford University (1932), where he received his M.S. and an interest in psychology of personality. At Stanford, he accompanied his professor, Walter Miles, to the Institute of Human Relations at Yale University as a research assistant. There he was encouraged by another professor to further study psychoanalysis. He received his Ph.D. degree in psychology from Yale University in 1935, and that same year he became a social science research fellow at the Institute of Psychoanalysis in Vienna for one year before returning to Yale as a faculty member in 1936. He spent a total of 30 years at Yale University (1936–1966), and in 1950 he was appointed professor at Yale, a position he held until 1966. In 1966 he began teaching at Rockefeller University and afterwards spent the early 1970s teaching at Cornell University Medical College. In 1985 he returned to Yale as a research associate.

== Career ==
Miller's early work focused on experimenting with Freudian ideas on behavior in real-life situations. His most notable topic was fear. Miller came to the conclusion that fear could be learned through conditioning. Miller then decided to extend his research to other autonomic drives, such as hunger, to see if they worked in the same way. His unique ideas and experimental techniques to study these autonomic drives resulted in findings that changed ideas about motivations and behavior.

Miller was also one of the founding fathers behind the idea of biofeedback. Today, many of his ideas have been expanded and added to, but Miller has been credited with coming up with most of the basic ideas behind biofeedback. Miller was doing experimentation on conditioning and rats when he discovered biofeedback.

Neal Miller, along with John Dollard and O. Hobart Mowrer, helped to integrate behavioral and psychoanalytic concepts. They were able to translate psychological analytic concepts into behavioral terms that would be more easily understood. Specifically, they focused on the stimulus-response theory. These three men also recognized Sigmund Freud's understanding of anxiety as a "signal of danger" and that some things in Freud's work could be altered to fix this. Miller, Dollard and Mowrer believed that a person who was relieved of high anxiety levels would experience what is called "anxiety relief". Together with fellow psychologist O. Hobart Mowrer, Miller gives his name to the "Miller-Mowrer Shuttlebox" apparatus.

Over the course of his career, Miller wrote eight books and 276 papers and articles. Neal Miller worked with John Dollard and together they wrote the book Personality and Psychotherapy (1950) concerning neurosis and psychological learning concepts.

== Controversy ==
Miller's use of laboratory animals brought criticism from the animal rights movement but he defended the practice, arguing that if people had no right to use animals in research, then they had no right to kill them for food or clothing. He nevertheless acknowledged the complexity of the issue; "there is sacredness of all life. But where do we draw the line? That's the problem. Cats kill birds and mice. Dogs exploit other animals by killing and eating them. Humans have to draw the line somewhere in animal rights, or we're dead."

== Honours ==
In 1958, Miller was elected to the United States National Academy of Sciences. Miller served as president of the American Psychological Association from 1960–61, and received the APA Distinguished Scientific Contribution Award in 1959 and the APA Citation for Outstanding Lifetime Contribution to Psychology in 1991. In 1964 he received the National Medal of Science from President Johnson, the first psychologist to receive this honor. Miller is a distinguished member of PSI CHI International Honor Society for Psychology. In 1967, he received the Wilbur Cross Medal. He was a member of both the American Academy of Arts and Sciences and the American Philosophical Society.

He was also President of the Society for Neurosciences, the Biofeedback Society of America and the Academy of Behavioral Medicine Research.

== Major works ==
=== Books ===
- Dollard, John; Doob, Leonard William; Miller, Neal E.; Mowrer, Orval Hobart; Sears, Robert R. (1939). Frustration and aggression. New Haven: Published for the Institute of Human Relations by Yale University Press. OCLC 256003.
- Miller, Neal E; Dollard, John (1941). Social learning and imitation. New Haven: Published for the Institute of Human Relations by Yale University Press. OCLC 180843.
- Miller, Neal E. (1947). Psychological research on pilot training. Aviation psychology program research reports. Vol. 8. Washington, DC: U.S. Government Printing Office. OCLC 1473614.
- Dollard, John; Miller, Neal E. (1950). Personality and psychotherapy: an analysis in terms of learning, thinking, and culture. McGraw-Hill publications in psychology. New York: McGraw-Hill. OCLC 964374.
- Miller, Neal E. (1957). Graphic communication and the crisis in education. Washington, DC: Department of Audio-Visual Instruction, National Education Association. OCLC 242913.
- Miller, Neal E. (1971). Neal E. Miller: selected papers. Psychonomic perspectives. Chicago: Aldine, Atherton. ISBN 978-0202250342. OCLC 133865. Republished as:
  - Miller, Neal E. (2007) [1971]. Learning, motivation, and their physiological mechanisms. New Brunswick, NJ.: AldineTransaction. ISBN 9780202361437. OCLC 144328310.
  - Miller, Neal E. (2008) [1971]. Conflict, displacement, learned drives, and theory. New Brunswick, NJ: AldineTransaction. ISBN 9780202361420. OCLC 156810019.
- Richter-Heinrich, Elisabeth; Miller, Neal E., eds. (1982). Biofeedback: basic problems and clinical applications. Selected revised papers presented at the XXIInd International Congress of Psychology, Leipzig, GDR, July 6–12, 1980. Amsterdam: North-Holland. ISBN 978-0444863454. OCLC 10751840.

=== Selected articles ===
- Sears, Robin R.; Hovland, Carl I.; Miller, Neal E. (1940). "Minor studies of aggression: I. Measurement of aggressive behavior". The Journal of Psychology: Interdisciplinary and Applied. 9 (2): 275–294. doi:10.1080/00223980.1940.9917694.
- Miller, Neal E.; Bugelski, Richard (1948). "Minor studies of aggression: II. The influence of frustrations imposed by the in-group on attitudes expressed toward out-groups". The Journal of Psychology: Interdisciplinary and Applied. 25 (2): 437–442. doi:10.1080/00223980.1948.9917387. PMID 18907295.
- Miller, Neal E. (February 1948). "Studies of fear as an acquirable drive: I. Fear as motivation and fear-reduction as reinforcement in the learning of new responses". Journal of Experimental Psychology. 38 (1): 89–101. doi:10.1037/h0058455. PMID 18910262.
- Miller, Neal E. (September 1951). "Comments on theoretical models: illustrated by the development of a theory of conflict behavior". Journal of Personality. 20 (1): 82–100. doi:10.1111/j.1467-6494.1951.tb01514.x. PMID 14898432.
- Miller, Neal E. (20 December 1957). "Experiments on motivation: studies combining psychological, physiological, and pharmacological techniques". Science. 126 (3286): 1271–1278. doi:10.1126/science.126.3286.1271. PMID 13495454.
- Miller, Neal E. (16 April 1965). "Chemical coding of behavior in the brain". Science. 148 (3668): 328–338. Bibcode:1965Sci...148..328M. doi:10.1126/science.148.3668.328. PMID 14261527. S2CID 32100966.
- Miller, Neal E. (31 January 1969). "Learning of visceral and glandular responses". Science. 163 (3866): 434–445. Bibcode:1969Sci...163..434M. doi:10.1126/science.163.3866.434. PMID 5812527.
- Weiss, Jay M.; Glazer, Howard I.; Pohorecky, Larissa A.; Brick, John; Miller, Neal E. (December 1975). "Effects of chronic exposure to stressors on avoidance-escape behavior and on brain norepinephrine". Psychosomatic Medicine. 37 (6): 522–534. doi:10.1097/00006842-197511000-00006. PMID 711. S2CID 21404657.
- Miller, Neal E. (1978). "Biofeedback and visceral learning". Annual Review of Psychology. 29: 373–404. doi:10.1146/annurev.ps.29.020178.002105. PMID 341785.
- Miller, Neal E. (April 1985). "The value of behavioral research on animals". American Psychologist. 40 (4): 423–440. doi:10.1037/0003-066X.40.4.423. PMID 3890636.
- Taub, Edward; Crago, Jean E.; Burgio, Louis D.; Groomes, Thomas E.; Cook, Edwin W.; DeLuca, Stephanie C.; Miller, Neal E. (March 1994). "An operant approach to rehabilitation medicine: overcoming learned nonuse by shaping". Journal of the Experimental Analysis of Behavior. 61 (2): 281–293. doi:10.1901/jeab.1994.61-281. PMC 1334416. PMID 8169577.
