= Digit Cancellation Test =

Test in diagnosing Alzheimer's disease

- Purpose: used for diagnosis of Alzheimer's disease

A neuropsychological test used in the diagnosis of Alzheimer's disease. The subject gets one of more digits s/he has to cross out from a list of numbers. The resulting score consists of the correctly crossed out numbers minus the incorrectly crossed out numbers.
