= Robert Richardson Sears =

American child psychologist (1908–1989)

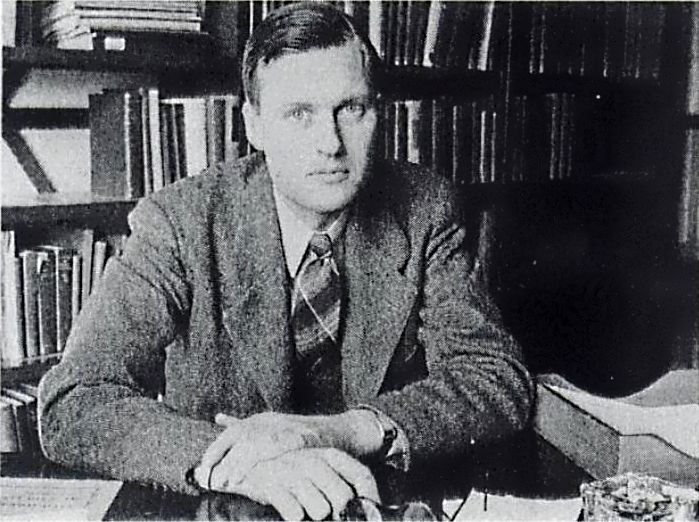
- Photograph of Sears from the 1940s
- Born: August 31, 1908; Palo Alto, California, United States
- Died: May 22, 1989 (aged 80); Menlo Park, California
- Scientific career
- Fields: Child psychology
- Workplaces: Stanford University
- Thesis: A Neurological Study Of Conditioned Responses In Goldfish (1932)
- Doctoral advisor: Harold Saxton Burr
- Doctoral students: Juliet Popper Shaffer

Robert Richardson Sears (/sɪərz/; August 31, 1908 – May 22, 1989) was an American psychologist who specialized in child psychology and the psychology of personality. He was the head of the psychology department at Stanford and later dean of the School of Humanities and Sciences there, continued the long-term I.Q. studies of Lewis Madison Terman at Stanford, and authored many pivotal papers and books on various aspects of psychology.

== Early life ==
He was born in Palo Alto, California to Jesse Brundage Sears, a professor at Stanford University, and Stella Louise (Richardson) Sears. As a child Sears attended Palo Alto Union High School. He received his Artium Baccalaureus degree from Stanford in 1929 and a Ph. D. from Yale University in 1932. He was married on June 25, 1932, to Pauline Kirkpatrick Snedden, who co-authored a book with him and with whom he shared the APA gold medal for achievement in psychology late in their lives.

== Professional life ==
After leaving Yale, Sears was first an instructor in psychology at the University of Illinois Chicago from 1932 to 1936 and at the same time was a clinical psychologist at the Institute for Juvenile Research there. He returned to Yale as an associate professor of psychology in 1936 and remained there until 1942.

From 1942 until 1949 he was director of the Iowa Child Welfare Research Station at the University of Iowa. Sears focused on the personalities of children and the different socialization pressures parents place on their child. He also said that the root of personalities in children stemmed from their family. Sears became the first person to have the child's own parent present in the experiments conducted. He wrote two books, Patterns of Child Rearing (1957) and Identification and Child Rearing (1965), where he explained some of his findings on the personality of a child. Sears established many research centers and institutions that allowed students and colleagues to study further. One of Sears' biggest achievements was founding the Bing Nursery School. This was a model preschool with a research facility for the child development unit at Stanford.

From 1949 until 1953 he directed the Laboratory of Human Development at the Harvard Graduate School of Education.

In 1953 Sears returned to Stanford where he served as chair of the Psychology department until 1961, Dean of the School of Humanities and Sciences from 1961 to 1970, and David Starr Jordan Professor of Psychology from 1970 until 1975. At Stanford, Sears did studies using the Terman sample of gifted children. He was very involved in follow-up studies of the group of gifted children that had begun by Lewis Terman in 1922. He had taken on the responsibility of working with these individuals after Terman's death in 1956. Sears found a national planning committee that investigated later maturity in these children. He said that the earlier records could predict development in the later years of life. He followed 700 people over 60 years. He did this with the help of his systematic recording that he created to capture large amounts of previously unexamined material and coded it. This was the first archive in the history of psychology. Many psychologists and researchers today use this method. Robert and his wife, Pauline, published a set of papers on the late-life careers of gifted children based on the Terman study. These papers were named, The Gifted in Later Maturity.

Sears was president of the American Psychological Association in 1951. He was elected to the American Academy of Arts and Sciences in 1956 and the American Philosophical Society in 1962.

== Select works ==
- Frustration and aggression (1939, with John Dollard, Leonard William Doob, Neal Elgar Miller, Orval Hobart Mowrer, ISBN 0-313-22201-0)
- Survey of objective studies of psychoanalytic concepts (1943, Social Science Research Council, ISBN 0-313-21249-X)
- Patterns of child rearing (1957, Eleanor E. Maccoby, Harry Levin, Edgar L. Lowell, Pauline Snedden Sears, and John W. M. Whiting, Jean Berwick, ISBN 0-8047-0916-5)
- Identification and child rearing (1966, Lucy Rau Ferguson, Ram Dass, ISBN 0-422-98500-7)
- Seven Ages of Man (June 1973, S. Shirley Feldman, ISBN 978-0-913232-06-4)
- Your ancients revisited: A history of child development (1975, ISBN 978-0-226-33154-6)
