= Orval Hobart Mowrer =

American professor of psychology

Orval Hobart Mowrer (January 23, 1907 – June 20, 1982) was an American psychologist and professor of psychology at the University of Illinois from 1948 to 1975 known for his research on behaviour therapy. Mowrer practiced psychotherapy in Champaign-Urbana and at Galesburg State Research Hospital. In 1954 Mowrer held the position of president of the American Psychological Association. Mowrer founded Integrity Groups (therapeutic community groups based on principles of honesty, responsibility, and emotional involvement) and was instrumental in establishing GROW groups in the United States. A Review of General Psychology survey, published in 2002, ranked Mowrer as the 98th most cited psychologist of the 20th century.

== Early life and education ==
Mowrer spent his early years on the family farm near Unionville, Missouri. His father retired from farming and moved the family to town when Hobart reached school age. The death of the elder Mowrer when Hobart was 13 changed his life radically. A year later he suffered the first in a series of major depressions which would recur throughout his life. Nevertheless, he did well in high school and entered the University of Missouri in 1925. Having decided on psychology as a career, he became laboratory assistant to the university's first and only psychology professor, Max Friedrich Meyer. Meyer had earned a PhD in physics before emigrating from Germany in the 1890s and was a rigorous behaviorist. Although Mowrer's initial hope was that psychology would help him to understand himself and his own problems, he readily adapted to Meyer's behavioral approach. Mowrer began his college years as a conservative Christian, but lost his faith as he adopted progressive and scientific views prevalent in academia.

In his senior year, as a project for a sociology course, Mowrer composed a questionnaire to investigate sexual attitudes among students. It was distributed anonymously and the responses were to be returned anonymously. The questionnaire was accompanied by a letter from a non-existent "Bureau of Personnel Research" which began:

Dear University Student:
During the last several decades it has become increasingly apparent that there is something seriously wrong with the traditional system of marriage in this country. But, unfortunately, the whole matter has been so inextricably bound up with religious dogmas, moral sentiments, and all manner of prudish conventionalities as to make it exceedingly difficult to ascertain with any degree of accuracy the precise reasons for this situation.

There were slight differences in wording between the questionnaires sent to women and those sent to men, but each contained 11 groups of questions requesting the student's opinions about illicit sexual relations, whether the student would marry a person who had engaged in sexual relations, how s/he would react to unfaithfulness in marriage, whether s/he had engaged in sex play as a child or sexual relations as an adult, and whether s/he would favor the legal establishment of "trial marriage" or "companionate marriage."

Some of the students sent the questionnaires on to their parents, who complained to the administration. Two faculty members were aware of the questionnaire and allowed it to be distributed, sociology professor Harmon O. DeGraff and psychology professor Max Friedrich Meyer, although neither had read the cover letter. Ultimately both men lost their jobs, and Meyer never held an academic position again. The American Association of University Professors censured the University for violation of academic freedom, in the first such action taken by the AAUP.

The scandal had little impact on Mowrer's career. He left the university without a degree in 1929 (the degree was granted a few years later), entering Johns Hopkins University, where he worked under Knight Dunlap. Mowrer's PhD research involved spatial orientation as mediated by vision and the vestibular receptors of the inner ear, using pigeons as subjects. During his time at Johns Hopkins he also underwent psychoanalysis for the first time, in an attempt to resolve another episode of depression. After completing his doctorate in 1932 he continued his work on spatial orientation as a post-doctoral fellow at Northwestern University and then Princeton University.

== Yale, then Harvard ==
Academic positions were scarce during the Great Depression, so in 1934 Mowrer began a Sterling Fellowship at Yale University researching learning theory. Yale psychology was then dominated by the stimulus-response approach of Clark Hull. Mowrer's wife, Willie Mae (Molly) had been a fellow student at Hopkins and remained there as an instructor for several years after Mowrer left. When she moved to New Haven, Connecticut, the couple served as houseparents at a residential home for infants and children. Mowrer used the home as an informal behavioral science laboratory. He and his wife developed the first bedwetting alarm while working there.

In 1936, Mowrer was hired by the Yale Institute of Human Relations, then a relatively new project funded by the Rockefeller Foundation, as an instructor. The institute was designed to integrate psychology, psychoanalysis and the social sciences. One product of the institute's unique approach was a detailed study of aggression by sociologist John Dollard with psychologists Mowrer, Leonard Doob, Neal Miller and Robert Sears. Each of the five contributors had training in psychoanalysis or had been individually psychoanalyzed, but the language of the book reflected the objective behaviorism of the day.

During the late 1930s Mowrer began experimenting with the use of electric shock as a conditioning agent. At the time, most psychologists agreed with William James that fear (in this usage, synonymous with anxiety) was an instinctive response. Mowrer suspected fear was a conditioned response and designed a way to create fear in the laboratory. The unusually generous funding available at the institute allowed him to use human subjects for the first time. The subjects were attached to galvanic skin response recorders and to electrodes which could deliver an electric shock. They were then exposed to a light stimulus which was sometimes (randomly) followed by a shock. Mowrer discovered two unexpected phenomena. There was a substantial galvanic stress response to the first presentation of the light stimulus, before any shock had been administered. The anticipation was apparently more aversive than the shock, which would not have been predicted by traditional behavioral theory. Mowrer also noticed that after each shock the subjects experienced a marked degree of relaxation. Together with fellow psychologist Neal Miller, Mowrer gives his name to the "Miller-Mowrer Shuttlebox" apparatus.

Using animals in similar experiments, he found that a cycle could be produced in which the subject became more and more responsive to conditioning. He concluded that anxiety was basically anticipatory in nature and ideally functions to protect the organism from danger. However, because of the circumstances of conditioning, the degree of fear is often disproportionate to the source. Anxiety can be created artificially, and relief of anxiety can be used to condition other behaviors. Mowrer's term for the state of expectancy produced by carefully timed aversive stimuli was the "preparatory set," and it was foundational to his later thinking in both learning theory and clinical psychology.

In 1940 Mowrer became Assistant Professor at the Harvard Graduate School of Education. While there, he became involved with Henry A. Murray and his group at the Harvard Psychological Clinic. Mowrer, Murray, Talcott Parsons, Gordon Allport and others formed a group which eventually led to the formation of the Harvard Department of Social Relations, partially in response to the success of the Yale Institute of Human Relations.

During this time Mowrer's faith in Freudian theory was fading. His primary professional loyalty had always been to learning theory, but he continued to assume that neurotic symptoms and depression were best addressed through analysis. His first psychoanalyst had treated him for only a few months. When his depression returned he underwent a second, much lengthier analysis and felt that he was much improved. His symptoms soon returned, leading him to question Freud's premises. In spite of his doubts he underwent a third analysis during the time he was at Harvard, this time with the prominent Freudian disciple Hanns Sachs.

== War work ==
In 1944 Mowrer became a psychologist at the Office of Strategic Services developing assessment techniques for potential intelligence agents. Mowrer's experience with the laboratory induction of psychological stress, along with the work of other psychologists, was utilized to construct an environment in which recruits could be assessed for their ability to withstand highly stressful situations.

As part of his work there, he participated in a seminar led by Harry Stack Sullivan. Sullivan's theories on the role of disturbances in interpersonal relationships with "significant others" in the etiology of mental disorders had a profound effect on Mowrer's thinking. When Mowrer returned to Harvard, he began counseling students in addition to his faculty duties. He used the principles he had learned from Sullivan, questioning them about their interpersonal relationships and confronting them when he felt they were being dishonest.

== Move to Illinois ==
In 1948, Hobart Mowrer accepted a research-only position at the University of Illinois and moved to Urbana, Illinois with Molly and their three young children. He was now involved with two essentially separate lines of work, learning theory and clinical psychology. Mowrer's primary achievements in learning theory followed from his work with aversive conditioning or avoidance learning. He formulated a two-factor learning theory, arguing that conditioning (sign learning) is distinct from habit formation (solution learning). This theory was initially described in a 1947 paper. In the 1950s he modified the theory to allow for only one type of learning but two types of reinforcement.

Mowrer's interest in clinical psychology was primarily a hobby during the 1950s, but it would eventually eclipse his work as a learning theorist. He had given up on psychoanalysis after 1944, partially as a result of the failure of his own analysts to cure his problems. Most importantly, Harry Stack Sullivan had persuaded him that the key to mental health lay in healthy, scrupulously honest human relationships, not in intrapsychic factors. Mower took Sullivan's ideas to heart and confessed to his wife some guilty secrets concerning his adolescent sexual behavior, and that he had had an affair during the marriage. She was upset, but convinced (as was Mowrer) that those secrets might explain his bouts of depression. The depressive symptoms did remain in remission for eight years.

In 1953, at the height of his career and on the eve of accepting the presidency of the American Psychological Association, he suffered the worst psychological collapse of his life. He was hospitalized for three and a half months with depression complicated by symptoms resembling psychosis. Few effective treatments were available. A few years later, Mowrer was successfully treated with one of the first tricyclic antidepressants.

== Religious views ==
During most of Mowrer's adult life he had no involvement with religion. He recognized that his theories about the importance of guilt were similar to traditional religious ideas, but he had arrived at his convictions through a secular process and the religious concepts of guilt and sin did not at first interest him. Freud, in Mowrer's view, had made a fatal error in attributing emotional distress to inappropriate guilt. Mowrer had concluded that mental disorders, including even schizophrenia, were the result of real, not imagined, guilt. Mowrer did not see this as a religious issue. He had been raised to associate religion with "otherworldly" values, with the relationship of individuals to God, and his own focus was on the relationship of individuals to one another.

In 1955 Mowrer read a religious novel which changed his thinking. His daughter was reading Magnificent Obsession by Lloyd C. Douglas and told her father that it might interest him. Mowrer was impressed by Douglas' thesis, expressed through a fictional character, that the Bible was a superb handbook of human relations. A central theme of the novel is a secret shared by a small group of people who have found great spiritual and material success. It is derived from Jesus' suggestion to "do alms in secret", not letting anyone know. In the book, however, good deeds done in secret invest the characters with almost magical power. Mowrer turned the concept around to place the emphasis on the pathological potential of misdeeds when they are kept secret. He summed it up the phrase, "You are your secrets," sometimes reworded as "You are as sick as your secrets."

After reading other fictional and non-fictional works by Lloyd Douglas, who had left the Congregationalist ministry to devote himself to writing, Mowrer became a member of the Presbyterian Church. He was soon disappointed. He had condemned psychoanalysis for being soft on sin, and now he found that the church was dominated by similar permissive assumptions. It was not only the modernist influences in churches to which Mowrer objected, however, but some traditional beliefs such as the doctrine of justification by faith. He set out to restore to churches the consciousness of personal sin and guilt he felt they had lost. He was able to acquire funding from the Lilly Endowment for a fellowship in morality and mental health. The program brought students from seminaries and divinity schools (among others, Jay E. Adams) to Champaign-Urbana, where they learned Mowrer's counseling and group techniques.

== Integrity therapy ==
After Mowrer's positive experiences as a result of his disclosures to his wife in 1945, he began to counsel students using several simple premises: that neurotic people often are being deceptive in some way with people they care about; that they suffer from conscience pangs but resist or repress the prompting of the conscience; and that this causes their symptoms. When Mowrer was counseling someone who could not be induced to confess anything of significance, he would "model" confession for them by disclosing something from his own life. Group therapy was coming into fashion, and although most groups were dominated by the same psychotherapeutic ideas Mowrer had rejected, he saw hope of using groups in a way that would increase the opportunities for confession and emotional involvement.

In a 1972 article detailing the procedures of the groups, Mowrer described the intake interviews as "very unlike a social case-work interview" and "more like those followed in intakes at Synanon or Daytop." The prospect was first put at ease by "sharing" offered by the interviewers. Committee members would then zero in on some point on which the person seemed to be evasive, inconsistent or defensive. If the person immediately "came clean" to the satisfaction of the committee, s/he would be rewarded with verbal approval and admission to the group. If any resistance was shown, there would be further confrontation, then deliberation by the committee in the presence of the prospective member. According to Mowrer it was rare for someone to be flatly turned down, although they might be asked to seek help elsewhere (with a "psychiatrist of our choice") and come back when they were able to be honest as defined by the group.

Meetings lasted at least three hours. No one could leave before the three hours were up, and anyone who walked out during a "run" (i.e. while the target of group confrontation) was permanently excluded from the group. Any language was acceptable, including profanity and yelling, but no physical violence or threat thereof. Feelings were to be expressed in "gut-level" language and verbal aggression was common. Embraces and physical expressions of affection were also common. All significant details of member's everyday lives were to be shared with the group, and members had contracts detailing steps they would take toward honesty and restitution. These agreements were recorded in a "commitment book" and the member had to answer to the group for any failure to keep a commitment.

Mowrer dropped the term "Integrity Therapy" in favor of "Integrity Groups," to avoid the impression that it was possible to outgrow the need for Group attendance. He considered membership in an Integrity Group to be a lifelong commitment (members were shuffled among groups to avoid fixed relationships). Criticism of the Integrity Group concept centered on Mowrer's negativity about human nature, and the questionable value of investing a group with supreme authority over one's life.

When it was suggested that his techniques resembled brain-washing, Mowrer repeated the response of Charles Dederich (as quoted by Yablonsky) to a similar question: "Yes, that's right, we do engage in a good deal of 'brain-washing.' Most of the people who come here have very dirty brains, and we try to clean them up a bit!" Eugene May noted with respect to this remark that the people entering Synanon generally had severe drug problems and were alienated from family and community, while most participants in Mowrer's community and university groups were leading fairly normal lives.

== Later years ==
The popularity of Integrity Groups faded during the 1970s. Mowrer's techniques in fact were to have a substantial legacy in the alcohol and drug rehabilitation field, but community groups did not last. Mowrer recognized the irony of this. Opposition to professionalism in therapy had been a guiding principle for both Molly and Hobart Mowrer and for years they resisted the temptation to sponsor formal training in I.G. leadership. Times were changing, however, and it seemed that the only future available for Mowrer's approach was in the hands of paid professionals. He did continue to have some non-professional influence through the Grapevine articles he wrote for Alcoholics Anonymous, an organization he very much admired.

Hobart Mowrer was an advocate of the idea that mental illness has a substantial biological and genetic basis. He held this conviction in spite of his equally strong belief in the importance of the "pathogenic secret." Mowrer accepted the importance of biological factors at a time when many people did not, and was in this respect ahead of his time. He regarded his own affliction as in some sense a "gift," the driving force behind his innovative ideas, but also the great misery of his life.

Mowrer had hoped to remain professionally active in retirement, but circumstances forced him to slow down shortly after he retired in 1975. Molly became seriously ill and he developed medical problems of his own. Molly's death in 1979 was a great loss, and also left him with few responsibilities. He had accepted that his periodic depressions would never be entirely cured, and had long held the opinion that suicide was a reasonable choice in some circumstances. He died by suicide in 1982 at the age of 75.
