= Leonard Berkowitz =

American social psychologist

Leonard Berkowitz (August 11, 1926 – January 3, 2016) was an American social psychologist best known for his research on altruism and human aggression. He originated the cognitive neoassociation model of aggressive behavior, which was created to help explain instances of aggression for which the frustration-aggression hypothesis could not account.

Berkowitz received his Ph.D. in Psychology from the University of Michigan in 1951. He served on the faculty at the University of Wisconsin–Madison from 1955 to 1989. During that period, he also held visiting appointments at Cambridge, Cornell, Oxford, and Stanford Universities. At the time of death, he was a Vilas Research Professor Emeritus in the Department of Psychology at the University of Wisconsin–Madison. During his lifetime, including as recently as two months prior to his death, he authored of over 170 articles, books, and textbooks on psychology. A Review of General Psychology survey, published in 2002, ranked Berkowitz as the 76th most cited psychologist of the 20th century.

On January 3, 2016, Berkowitz died at Oakwood Village in Madison, Wisconsin after a brief undisclosed illness at the age of 89.

== Awards and honors ==
- 1988 APA Distinguished Scientific Award for the Applications of Psychology
- 1989 SESP Distinguished Scientist Award
- 1993 Fellow of the American Academy of Arts and Sciences
- 1993 APS James McKeen Cattell Fellow Award

== Books ==
- Berkowitz, L. (2000). Causes and consequences of feelings. New York: Cambridge University Press.
- Berkowitz, L. (1993). Aggression: Its causes, consequences, and control. New York: McGraw-Hill.
- Berkowitz, L. (1975). A Survey of Social Psychology. Hinsdale: Dryden Press.
- Berkowitz, L. (1962). Aggression: a social psychological analysis. New York: McGraw-Hill.

== See also ==
- Aggression
- Frustration aggression theory
- Weapons effect
