= Social Foundations of Thought and Action =

1986 book by Albert Bandura

Social Foundations of Thought and Action: A Social Cognitive Theory
- Author: Albert Bandura
- Language: English
- Genre: Psychology; educational Psychology
- Publisher: Prentice Hall;
- Publication date: 1986
- Pages: 617
- ISBN: 978-0-13-815614-5
- OCLC: 12080269

Social Foundations of Thought and Action: A Social Cognitive Theory is a landmark work in psychology published in 1986 by Albert Bandura. The book expands Bandura's initial social learning theory into a comprehensive theory of human motivation and action, analyzing the role of cognitive, vicarious, self-regulatory, and self-reflective processes in psychosocial functioning. Bandura first advanced his thesis of reciprocal determinism in Social Foundations of Thought and Action.

The book was originally published in the United States in 1986. Translations have been published in Chinese, Russian, and Spanish. The book has been reviewed and discussed in several professional social science journals, and widely cited in the professional literatures of psychology, sociology, and other fields.

== Topics covered ==
Social Foundations of Thought and Action: A Social Cognitive Theory contains 10 chapters:

1. Models of Human Nature and Causality.
2. Observational Learning.
3. Enactive Learning.
4. Social Diffusion and Innovation.
5. Predictive Knowledge and Forethought.
6. Incentive Motivators.
7. Vicarious Motivators.
8. Self-Regulatory Mechanisms.
9. Self-Efficacy.
10. Cognitive Regulators.

It also contains a preface, author and subject indices, and a 60-page reference section. The preface explained that:

For convenience... theories need to be given summary labels [and] the theoretical approach presented in this volume is usually designated as social learning theory [although] the scope of this approach has always been much broader than its descriptive label, which is becoming increasing ill-fitting.... [and] is further compounded because several theories with dissimilar postulates—Dollard and Miller's drive theory, Rotter's expectancy theory, and Patterson's conditioning theory—all bear the social learning label. In the interest of more fitting and separable labeling, the theoretical approach of this book is designated as social cognitive theory. The social portion of the terminology acknowledges the social origins of much human thought and action; the cognitive portion recognizes the influential causal contribution of thought processes to human motivation, affect, and action. (p. xii)

== Reviews and influence ==
Reviews have appeared in Contemporary Psychology, the Academy of Management Review, and Contemporary Sociology. It was also the focus of a special section in the inaugural issue of Psychological Inquiry.

In Contemporary Psychology, Robert A. Baron wrote that in his view, the book "is a work of great significance to the field" and has a "high (sometimes dazzling) level of sophistication [that] is apparent not only in the theoretical perspective but also in the extremely broad scope of the volume." The book

is so filled with intriguing findings and challenging hypotheses that several generations of researchers will undoubtedly be needed to assess its full potential.... For more than a century, psychologists have searched for a "grand theory" of human behavior—one that will provide a comprehensive, accurate, and usable account of this complex and fascinating topic.... social cognitive theory does not yet provide such an account, [but I] discern in its great breadth and sophistication outlines of the grand theory we seek.

In the Academy of Management Review, Edwin A. Locke wrote that

this is a brilliant and important book that should be required reading for all doctoral students in organizational behavior, human resource management and industrial-organizational psychology... I also recommend it to organizational researchers and consultants. It is a classic that will be cited for decades to come.

In a special section in the 1990 inaugural issue of Psychological Inquiry, John F. Kihlstrom and Judith M. Harackiewicz wrote that

Publication of Albert Bandura's Social Foundations of Thought and Action... was a significant event in the history of the scientific study of personality. It provides a detailed account of the acquisition of knowledge and skills relevant to personality and social interaction, provides a new perspective on motivational issues of longstanding interest, and offers an overarching framework for integrating personality and social psychology.... Bandura is a central figure in the movement away from static conceptualizations of personality in terms of types and traits, toward a more dynamic view that emphasizes the interaction between the person and his or her social environment.... his book marks the furthest departure yet made by social learning theory from its sources in behaviorism...

Also in that special section, Richard M. Lerner,developmental psychologist, began by quoting several key ideas from Bandura's book, and wrote that "the set of ideas quoted at the outset of this article would not be seen as especially new to contemporary developmental psychologists." However, he went on to state that

what makes the quoted ideas quite significant and in fact provocative... is that they are not written by a developmental psychologist [but by] Albert Bandura, one of this country's most deservedly acclaimed personality and social psychologists. Bandura's (1986) book... is a major statement.... Given Bandura's scientific stature... of scholarly contributions so seminal that its substance is obligatory knowledge for all people seeking training in psychology... his book is, then, an event of major historical importance in the study of personality and social psychology, and indeed for the discipline as a whole. By so insistently weaving development into the very fabric of the phenomena studied by personality and social psychologists, Bandura's book signals the end of one era, of one way of "doing business," in these areas of psychology, and sets the stage for the beginning of quite a different one.

In a third commentary in that special section, Donald H. Meichenbaum wrote that he "concur[red] totally" with Baron's assessment of Bandura's book as "a sophisticated, eloquent, ambitious attempt to provide a 'grand theory' of human behavior." He further suggested that "there is little that is not offered to illustrate the potential of social cognitive theory.... If the American Psychological Association is ever asked to contribute to a time capsule to illustrate what has preoccupied psychologists in the 1970s and early 1980s, I heartily recommend Bandura's book." However, Meichenbaum also wrote that "the conceptual framework and language of social cognitive theory can be seductive. Caution is required! Perhaps, the best place to highlight the need for such caution is in the context of a homage." He expressed cautions with regard to three issues:

- Nature of self-efficacy theory. "Is the 'grand theory' merely an expression of common sense?" "The concept of perceived self-efficacy carries a heavy burden in explaining so many diverse behaviors. When does explaining too much mean that one is not really explaining any one thing well?" (Meichenbaum extensively quoted Smedslund.)
- Broader implications. Meichenbaum found Bandura's "discussion of the nature of the social foundations of thought and action to be somewhat narrow [so he] challenge[s] Bandura and other social cognitive theorists to consider the implications of the works of Baldwin (1894), Mead (1934), Bakhtin (Morson, 1986), Vygotsky (1978), Wertsch (1985), and Rogoff (1982), each of whom has written thoughtfully about the social formulation of the mind."
- Role of cognitive structures. "It is with regard to cognitive structures... that social cognitive theory is weakest.... Bandura [refers] to 'knowledge structures, beliefs, scripts, stereotypes, and prototypes' (p. 218). Are these equivalent concepts?... [I predict] that as social cognitive theorists embrace the challenging task of understanding the nature of cognitive structures and affective themes, the supposed barriers between social learning theorists and psychodynamically oriented theorists will break down."

In a reply that was published with these three commentaries in Psychological Inquiry, Bandura responded to what he called "several puzzling misconstruals of social cognitive theory" in Meichenbaum's commentary. Bandura stated that "two chapters examine how... knowledge structures are acquired through observational learning, inferences from exploratory experiences, information conveyed by tuition, and innovative cognitive syntheses of preexisting knowledge," and that "ecumenical appeals for unification of social cognitive and psychodynamic theories go unsupported by any empirical evidence for the superiority of the theoretical hybridization." Bandura responded to the other two reviews, which he called "thoughtful," by expanding on the nature of triadic reciprocal causation, on the "interdependence of [psychological] process and structure," and on how self-efficacy is defined and measured with respect to particular domains of functioning and skill. He noted that "a major current movement in psychology is away from vague, omnibus cognitive structures to more domain-linked competencies."

Outside of the psychology literature, in Contemporary Sociology, Spencer E. Cahill wrote that

Bandura may not deliver the comprehensive and interdisciplinary theory of the Social Foundations of Thought and Action that he promises in the preface, but he does advance the cause. His conception of the person, his analysis of the cognitive processes implicated in the acquisition and performance of behavior, and his devastating criticisms of a number of theoretical perspectives are all important contributions.

However, Cahill also criticized the book on several grounds. He expressed concern that

Bandura's excursions across disciplinary boundaries are far too circumscribed. For example, while the person of Bandura's social cognitive theory closely resembles the... person of the Meadian sociological psychology, Bandura ignores this entire tradition.... His list of the various ways in which the person "disengages" internal control bears a striking resemblance to Sykes and Matza's "Techniques of Neutralization" (1957), yet there is no reference to this.... [and] Although Bandura's model of triadic reciprocality suggests that the environment and behavior recursively determine one another, he is apparently unaware of... the numerous analyses by symbolic interactionists, ethnomethodologists, and other sociologists.

Cahill also expressed concern that Bandura "closely scrutinizes empirical studies for technical flaws if their results are inconsistent with his theoretical analysis, but he does not apply the same exacting standards to studies that do support his arguments. While this is to be expected, the reader must be familiar with the research under review in order to adequately evaluate the empirical evidence that Bandura marshals."

== Editions ==
The original and only English-language edition was published in the US in 1986 by Prentice Hall. Several foreign (non-English) editions have also been published. The English, Chinese and Spanish editions are:

- Bandura, Albert (1986). Social Foundations of Thought and Action: A Social Cognitive Theory. Englewood Cliffs, NJ: Prentice Hall. ISBN 978-0-13-815614-5.
- Bandura, Albert Bandura (& Ying Lin, trans.) (2001). 思想和行动的社会基础: 社会认知论 (Si xiang he xing dong de she hui ji chu: She hui ren zhi lun) (Social Foundations of Thought and Action, Chinese). Shanghai: 华东师范大学出版社 (Hua dong shi fan da xue chu ban she). ISBN 978-7-5617-2770-6. ISBN 7-5617-2770-4, OCLC 50519981 (2 volume set, 34 & 964 pages)
- Bandura, Albert (María Zaplana, trans.) (1987). Pensamiento y acción: Fundamentos sociales. Barcelona, Spain: Martínez Roca. ISBN 978-84-270-1162-5. ISBN 84-270-1162-8, OCLC 503227218 (651 pages)
- Бандура А. Теория социального научения. — СПб.: Евразия, 2000. — 320 с. ISBN 5-8071-0040-9

Bandura has stated that a Russian translation has also been published.

== See also ==
- Timeline of psychology
