= Eleanor Rosch =

Professor of psychology

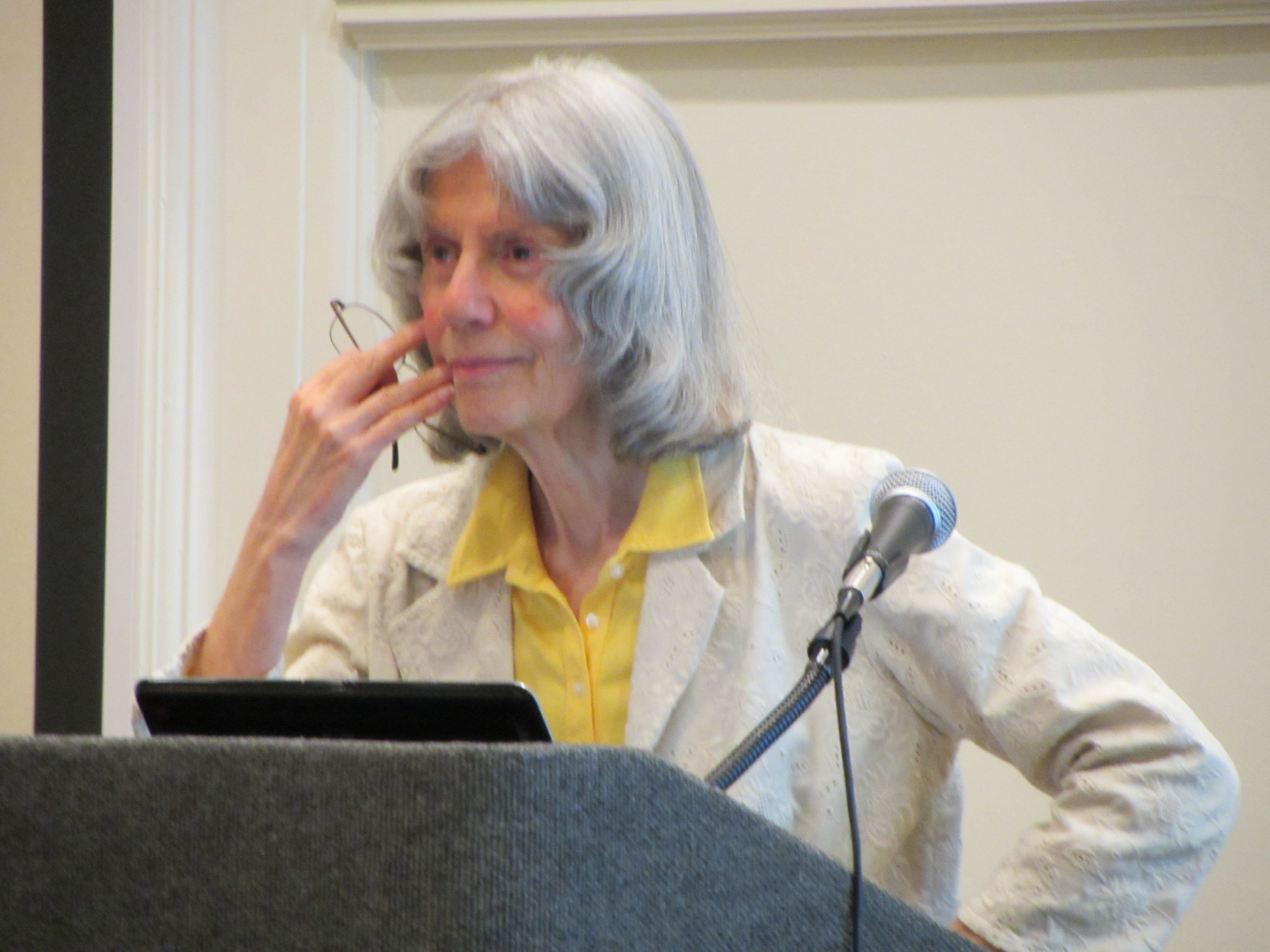
- Rosch in 2012
- Born: 9 July 1938 (age 88)
- Other name: Eleanor Rosch Heider
- Education: Reed College (BA); Harvard University (PhD)
- Scientific career
- Fields: Cognitive science, psychology
- Workplaces: University of California, Berkeley; Brown University; Connecticut College

Eleanor Rosch (once known as Eleanor Rosch Heider; born 9 July 1938) is an American psychologist. She is a professor of psychology at the University of California, Berkeley, specializing in cognitive psychology and primarily known for her work on categorization, in particular her prototype theory, which has profoundly influenced the field of cognitive psychology.

Throughout her work Rosch has conducted extensive research focusing on a range of topics, including semantic categorization, mental representation of concepts, and linguistics. Her research interests include cognition, concepts, causality, thinking, memory, and cross-cultural, and Eastern and religious psychology. Her more recent work in the psychology of religion has sought to show the implications of Buddhism and contemplative aspects of Western religions for modern psychology.

== Early life and education ==
Rosch was born in New York City, the daughter of an English teacher from England and a mother who was a Russian refugee. She completed an undergraduate philosophy thesis at Reed College on Wittgenstein, who she said "cured her of studying philosophy."

After school, she served as a social worker in Portland for several years, returning later to Harvard to study clinical psychology at the then-Department of Social Relations. Rosch delivered a paradigm-changing doctoral thesis at Harvard about category formation, under the direction of Roger Brown. After a short stint at Brown University and Connecticut College, Rosch joined the Department of Psychology at University of California, Berkeley in 1971.

== Research ==
From field experiments Rosch conducted (alongside her then-husband Karl Heider) in the 1970s with the Dani people of Papua New Guinea, she concluded that when categorizing an everyday object or experience, people rely less on abstract definitions of categories than on a comparison of the given object or experience with what they deem to be the object or experience best representing a category ("prototype").

Although the Dani lack words for all the English colors (their language contained only two color terms dividing all colors into either the "light, bright" category or the "dark, cool" category), Rosch showed that they could still categorize objects by colors for which they had no words. She argued that basic objects have a psychological import that transcends cultural differences and shapes how such objects are mentally represented. She concluded that people in different cultures tend to categorize objects by using prototypes, although the prototypes of particular categories may vary.

Rosch contributed to multiple scholarly works of taxonomic analysis of objects based on these prototype ("chair") and subordinate terms ("tall black leather chair"). She inferred that overuse of subordinate terms could be attributed to the attitude of snobbery and elitism.

Her work has been often referenced by that of computer vision and deep learning researcher Aude Oliva, who has built upon Rosch's object classifications to teach computers to recognize basic scenes instantly interpreted by humans.

== Publications ==
=== Books ===
- 1978 (with Lloyd, B., eds). Cognition and Categorization. Hillsdale NJ: Lawrence Erlbaum Associates.
- 1991 (with Francisco Varela and Evan F. Thompson). The Embodied Mind. MIT Press.

=== Book chapters ===
- 1973, "On the Internal Structure of Perceptual and Semantic Categories." In T. Moore (ed.), Cognitive Development and the Acquisition of Language, New York: Academic Press, 1973.
- 1974, Linguistic relativity. In: E. Silverstein (ed.) Human Communication: Theoretical Perspectives, Hillsdale, NJ: Lawrence Erlbaum.
- 1977, "Human Categorization" in Warren, Neil, ed., Advances in Cross-Cultural Psychology 1: 1-72. Academic Press.
- 1983, "Prototype classification and logical classification: The two systems" in Scholnick, E., New Trends in Cognitive Representation: Challenges to Piaget's Theory. Hillsdale, NJ: Lawrence Erlbaum Associates: 73–86

=== Papers ===
==== Categorization and prototype theory ====
- Rosch, E.H. (1973). "Natural categories". Cognitive Psychology. 4 (3): 328–50. doi:10.1016/0010-0285(73)90017-0.
- Rosch, R.H. (1975). "Cognitive reference points". Cognitive Psychology. 7 (4): 532–47. doi:10.1016/0010-0285(75)90021-3. S2CID 54342276.
- 1975, "Cognitive representation of semantic categories," Journal of Experimental Psychology 104(3): 192–233.
- Rosch, E.H.; Mervis, C.B.; Gray, W.D.; Johnson, D.M.; Boyes-Braem, P. (1976). "Basic objects in natural categories". Cognitive Psychology. 8 (3): 382–439. CiteSeerX 10.1.1.149.3392. doi:10.1016/0010-0285(76)90013-X. S2CID 5612467.
- Mervis, C.B.; Rosch, E. (1981). "Categorization of Natural Objects". Annual Review of Psychology. 32: 89–113. doi:10.1146/annurev.ps.32.020181.000513.

==== Psychology of religion ====
- Eleanor Rosch (2002). "How to catch James's mystic germ: Religious experience, Buddhist meditation and psychology". Journal of Consciousness Studies. 9 (9–10): 37–56. ISSN 1355-8250.
- Eleanor Rosch (2003). "The basis of compassion: Western science in dialog with the Dalai Lama". PsycCRITIQUES. 48 (3): 330–332. doi:10.1037/000807. ISSN 1554-0138.
- Eleanor Rosch (2007). "More than mindfulness: When you have a tiger by the tail, let it eat you". Psychological Inquiry. 18 (4): 258–264. doi:10.1080/10478400701598371. ISSN 1047-840X. S2CID 144196114.
- Eleanor Rosch & Eman Fallah (2007). "Science and religion, Dalai Lama style". PsycCRITIQUES. 52 (20): np. doi:10.1037/a0007895. ISSN 1554-0138.

== Awards and recognition ==
Rosch is a Fellow of the Cognitive Science Society. She has mediated several discussions with the Dalai Lama.

== See also ==
- Categorization
- Cognitive science
- Embodied mind
- Grand Valley Dani language
- Prototype theory
