= Theories of media exposure =

Theories of media exposure study the amount and type of Media content an individual is exposed to, directly or indirectly. The scope includes television shows, movies, social media, news articles, advertisements, etc. Media exposure affects both individuals and society as a whole.

Theories such as the Uses and Gratifications Theory, Social Learning Theory, and Cultivation theory offer insights into how individuals learn from media, how media shapes people’s perceptions of reality, and how media satisfies individuals' needs. Research influences what content is produced, what content is consumed, and how media is used to achieve different goals, both positive and negative.

== Specific theories ==
=== Uses and Gratifications Theory ===
One of the most popular theories, Uses and Gratifications Theory, is based on users actively attempting to satisfy their media needs. Elihu Katz is often credited with being one of the original creators of this theory. This theory states that an individual will choose the media or form of media that will satisfy their desires most completely. There are a number of different desires involved with this theory, such as a desire for information or social interaction. When seeking to fulfill these desires, an individual will need to make a decision. This decision making process if the primary interest for the theorists. When comparing social networking websites, it is simply a matter of preference at the time. However the decision making process becomes more convoluted when deciding between watching a movie, playing a game online, or reading a newspaper. The same fundamental principle applies however, the person will make the decision based on what brings the most gratification.

Communication behavior is goal-directed, purpose-driven, and motivated in U & G. People use communication to satisfy their needs or desires while the media competes with other forms of communication. Zizi Papacharissi Ph.D. & Andrew L. Mendelson Ph.D. explain in their study “An Exploratory Study of Reality Appeal: Uses and Gratifications of Reality TV Shows,” how Reality television appeals to people through instrumental and ritualistic media use. Instrumental use is connected to uses of the medium and is related to greater exposure to informational programming and perceiving content to be realistic. The historical context behind participatory programming and the appeal of reality TV, led to confessional women's magazines in the early 20th century, Mass Marketing strategies of women's magazines in the interwar years, the growth of talk and daytime radio, and the emergence of the TV talk show, game show, and other reality genres.

Reality television programs were more likely to fulfill voyeuristic and companionship needs among those with low mobility and low interpersonal interaction. Critics argue that reality TV poses a new common denominator for television content, promotes models of questionable social validity, and provides relatively inexpensive entertainment. The growing popularity of reality programming raises the question of its utility and consequences for audiences. Individuals watch reality and consider how social and psychological antecedents influence reality TV viewing from a user’s and gratification perspective.

=== Social Learning Theory ===
Social Learning Theory, similar to Uses and Gratifications Theory, is based on the gratification of an individual, but differs in that it is based more on behavior rather than decision making. Albert Bandura is said to be the forerunner of this theory. Each individual will make decisions based on anticipation. There is a heavy reliance on previous experience knowing what leads to gratification and what will not. If one receives joy from watching comedies, then an individual will seek out comedies in the future. If horror films leave a person with nightmares then they will most likely attempt to avoid them. This theory also states that the experience of others can be used in the decision making process. If a family member recommends a book then an individual is more likely to pick up the book and read it themselves. This theory does address more thoroughly media avoidance than does Uses and Gratifications Theory.

=== Social Cognitive Theory ===
In the 1960s, Albert Bandura's seminal Bobo doll experiment catalyzed Social Cognitive Theory (SCT), previously called Social Learning Theory. Since then, SCT has been a compelling explanation of observational learning and social modeling. A controversial perspective that goes against dominant behaviorist views argues that environmental and personal factors may contribute to or influence behavior and determine it. As a result of SCT's triadic reciprocal model, "individual agency and social structure operate together as code determinants,” influencing each other in mutually reinforcing ways. Based on the agentic perspective, SCT identifies people as reactive to the external environment and internal forces and capable of self-organization and self-regulation.

=== Cultivation Theory ===
Cultivation theory argues that media can shape our perceptions of reality by presenting a consistent and repetitive message over time. It suggests that heavy exposure to media, particularly television, can lead to a "cultivation" of a particular set of beliefs.

Cultivation theory was proposed by George Gerbner in the 1960s. This theory focuses on how the amount of television that is taken in impacts the perceptions and attitudes of the watcher. Gerbner argued that the more television taken in by the viewer, the more their views of the world reflect what they are shown through the media. He compared his studies between two groups of people who were similar when it came to demographics, but the main difference between the groups was that one regularly watched television and the other did not. This theory focuses on the long-term effects of television and how the messages being portrayed can cultivate in people's lives. Gerbner believed that television has the ability to impact how people think about certain concepts but he did not believe that television has the ability to alter the concepts that people believe in. He states that people have preconceived notions about certain concepts and that they utilize the content viewed on television to build on these notions and confirm the truth of them.

==== Criticisms ====
Gerbner's theory of cultivation has been criticized for being too simplistic. Certain critics believe that the major issue with this theory is that Gerbner does not take content differences into account. He also focused his studies mainly on the fictional side of television which is leaving out a large portion of the content shown on television. Another criticism related to this one is that it is somewhat inapplicable in the 21st century. Since this theory was originally adapted in the 1960s, the content that was shown while he conducted his studies differ greatly from the content shown in the year 2020.

== Current research ==
The original idea of the cultivation theory is still being researched and developed. There are over 600 studies that work to expand on ’s theory which have been published in the past three decades. One example of a more recent study was done by Minnebo and Eggermont in 2007 where they found the presentation of drugs on television led to many believing younger adults and teens are largely substance abusers. Other studies focus on the presentation of sexuality Calzo and Ward, 2009, race Busselle & Crandall, 2002, and political views Glynn, Huge, Reineke, en. al., 2007 in television and how stereotypes and representation can alter people’s opinions about other groups when they are exposed to them frequently.
