= Self-Efficacy (book) =

Book

Self-Efficacy: The Exercise of Control
- Author: Albert Bandura
- Language: English; trans. to Chinese, French, Italian, and Korean
- Genre: Psychology
- Publisher: W. H. Freeman;
- Publication date: 1997
- Pages: 604
- ISBN: 978-0-7167-2850-4
- OCLC: 36074515

Self-Efficacy: The Exercise of Control is a psychology book written by Albert Bandura in 1997 on self-efficacy, i.e. a person's belief in their own competence. The book addresses issues ranging from theoretical discussions to developmental analyses. Translations have been published in Chinese, French, Italian, and Korean.

The book has been reviewed and discussed in several professional social science journals, and widely cited in the professional literatures of psychology, sociology, medicine, and management.

== Topics covered ==
Self-Efficacy: The Exercise of Control contains 11 chapters.

The first five chapters provide conceptual background and review overall empirical support for the importance of self-efficacy, and how it interacts with other psychological phenomena:
1.	Theoretical Perspectives (pp. 1–35)	Presents the book's view of nature of human agency. "Thought processes are not only emergent brain activities, they also exert determinative influence," and "reflecting on one's own functioning entails shifting the perspective of the same agent.... One is just as much an agent when one is reflecting on one's experiences and exerting self-influence as when one is executing courses of action." Bandura argues that "It is the height of irony when people who exercise the liberties guaranteed by institutions of freedom denigrate freedom as an illusion," and that "A fervent environmental determinist urging people to change their environment is amusingly self-negating." The chapter also presents Bandura's view of human agency as operating in the context of three-way mutual influence between internal personal factors, behavior, and the external environment, a view called "triadic reciprocal causation" The chapter also distinguishes self-efficacy from related constructs such as self-concept, self-esteem, effectance motivation, outcome expectancies, and self-guidance by envisioned possible selves. and other control beliefs such as locus of control.
2.	The Nature and Structure of Self-Efficacy (pp. 36–78)	Describes perceived self-efficacy perceptions as "a key factor in a generative system of human competence." These perceptions are "concerned not with the number of skills you have, but with what you believe you can do with what you have under a variety of circumstances." In the "standard methodology" for measuring efficacy beliefs, "individuals are presented with items portraying different levels of task demands, and they rate the strength of their belief in their ability to execute the requisite activities. The items are phrased in terms of can do rather than will do." Self-efficacy is domain-specific and multidimensional, and beliefs vary according to strength and robustness in the face of perturbing events, level of task challenge, and generality across wide ranges of activities.
3.	Sources of Self-Efficacy (pp. 79–115)	Four main sources of self-efficacy are described, including enactive mastery experience, vicarious experience, verbal persuasion, physiological and affective states.
4.	Mediating Processes (pp. 116–161)	Four separate subsections describe theory and evidence for how cognitive, motivational, affective, and selection processes may mediate influences on outcomes of interest from self-efficacy perceptions, or "the processes through which efficacy beliefs produce their effects." These processes are viewed as usually operating "in concert, rather than in isolation, in the ongoing regulation of human functioning."
5.	Developmental Analysis of Self-Efficacy (pp. 162–211)	The books fifth chapter describes developmental origins of a sense of personal agency and the associated self-efficacy perceptions. These include familial sources of self-efficacy, schools, peer influences and other sources of broadened validation, and the influence of transitional experiences of adolescence. It also describes concerns about self-efficacy in adulthood, and how self-efficacy perceptions may be reappraised with advancing age.
The final six chapters focus on the relevance of self-efficacy to several specific areas of human functioning:
6.	Cognitive Functioning.
7.	Health Functioning.
8.	Clinical Functioning.
9.	Athletic Functioning.
10.	Organizational Functioning.
11.	Collective Efficacy.

It also contains a preface, author and subject indices, and a 48-page reference section. The preface explained that

Much contemporary theorizing depicts people as onlooking hosts of internal mechanisms orchestrated by environmental events. They are stripped of any sense of agency. People are proactive, aspiring organisms who have a hand in shaping their own lives and the social systems.... This book explores the exercise of human agency through people's beliefs in their capabilities... It reviews in considerable detail the origins of efficacy beliefs, their structure, the processes through which they affect human well-being and accomplishments, and how these processes can be developed and enlisted for human betterment. (p. vii)

== Reception ==
Reviews have appeared in Contemporary Psychology, the Journal of Cognitive Psychotherapy, Personnel Psychology, the British Journal of Clinical Psychology, the Educational Administration Quarterly, and the International Journal of Selection and Assessment.

In Contemporary Psychology, James E. Maddux wrote that "Bandura's aim is to 'document the many ways in which efficacy beliefs operate in concert with other socio-cognitive determinants in governing human adaptation and change' (p. vii). He succeeds totally. While covering a remarkable number and array of topics, the book moves logically from the general to the specific.... Although the book is scholarly in purpose and tone throughout, it is liberally sprinkled with humor and, more important, wisdom.... [and] offers numerous suggestions for improving our personal lives and restructuring our social, political, and educational institutions and numerous insights into the nature of personal and social change" He also wrote that "the final chapter on collective efficacy.... is the most thought-provoking chapter in the book and deserves the widest possible readership. I hope Bandura will consider writing a volume based on this chapter for a general audience, for it offers ideas and insights that could become part of our general social and political discourse."

In the Journal of Cognitive Psychotherapy, Richard Lightsey wrote that one may "enter the term 'self-efficacy' in the on-line PSYCLIT database and you will find over 2500 articles, all of which stem from the seminal contributions of Albert Bandura.... Self-Efficacy: The Exercise of Control is the best attempt so far at organizing, summarizing, and distilling meaning from this vast and diverse literature," and that "Self-Efficacy is one of the most significant books of the last 50 years. It is essential reading for psychologists and will also be of immense value to teachers, school administrators, corporate managers, coaches, psychotherapists, vocational counselors, and indeed to anyone interested in enhancing motivation, self-management, and performance." Lightsey's 9-page review contained subsections on both strengths and weaknesses. Strengths included that

While incorporating prior works such as Social Learning Theory... and "Self-efficacy mechanism in human agency"... Sef-Efficacy extends these works by describing results of diverse new research, clarifying and extending social cognitive theory, and fleshing out implications of the theory for groups, organizations, political bodies, and societies.... [and] masterfully contrasts social cognitive theory with many other theories of human behavior.... Throughout, Bandura's clear, firm, and self-confident writing serves as the perfect vehicle for the theory he espouses.

With regard to limitations, Lightsey stated that Bandura's "usually deft prose sometimes bogs down in phrases such as 'subordinately acquiescent' (p. 29) and 'preeminently exalting' (p. 29)." and that there is "considerable redundancy both within and across chapters," with the latter "the inevitable result of organizing chapters by content area – much research is relevant to more than one chapter." Furthermore, "despite Bandura's cautions, it remains to be seen whether his very fruitful theory may be stretched to encompass psychological traits, subjective well-being, and other general but highly meaningful aspects of human life" that are "not referenced in the text."

In Personnel Psychology, Edwin A. Locke wrote that "Bandura does everything that an inductive theory builder should do." Locke provided a list of 12 such accomplishments of the book – for example, "7. He discusses the causes of self-efficacy (e.g., enactive mastery, role modeling, persuasion, etc.) and shows, in detail, how these causes operate." Locke stated that "No self-respecting I/O psychologist or OB scholar should fail to read this book," adding that "I consider Albert Bandura's Social Cognitive Theory to be one of the greatest achievements in the history of psychology."

In the British Journal of Clinical Psychology, Gillian Butler wrote that "There is hardly a single aspect of life, personal, social, cultural or political, that Albert Bandura does not attempt to consider in some depth – and for which he cannot cite a wealth of research relevant to his general model of self-efficacy.... Much that would otherwise have to be sought for at length has been brought together in one volume, with the consequence that this is one of the weightiest theoretical books on a subject of such wide general interest... to be published this decade." She also stated that "This is a most impressive, comprehensive, wide-ranging – and long – book.... This is not a book for beginners."

In the Educational Administration Quarterly, Wayne K. Hoy wrote that "This book is a tour de force of scholarship; it is a book of theory grounded by research with clear practical implications." Hoy also cautioned that the reader should "make no mistake, this is a book for scholars and researchers; it is not light reading." He wrote that there "are many reasons" that administrators and students of educational administration would be interested in the book. Hoy listed 6 reasons before exploring them in detail (e.g., "a teacher's sense of self-efficacy is one of the few variables that is consistently related to student achievement"). Hoy concludes that "if the value of a theory is judged by the way it guides practice, then Bandura's theory of self-efficacy rates high. The work provides not only a wealth of insights but explicit guidelines on how to enable individuals to exercise control over their personal and professional lives.... Serious students of schools and administration should have a copy of this important work; in fact, I have two – one for home and one for school."

In the International Journal of Selection and Assessment, Anneke Vrugt wrote that the book is "interesting and readable [and] will be of interest to students in psychology and management at intermediate to advanced level[s]." Vrugt stated that she could "recommend [the book] to everyone who is concerned with this subject in research and practice." She stated that the book would have benefited by giving "more attention" to topics of the measurement of self-efficacy, construct validity, and predictive validity. She also stated that "Bandura makes his theory too comprehensive, when he assumes self-efficacy beliefs to function as determinants of all other motivation-related variables."

== Editions ==
The original and only English-language edition was published in the US in 1997 by W. H. Freeman. Several foreign (non-English) editions have also been published. The English, Chinese, French, Italian, and Korean editions are:

- Bandura, Albert (1997). Self-efficacy: The exercise of control. New York: W. H. Freeman. ISBN 978-0-7167-2850-4. ISBN 0-7167-2850-8, OCLC 36074515 (604 pages); ALSO: ISBN 978-0-7167-2626-5, ISBN 0-7167-2626-2
- Bandura, Albert Bandura (& Miu Xiaochun, trans.) (2003). 自我效能 : 控制的实施 (Zi wo xiao neng : kong zhi de shi shi) (Social Foundations of Thought and Action, Chinese). Shanghai: 华东师范大学出版社 (Hua dong shi fan da xue chu ban she). ISBN 978-7-5617-3464-3. ISBN 7-5617-3464-6, OCLC 77152536 (918 pages)
- Bandura, Albert (Jacques Lecomte, trans.) (2003) [2002]. Auto-efficacité: le sentiment d'efficacité personnelle. Paris, France: De Boeck Université. ISBN 978-2-7445-0098-5. ISBN 2-7445-0098-4, OCLC 55632839 or OCLC 419983248 or OCLC 690666494 (859 pages)
- Bandura, Albert (G.L. Iacono & R. Mazzeo, trans.) (2000). Autoefficacia. Teoria e applicazioni. Trento, Italy: Centro Studi Erickson. ISBN 978-88-7946-352-2. ISBN 88-7946-352-7, OCLC 636533639 (791 pages)
- Bandura, Albert (Yŏng-sin Pak, Uichol Kim, trans.) (2001). 자기 효능감과 삶의 질: 교육・건강・운동・조직에서의 성취 (Chagi hyonŭnggam kwa sam ŭi chil: kyoyuk, kŏnʼgang, undong, chojik esŏŭi sŏngchʻwi). Seoul, Korea: 교육 과학사, Sŏul Tʻŭkpyŏlsi : Kyoyuk Kwahaksa. ISBN 978-89-8287-525-0. ISBN 89-8287-525-5, OCLC 51879437 (732 pages)
