= Gordon Logan (psychologist) =

Gordon Logan is the Centennial Professor of Psychology at Vanderbilt University. A cognitive and mathematical psychologist, Logan is well known for his work on cognitive control and inhibition of cognitive and motor activity, divided attention and the nature of the human brain’s processing limitations, and the fundamental characterization of attention deficit hyperactivity disorder ADHD. He has also done extensive research on the hierarchical control of skilled copytyping, which he views as a useful model for hierarchically organized complex human skills in general. He collaborates on research that applies mathematical models to neural and behavioral data.

Logan received his BA and MSc from the University of Alberta in 1969 and 1972, and received his PhD from McGill University in 1975. He was on the faculty of Queen's University, University of Waterloo, University of Toronto, University of British Columbia, Purdue University, and the University of Illinois, Urbana-Champaign prior to joining the faculty at Vanderbilt.

According to Google Scholar, Logan’s work has been cited more than 33,000 times and he has an h index of 86 (as of 2017). He has been the recipient of many grants from the National Institutes of Health and the National Science Foundation. He is the Editor Emeritus of Cognitive Psychology.

== Honors ==
Logan was elected to membership in the Society of Experimental Psychologists. He is also an elected Fellow of the Association for Psychological Science. Logan received the Howard Crosby Warren Medal from the Society of Experimental Psychologists in 2014 and gave the Sir Frederic Bartlett Lecture to the Experimental Psychology Society in the UK in 2014 He was elected to the American Academy of Arts and Sciences in 2016 and received a Distinguished Scientific Contribution Award from the American Psychological Association in 2017. He was elected a foreign associate of the US National Academy of Sciences in April 2019.

== Inventions and discoveries ==
He is known for development of the Stop Signal paradigm which is generally cited as the standard method of studying cognitive inhibition in cognitive psychology and human cognitive neuroscience. "The stop-signal paradigm, is a popular experimental paradigm to study response inhibition."

He also developed the Instance Theory of Automatization which provides a potential account for basic mechanisms of skill acquisition.
