= Mathematical models of social learning =

Mathematical models of social learning aim to model opinion dynamics in social networks. Consider a social network in which people (agents) hold a belief or opinion about the state of something in the world, such as the quality of a particular product, the effectiveness of a public policy, or the reliability of a news agency. In all these settings, people learn about the state of the world via observation or communication with others. Models of social learning try to formalize these interactions to describe how agents process the information received from their friends in the social network. Some of the main questions asked in the literature include:

1. whether agents reach a consensus;
2. whether social learning effectively aggregates scattered information, or put differently, whether the consensus belief matches the true state of the world or not;
3. how effective media sources, politicians, and prominent agents can be in belief formation of the entire network. In other words, how much room is there for belief manipulation and misinformation?

== Bayesian model ==
Bayesian learning is a model which assumes that agents update their beliefs using Bayes' rule. Bayesian learning is often^{[when & by who]} considered the benchmark model for social learning, in which individuals use Bayes' rule to incorporate new pieces of information to their belief. Indeed, each agent's belief about different states of the world can be seen as a probability distribution over a set of opinions, and Bayesian updating assumes that this distribution is updated in a statistically optimal manner using Bayes' rule. Moreover, Bayesian models typically make certain demanding assumptions about agents, e.g., that they have a reliable model of the world and that the social learning rule of each agent is common knowledge among all members of the community.

More rigorously, let the underlying state be θ. This parameter could correspond to an opinion among people about a certain social, economic, or political issue. At first, each individual has a prior probability of θ which can be shown by P(θ). This prior could be a result of the agents' personal observations of the world. Then each person updates their belief by receiving some signal s. According to the Bayesian approach, the updating procedure will follow this rule:

$P(\theta|s) = \frac{P(s|\theta)}{P(s)} \cdot P(\theta)$

where the term $\textstyle P(s|\theta)$ is the conditional probability over signal space given the true state of the world.

== Critics to Bayes ==
It has been shown[] that such a Bayesian "update" is fairly sophisticated and imposes an unreasonable cognitive load on agents which might not be realistic for human beings.

Therefore, scientists have studied simpler non-Bayesian models, most notably the DeGroot model, introduced by DeGroot in 1974, which is one of the first models for describing how humans interact with each other in a social network. In this setting, there is a true state of the world, and each agent receives a noisy independent signal from this true value and communicates with other agents repeatedly. According to the DeGroot model, each agent takes a weighted average of their neighbors' opinions at each step to update their own belief.

The statistician George E. P. Box once said, "All models are wrong; however, some of them are useful." Along the same lines, the DeGroot model is a fairly simple model but it can provide us with useful insights about the learning process in social networks. Indeed, the simplicity of this model makes it tractable for theoretical studies. Specifically, we can analyze different network structure to see for which structures these naive agents can successfully aggregate decentralized information. Since the DeGroot model can be considered a Markov chain, provided that a network is strongly connected (so there is a direct path from any agent to any other) and satisfies a weak aperiodicity condition, beliefs will converge to a consensus. When consensus is reached, the belief of each agent is a weighted average of agents' initial beliefs. These weights provide a measure of social influence.

In the case of a converging opinion dynamic, the social network is called wise if the consensus belief is equal to the true state of the world. It can be shown that the necessary and sufficient condition for wisdom is that the influence of the most influential agent vanishes as the network grows. The speed of convergence is irrelevant to the wisdom of the social network.

== Empirical evaluation of models ==
Along with the theoretical framework for modeling social learning phenomenon, there has been a great amount of empirical research to assess the explanatory power of these models. In one such experiment, 665 subjects in 19 villages in Karnataka, India, were studied while communicating information with each other to learn the true state of the world. This study attempted to distinguish between two most prominent models of information aggregation in social networks, namely, Bayesian learning and DeGroot learning. The study showed that agents' aggregate behavior is statistically significantly better described by the DeGroot learning model.
