= Social learning theory =

Theory of learning and behaviour

Social learning theory is a psychological theory of social behavior that explains how people acquire new behaviors, attitudes, and emotional reactions through observing and imitating others. It states that learning is a cognitive process that occurs within a social context and can occur purely through observation or direct instruction, even without physical practice or direct reinforcement. In addition to the observation of behavior, learning also occurs through the observation of rewards and punishments, a process known as vicarious reinforcement. When a particular behavior is consistently rewarded, it will most likely persist; conversely, if a particular behavior is constantly punished, it will most likely desist. The theory expands on traditional behavioral theories, in which behavior is governed solely by reinforcements, by placing emphasis on the important roles of various internal processes in the learning individual. Albert Bandura is widely recognized for developing and studying it.

== History and theoretical background ==
In the 1940s, B. F. Skinner delivered a series of lectures on verbal behavior, putting forward a more empirical approach to the subject than existed in psychology at the time. In them, he proposed the use of stimulus-response theories to describe language use and development, and that all verbal behavior was underpinned by operant conditioning. He did however mention that some forms of speech derived from words and sounds that had previously been heard (echoic response), and that reinforcement from parents allowed these 'echoic responses' to be pared down to that of understandable speech. While he denied that there was any "instinct or faculty of imitation", Skinner's behaviorist theories formed a basis for redevelopment into Social Learning Theory.

At around the same time, Clark Leonard Hull, an American psychologist, was a strong proponent of behaviorist stimulus-response theories, and headed a group at Yale University's Institute of Human Relations. Under him, Neal Miller and John Dollard aimed to come up with a reinterpretation of psychoanalytic theory in terms of stimulus-response. This led to their book, Social Learning and Imitation, published in 1941, which posited that personality consisted of learned habits. They used Hull's drive theory, where a drive is a need that stimulates a behavioral response, crucially conceiving a drive for imitation, which was positively reinforced by social interaction and widespread as a result. This was the first use of the term 'social learning', but Miller and Dollard did not consider their ideas to be separate from Hullian learning theory, only a possible refinement. Nor did they follow up on their original ideas with a sustained research program.

Julian B. Rotter, a professor at Ohio State University, published his book, Social Learning and Clinical Psychology in 1954. This was the first extended statement of a comprehensive social learning theory. Rotter moved away from the strictly behaviorist learning of the past, and considered instead the holistic interaction between the individual and the environment. Essentially he was attempting an integration of behaviorism (which generated precise predictions but was limited in its ability to explain complex human interactions) and gestalt psychology (which did a better job of capturing complexity but was much less powerful at predicting actual behavioral choices). In his theory, the social environment and individual personality created probabilities of behavior, and the reinforcement of these behaviors led to learning. He emphasized the subjective nature of the responses and effectiveness of reinforcement types. While his theory used vocabulary common to that of behaviorism, the focus on internal functioning and traits differentiated his theories, and can be seen as a precursor to more cognitive approaches to learning.

Rotter's theory is also known as expectancy-value theory due to its central explanatory constructs. Expectancy is defined as the individual's subjectively held probability that a given action will lead to a given outcome. It can range from zero to one, with one representing 100% confidence in the outcome. For example, a person may entertain a given level of belief that they can make a foul shot in basketball or that an additional hour of study will improve their grade on an examination. Reinforcement value is defined as the individual's subjective preference for a given outcome, assuming that all possible outcomes were equally available. In other words, the two variables are independent of each other. These two variables interact to generate behavior potential, or the likelihood that a given action will be performed. The nature of the interaction is not specified, though Rotter suggests that it is likely to be multiplicative. The basic predictive equation is:
$$\mathrm{BP} = f(\mathrm{E \& RV})$$
Where:

- BP = Behavior Potential
- E = Expectancy
- RV = Reinforcement Value

Although the equation is essentially conceptual, it is possible to enter numerical values if one is conducting an experiment. Rotter's 1954 book contains the results of many such experiments demonstrating this and other principles.

Importantly, both expectancies and reinforcement values generalize. After many experiences ('learning trials', in behaviorist language) a person will develop a generalized expectancy for success in a domain. For example, a person who has played several sports develops a generalized expectancy concerning how they will do in an athletic setting. This is also termed freedom of movement. Generalized expectancies become increasingly stable as we accumulate experience, eventually taking on a trait-like consistency. Similarly, we generalize across related reinforcers, developing what Rotter termed need values. These needs (which resemble those described by Henry Murray) are another major determinant of behavior. Generalized expectancies and needs are the major personality variables in Rotter's theory. The influence of a generalized expectancy will be greatest when encountering novel, unfamiliar situations. As experience is gained, specific expectancies are developed regarding that situation. For example, a person's generalized expectancy for success in sports will have less influence on their actions in a sport with which they have long experience.

Another conceptual equation in Rotter's theory proposes that the value of a given reinforcer is a function of the expectancy that it will lead to another reinforcing outcome and the value set upon that outcome. This is important because many social reinforcers are what behaviorists term secondary reinforcers – they have no intrinsic value, but have become linked with other, primary, reinforcers. For example, the value set on obtaining a high grade on an examination is dependent on how strongly that grade is linked (in the subjective belief system of the student) with other outcomes – which might include parental praise, graduation with honors, offers of more prestigious jobs upon graduation, etc. – and the extent to which those other outcomes are themselves valued.

Rotter's social learning theory also generated many suggestions for clinical practice. Psychotherapy was largely conceptualized as expectancy modification and, to some extent, as values modification. This may be seen as an early form of cognitive-behavioral therapy.

In 1959, Noam Chomsky published his criticism of Skinner's book Verbal Behavior, an extension of Skinner's initial lectures. In his review, Chomsky stated that pure stimulus-response theories of behavior could not account for the process of language acquisition, an argument that contributed significantly to psychology's cognitive revolution. He theorized that "human beings are somehow specially designed to" understand and acquire language, ascribing a definite but unknown cognitive mechanism to it.

Within this context, Albert Bandura studied learning processes that occurred in interpersonal contexts and were not, in his view, adequately explained either by theories of operant conditioning or by existing models of social learning. Bandura began to conduct studies of the rapid acquisition of novel behaviors via social observation, the most famous of which were the Bobo doll experiments (1961–63).

In their 1963 book Social Learning and Personality Development, Bandura and Richard Walters argued that "the weaknesses of learning approaches that discount the influence of social variables are nowhere more clearly revealed than in their treatment of the acquisition of novel responses." Skinner's explanation of the acquisition of new responses relied on the process of successive approximation, which required multiple trials, reinforcement for components of behavior, and gradual change. Rotter's theory proposed that the likelihood of a behavior occurring was a function of the subjective expectancy and value of the reinforcement. According to Bandura, this model did not account for a response that had not yet been learned – though this contention does not address the likelihood that generalization from related situations would produce behaviors in new ones.

Bandura went on to write the book Social Learning Theory in 1977.

=== Bandura's Social Learning Theories (1977) ===
Social Learning Theory integrated behavioral and cognitive theories of learning in order to provide a comprehensive model that could account for the wide range of learning experiences that occur in the real world. As initially outlined by Bandura and Walters in 1963, the theory was entirely behavioral in nature; the crucial element that made it innovative and increasingly influential was its emphasis upon the role of imitation. Over the years, however, Bandura shifted to a more cognitive perspective, and this led to a major revision of the theory in 1977. At this time, the key tenets of Social Learning Theory were stated as follows:

1. Learning is not purely behavioral; rather, it is a cognitive process that takes place in a social context.
2. Learning can occur by observing a behavior and by observing the consequences of the behavior (vicarious reinforcement).
3. Learning involves observation, extraction of information from those observations, and making decisions about the performance of the behavior (observational learning or modeling). Thus, learning can occur without an observable change in behavior.
4. Reinforcement plays a role in learning but is not entirely responsible for learning.
5. The learner is not a passive recipient of information. Cognition, environment, and behavior all mutually influence each other (reciprocal determinism).

==== Observation and direct experience ====
Typical stimulus-response theories rely entirely upon direct experience (of the stimulus) to inform behavior. Bandura opens up the scope of learning mechanisms by introducing observation as a possibility. He adds to this the ability of modeling – a means by which humans "represent actual outcomes symbolically". These models, cognitively mediated, allow future consequences to have as much of an impact as actual consequences would in a typical stimulus-response theory. An important factor in Social Learning Theory is the concept of reciprocal determinism. This notion states that just as an individual's behavior is influenced by the environment, the environment is also influenced by the individual's behavior. In other words, a person's behavior, environment, and personal qualities all reciprocally influence each other. For example, a child who plays violent video games will likely influence their peers to play as well, which then encourages the child to play more often.

==== Modeling and underlying cognitive processes ====
Social Learning Theory draws heavily on the concept of modeling as described above. Bandura outlined three types of modeling stimuli:

1. Live models, where a person is demonstrating the desired behavior
2. Verbal instruction, in which an individual describes the desired behavior in detail and instructs the participant in how to engage in the behavior
3. Symbolic, in which modeling occurs by means of the media, including movies, television, Internet, literature, and radio. Stimuli can be either real or fictional characters.

Exactly what information is gleaned from observation is influenced by the type of model, as well as a series of cognitive and behavioral processes, including:

- Attention – in order to learn, observers must attend to the modeled behavior. Experimental studies have found that awareness of what is being learned and the mechanisms of reinforcement greatly boosts learning outcomes. Attention is impacted by characteristics of the observer (e.g., perceptual abilities, cognitive abilities, arousal, past performance) and characteristics of the behavior or event (e.g., relevance, novelty, affective valence, and functional value). In this way, social factors contribute to attention – the prestige of different models affects the relevance and functional value of observation and therefore modulates attention.
- Retention – In order to reproduce an observed behavior, observers must be able to remember features of the behavior. Again, this process is influenced by observer characteristics (cognitive capabilities, cognitive rehearsal) and event characteristics (complexity). The cognitive processes underlying retention are described by Bandura as visual and verbal, where verbal descriptions of models are used in more complex scenarios.
- Reproduction – By reproduction, Bandura refers not to the propagation of the model but the implementation of it. This requires a degree of cognitive skill, and may in some cases require sensorimotor capabilities. Reproduction can be difficult because in the case of behaviors that are reinforced through self-observation (he cites improvement in sports), it can be difficult to observe behavior well. This can require the input of others to provide self-correcting feedback. Newer studies on feedback support this idea by suggesting effective feedback, which would help with observation and correction improves the performance on participants on tasks.
- Motivation – The decision to reproduce (or refrain from reproducing) an observed behavior is dependent on the motivations and expectations of the observer, including anticipated consequences and internal standards. Bandura's description of motivation is also fundamentally based on environmental and thus social factors, since motivational factors are driven by the functional value of different behaviors in a given environment.

==== Evolution and cultural intelligence ====
Social Learning Theory has more recently applied alongside and been used to justify the theory of cultural intelligence. The cultural intelligence hypothesis argues that humans possess a set of specific behaviors and skills that allow them to exchange information culturally. This hinges on a model of human learning where social learning is key, and that humans have selected for traits that maximize opportunities for social learning. The theory builds on extant social theory by suggesting that social learning abilities, like Bandura's cognitive processes required for modeling, correlate with other forms of intelligence and learning. Experimental evidence has shown that humans overimitate behavior compared to chimpanzees, lending credence to the idea that we have selected for methods of social learning. Some academics have suggested that our ability to learn socially and culturally have led to our success as a species.

== In neuroscience ==
Recent research in neuroscience has implicated mirror neurons as a neurophysiology basis for social learning, observational learning, motor cognition and social cognition. Mirror neurons have been heavily linked to social learning in humans. Mirror neurons were first discovered in primates in studies which involved teaching the monkey motor activity tasks. One such study focused on teaching primates to crack nuts with a hammer. When the primate witnessed another individual cracking nuts with a hammer, the mirror neuron systems became activated as the primate learned to use the hammer to crack nuts. However, when the primate was not presented with a social learning opportunity, the mirror neuron systems did not activate and learning did not occur. Similar studies with humans also show similar evidence to the human mirror neuron system activating when observing another person perform a physical task. The activation of the mirror neuron system is thought to be critical for the understanding of goal directed behaviors and understanding their intention. Although still controversial, this provides a direct neurological link to understanding social cognition.

== In social work ==
In social work, some theories can be taken from many disciplines, such as criminology and education. Even though social learning theory comes from psychology, this theory can also be applied to the study of social work. Social learning theory is important in social work because of the observation of others. For example, if a child watches their sibling do their daily routine they are more likely going to want to copy the routine step by step. Feedback and reinforcement can help individuals learn and adopt new behaviors. Social workers can use feedback and reinforcements to help their clients make positive changes. For example, a social worker might provide feedback and reinforcement for a client who has made progress toward a goal, such as maintaining sobriety. Social learning provides a useful framework for social workers to help their clients make positive changes by leveraging the power of social influence and modeling.

== Depression ==
Social learning theory has been explained and shown in many different examples. Depression in social learning can be discussed in a variety of ways. For example, a person with depression may withdraw from social situations and avoid interacting with others. They may feel like they don't have anything to contribute to conversations or others won't understand them. Depression can make it difficult for people to find the motivation to engage in social activities. They may also feel like it takes too much energy to interact with others, and they would rather stay home alone. Social learning theory provides a framework for understanding the role of social factors in depression and for developing interventions that promote positive behaviors and attitudes.

=== In health promotion ===
Social learning theory emphasizes the importance of observing and modeling the behaviors, attitudes and beliefs of others in promoting health behaviors. Promoting positive and healthy habits is a big part of an educator's and even a social worker's job. Teachers are expected to teach their students how to behave in class. For example, if a teacher desires students to be quiet while they are talking, they have to teach them that when the teacher is talking they should be quiet. The teachers are also expected to teach them how to role play and tell stories and also do classroom activities. Another example is peer led health programs they can effectively promote health behaviors among adolescents and young adults by using social learning behaviors and attitudes and provide social support for positive changes. Community based interventions can use Social learning theory principles to promote healthy behaviors at the community levels.

== In addiction ==
Addiction is related to the social learning theory as it emphasizes the role of social influences and reinforces the development and maintenance of addictive behaviors. The social learning theory suggests that people learn and adopt behaviors through observation, experience, and reinforcement from social interactions with others. In the case of addiction, individuals may learn and adopt substance use behaviors from peers, family members, or media exposure, and through positive reinforcement such as pleasure or relief from stress. Additionally, the social learning theory highlights the importance of social context in reinforcing addictive behaviors, as social situations and norms may influence the decision to engage in substance use. The social learning theory proposes that addiction is a learned behavior influenced by environmental and social factors.

== Criminology ==
Social learning theory has been used to explain the emergence and maintenance of deviant behavior, especially aggression. Criminologists Ronald Akers and Robert Burgess integrated the principles of social learning theory and operant conditioning with Edwin Sutherland's differential association theory to create a comprehensive theory of criminal behavior. Burgess and Akers emphasized that criminal behavior is learned in both social and nonsocial situations through combinations of direct reinforcement, vicarious reinforcement, explicit instruction, and observation. Both the probability of being exposed to certain behaviors and the nature of the reinforcement are dependent on group norms.

=== Developmental psychology ===
In her book Theories of Developmental Psychology, Patricia H. Miller lists both moral development and gender-role development as important areas of research within social learning theory. Social learning theorists emphasize observable behavior regarding the acquisition of these two skills. For gender-role development, the same-sex parent provides only one of many models from which the individual learns gender-roles. Social learning theory also emphasizes the variable nature of moral development due to the changing social circumstances of each decision: "The particular factors the child thinks are important vary from situation to situation, depending on variables such as which situational factors are operating, which causes are most salient, and what the child processes cognitively. Moral judgments involve a complex process of considering and weighing various criteria in a given social situation."

For social learning theory, gender development has to do with the interactions of numerous social factors, involving all the interactions the individual encounters. For social learning theory, biological factors are important but take a back seat to the importance of learned, observable behavior. Because of the highly gendered society in which an individual might develop, individuals begin to distinguish people by gender even as infants. Bandura's account of gender allows for more than cognitive factors in predicting gendered behavior: for Bandura, motivational factors and a broad network of social influences determine if, when, and where gender knowledge is expressed.

=== Management ===
Social learning theory proposes that rewards are not the sole force behind creating motivation. Thoughts, beliefs, morals, and feedback all help to motivate us. Three other ways in which we learn are vicarious experience, verbal persuasion, and physiological states. Modeling, or the scenario in which we see someone's behaviors and adopt them as our own, aide the learning process as well as mental states and the cognitive process.

=== Media violence ===
Principles of social learning theory have been applied extensively to the study of media violence. Akers and Burgess hypothesized that observed or experienced positive rewards and lack of punishment for aggressive behaviors reinforces aggression. Many research studies and meta-analyses have discovered significant correlations between viewing violent television and aggression later in life and many have not, as well as playing violent video games and aggressive behaviors. The role of observational learning has also been cited as an important factor in the rise of rating systems for TV, movies, and video games.

=== Creating social change with media ===
Entertainment-education in the form of a telenovela or soap opera can help viewers learn socially desired behaviors in a positive way from models portrayed in these programs. The telenovela format allows the creators to incorporate elements that can bring a desired response. These elements may include music, actors, melodrama, props or costumes. Entertainment education is symbolic modeling and has a formula with three sets of characters with the cultural value that is to be examined is determined ahead of time:

1. Characters that support a value (positive role models)
2. Characters who reject the value (negative role models)
3. Characters who have doubts about the value (undecided)

Within this formula there are at least three doubters that represent the demographic group within the target population. One of these doubters will accept the value less than halfway through, the second will accept the value two-thirds of the way through and the third doubter does not accept the value and is seriously punished. This doubter is usually killed. Positive social behaviors are reinforced with rewards and negative social behaviors are reinforced with punishment. At the end of the episode a short epilogue done by a recognizable figure summarizes the educational content and within the program viewers are given resources in their community.

==== Applications for social change ====
Through observational learning a model can bring forth new ways of thinking and behaving. With a modeled emotional experience, the observer shows an affinity toward people, places and objects. They dislike what the models do not like and like what the models care about. Television helps contribute to how viewers see their social reality. "Media representations gain influence because people's social constructions of reality depend heavily on what they see, hear and read rather than what they experience directly". Any effort to change beliefs must be directed toward the sociocultural norms and practices at the social system level. Before a drama is developed, extensive research is done through focus groups that represent the different sectors within a culture. Participants are asked what problems in society concern them most and what obstacles they face, giving creators of the drama culturally relevant information to incorporate into the show.

The pioneer of entertainment-education is Miguel Sabido a creative writer/producer/director in the 1970s at the Mexican national television system, Televisa. Sabido spent eight years working on a method that would create social change and is known as the Sabido Method. He credits Albert Bandura's social learning theory, the drama theory of Eric Bentley, Carl Jung's theory of archetypes, MacLean's triune brain theory and Sabido's own soap opera theory for influencing his method. Sabido's method has been used worldwide to address social issues such as national literacy, population growth and health concerns such as HIV.

=== Psychotherapy ===
Another important application of social learning theory has been in the treatment and conceptualization of anxiety disorders. The classical conditioning approach to anxiety disorders, which spurred the development of behavioral therapy and is considered by some to be the first modern theory of anxiety, began to lose steam in the late 1970s as researchers began to question its underlying assumptions. For example, the classical conditioning approach holds that pathological fear and anxiety are developed through direct learning; however, many people with anxiety disorders cannot recall a traumatic conditioning event, in which the feared stimulus was experienced in close temporal and spatial contiguity with an intrinsically aversive stimulus. Social learning theory helped salvage learning approaches to anxiety disorders by providing additional mechanisms beyond classical conditioning that could account for the acquisition of fear. For example, social learning theory suggests that a child could acquire a fear of snakes by observing a family member express fear in response to snakes. Alternatively, the child could learn the associations between snakes and unpleasant bites through direct experience, without developing excessive fear, but could later learn from others that snakes can have deadly venom, leading to a re-evaluation of the dangerousness of snake bites, and accordingly, a more exaggerated fear response to snakes.

=== School psychology ===
Many classroom and teaching strategies draw on principles of social learning to enhance students' knowledge acquisition and retention. For example, using the technique of guided participation, a teacher says a phrase and asks the class to repeat the phrase. Thus, students both imitate and reproduce the teacher's action, aiding retention. An extension of guided participation is reciprocal learning, in which both student and teacher share responsibility in leading discussions. Additionally, teachers can shape the classroom behavior of students by modelling appropriate behavior and visibly rewarding students for good behavior. By emphasizing the teacher's role as model and encouraging the students to adopt the position of observer, the teacher can make knowledge and practices explicit to students, enhancing their learning outcomes.

=== Algorithm for computer optimization ===
In modern field of computational intelligence, the social learning theory is adopted to develop a new computer optimization algorithm, the social learning algorithm. Emulating the observational learning and reinforcement behaviors, a virtual society deployed in the algorithm seeks the strongest behavioral patterns with the best outcome. This corresponds to searching for the best solution in solving optimization problems. Compared with other bio-inspired global optimization algorithms that mimic natural evolution or animal behaviors, the social learning algorithm has its prominent advantages. First, since the self-improvement through learning is more direct and rapid than the evolution process, the social learning algorithm can improve the efficiency of the algorithms mimicking natural evolution. Second, compared with the interaction and learning behaviors in animal groups, the social learning process of human beings exhibits a higher level of intelligence. By emulating human learning behaviors, it is possible to arrive at more effective optimizers than existing swarm intelligence algorithms. Experimental results have demonstrated the effectiveness and efficiency of the social learning algorithm, which has in turn also verified through computer simulations the outcomes of the social learning behavior in human society.

Another example is the social cognitive optimization, which is a population-based metaheuristic optimization algorithm. This algorithm is based on the social cognitive theory, simulating the process of individual learning of a set of agents with their own memory and their social learning with the knowledge in the social sharing library. It has been used for solving continuous optimization, integer programming, and combinatorial optimization problems.

There also several mathematical models of social learning which try to model this phenomenon using probabilistic tools.

== See also ==
- Mimetic theory
- Theories of media exposure
