= Robert A. Baron =

American psychologist

Robert Alan Baron (born 1943) is Professor of Management and the Spears Chair of Entrepreneurship at Oklahoma State University's Spears School of Business. He received his Ph.D. and master's degrees from the University of Iowa, and his undergraduate degree, Magna Cum Laude from the Brooklyn College in 1964. He is co-author of the textbook Social Psychology (13th edition), published by Allyn & Bacon, as well as numerous other books (e.g., Behavior in Organizations, 9th edition), and journal articles. Dr. Baron has held faculty appointments at Rensselaer Polytechnic Institute, Purdue, the University of Minnesota, Texas, South Carolina, Washington, Princeton University, and Oxford University.

== Bibliography ==
- Social Psychology: Understanding Human Interaction (1974)
- Human Aggression with Deborah R. Richardson (1994)
- Psychology (2003)
- Entrepreneurship: An Evidence-based Guide (2012)
