= Albert Bandura =

Canadian-American psychologist (1925–2021)

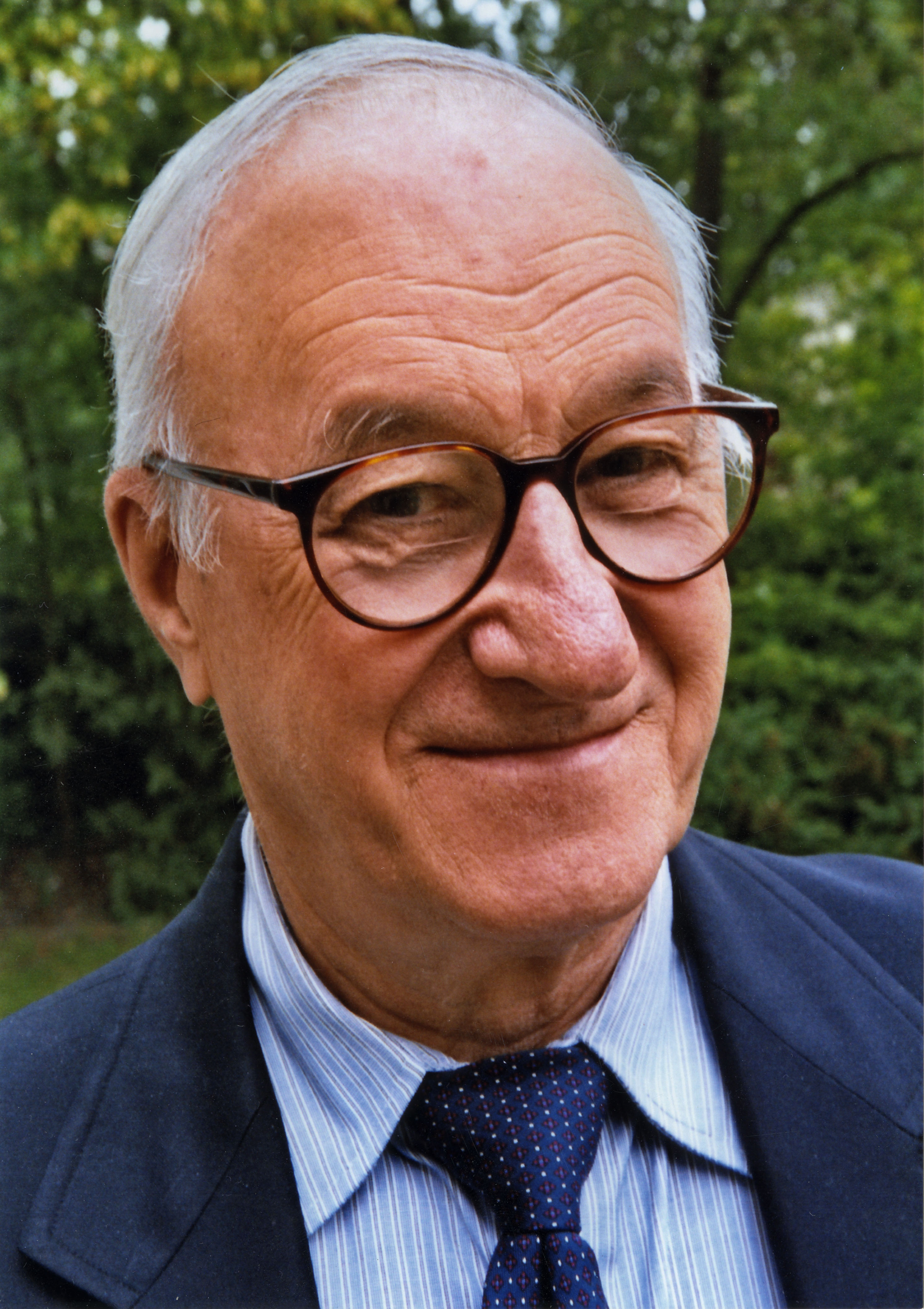
- Bandura in 2005
- Born: December 4, 1925; Mundare, Alberta, Canada
- Died: July 26, 2021 (aged 95); Stanford, California, U.S.
- Education: University of British Columbia (BA); University of Iowa (MA, PhD)
- Known for: Social cognitive theory Self-efficacy; Social learning theory Bobo doll experiment Human agency Reciprocal determinism
- Awards: E. L. Thorndike Award (1999)
- Scientific career
- Fields: Psychology, developmental psychology, social psychology
- Workplaces: Stanford University
- Doctoral advisor: Arthur L. Benton

Albert Bandura (December 4, 1925 – July 26, 2021) was a Canadian-American psychologist and professor of social science in psychology at Stanford University, who contributed to the fields of education and to the fields of psychology (e.g., social cognitive theory, therapy, and personality psychology), and influenced the transition between behaviorism and cognitive psychology. Bandura also is known as the originator of social learning theory, social cognitive theory, and the theoretical construct of self-efficacy. He was responsible for the theoretically influential Bobo doll experiment (1961), which demonstrated the conceptual validity of observational learning, wherein children would observe an adult act either aggressively or neutrally toward a doll, and, having learned through observation, were more likely to also beat the doll if they had witnessed the aggressive behavior.

A 2002 survey ranked Bandura as the fourth most frequently cited psychologist of all time, behind B. F. Skinner, Sigmund Freud, and Jean Piaget. In April 2025, Bandura became the first psychologist with more than a million Google Scholar citations. During his lifetime, Bandura was widely described as the greatest living psychologist, and as one of the most influential psychologists of all time.

== Early life ==
Bandura was born in Mundare, Alberta, an open town of roughly 400 inhabitants, as the youngest of six children. The limitations of education in his remote town caused Bandura to become independent and self-motivated in terms of learning, and the primarily-developed traits proved helpful later in his career. Bandura was of Polish and Ukrainian descent; his father was from Kraków, Poland, while his mother was from Ukraine.

Bandura's parents were a key influence in encouraging him to seek ventures out of the small hamlet they resided in. The summer after finishing high school, Bandura worked in the Yukon to protect the Alaska Highway against sinking. Bandura later credited his work in the northern tundra as the origin of his interest in human psychopathology. His experience in the Yukon, where he was exposed to a subculture of drinking and gambling, helped broaden his perspective and scope of views on life.

Bandura arrived in the United States in 1949 and was naturalized in 1956. He married Virginia Varns (1921–2011) in 1952, and they raised two daughters, Carol and Mary.

== Education and academic career ==
Bandura took psychology courses in college and became passionate about the subject. He graduated after three years in 1949 with a B.A. from the University of British Columbia, winning the Bolocan Award in psychology, and then moved to the then-epicenter of psychology, the University of Iowa, from where he obtained his M.A. in 1951 and Ph.D. in Clinical Psychology in 1952. Arthur Benton was his academic adviser at Iowa, giving Bandura a direct academic descent from William James, while Clark Hull and Kenneth Spence were influential collaborators.

During his Iowa years, Bandura came to support an approach to psychology research that sought to investigate psychological phenomena through repeatable, experimental testing. His inclusion of such mental phenomena as imagery and representation, and his concept of reciprocal determinism, which postulated a relationship of mutual influence between an agent and its environment, marked a radical departure from the dominant behaviorism of the time. Bandura's expanded array of conceptual tools allowed for more potent modeling of such phenomena as observational learning and self-regulation, and provided psychologists with a practical way in which to theorize about mental processes, in opposition to the mentalistic constructs of psychoanalysis and personality psychology.

=== Post-doctoral work ===
Upon graduation, he completed his postdoctoral internship at the Wichita Guidance Center. The following year, 1953, he accepted a teaching position at Stanford University, which he held until he became professor emeritus in 2010. In 1974, he was elected president of the American Psychological Association (APA), the world's largest association of psychologists. Bandura would later state the only reason he agreed to be in the running for the APA election was because he wanted his 15 minutes of fame without any intentions of being elected. He also worked as a sports coach.

== Research ==
Bandura was initially influenced by Robert Sears' work on familial antecedents of social behavior and identificatory learning and gave up his research of the psychoanalytic theory. He directed his initial research to the role of social modeling in human motivation, thought, and action. In collaboration with Richard Walters, his first doctoral student, he engaged in studies of social learning and aggression. Their joint efforts illustrated the critical role of modeling in human behavior and led to a program of research into the determinants and mechanisms of observational learning.

=== Social learning theory ===
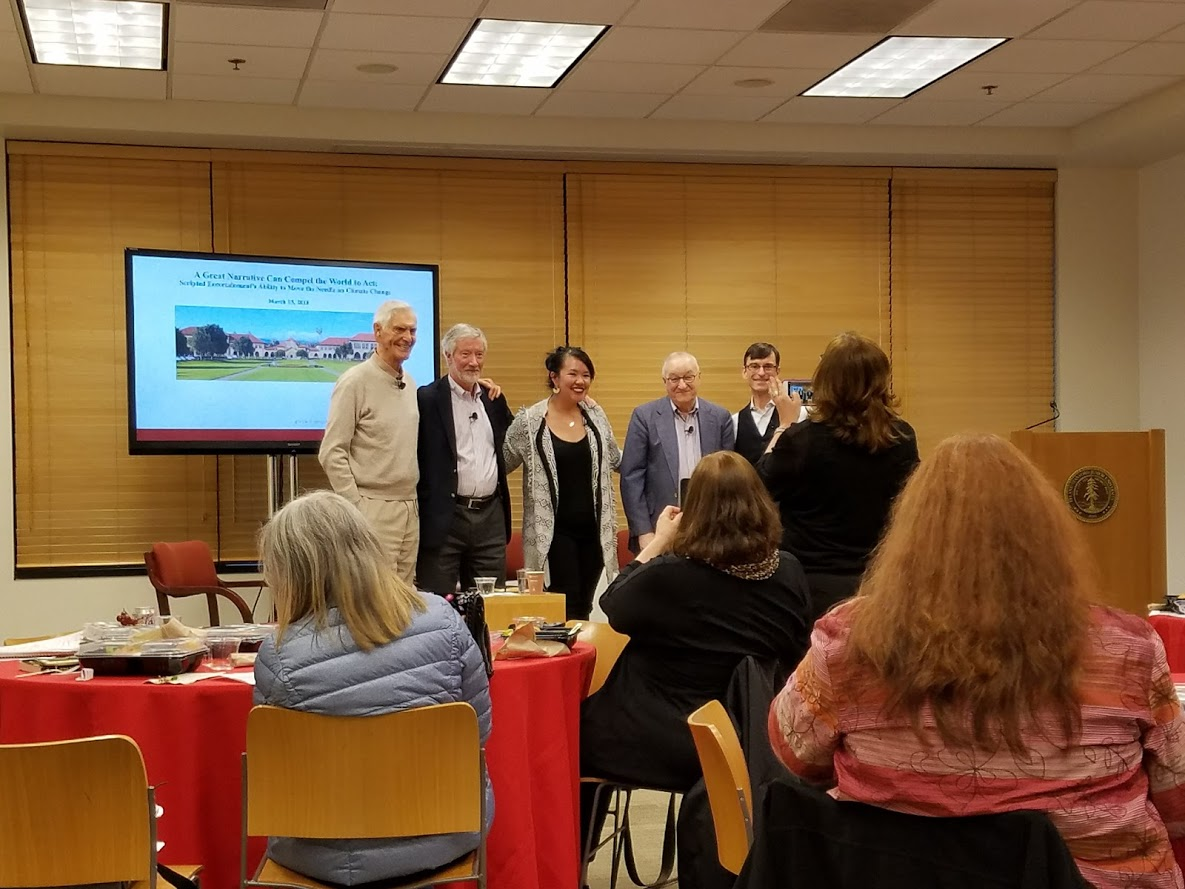
Albert Bandura speaking on social learning theory and Entertainment-Education at Stanford University in March 2015

The initial phase of Bandura's research analyzed the foundations of human learning and the willingness of children and adults to imitate behavior that they observed in other people, particularly the emotion of aggression. The research pointed to modeling as an important means for learning new behaviors and for achieving behavioral change in an institutional setting.

Social learning theory posits three regulatory systems that control human behavior:

1. The antecedent inducements greatly influence the time and response of behavior. The stimulus that occurs before the behavioral response must be appropriate in relation to the social context and the performers of the behavior.
2. Response and feedback influences have an important function. Following a response to a stimulus, the reinforcements, either by experience or by observation, will determine future occurrences of the behavior.
3. Cognitive functions are important in social learning. For example, for aggressive behavior to occur, some people are readily angered by the sight or the thought of persons with whom they had hostile encounters, and that aggression-inducing memory is learned.

Social learning theory became one of the theoretical frameworks for Entertainment-Education, a method of creating socially beneficial entertainment pioneered by Miguel Sabido. Bandura and Sabido went on to forge a close relationship and further refine the theory and practice.

His research with Walters led to Bandura's first book, Adolescent Aggression (1959), followed by Social Learning and Personality Development (1963), and Aggression: A Social Learning Analysis (1973). During a period dominated by behaviorism in the mold of B.F. Skinner, Bandura believed the sole behavioral modifiers of reward and punishment used in classical and operant conditioning were inadequate as a framework, and that many human behaviors were learned from other humans.

Bandura began to analyze approaches for treating unduly aggressive children by identifying sources of violence in their lives. Initial research in the area had begun in the 1940s under Neal Miller and John Dollard. Bandura's continued work in this area eventually culminated in the Bobo doll experiment, which led to his 1977 treatise, Social Learning Theory. Many of his innovations came from his focus on empirical investigation and reproducible investigation, in contrast to Sigmund Freud's popular theories of psychoanalysis. In 1974, Stanford University awarded him an endowed chair and he became David Starr Jordan Professor of Social Science in Psychology.

In 1961, Bandura conducted a controversial experiment known as the Bobo doll experiment, which was designed to show that similar behaviors were learned by individuals shaping their own behavior after the actions of models. The experiment emphasized how young individuals are influenced by the acts of adults. When the adults were praised for their aggressive behavior, the children were more likely to keep on hitting the doll. However, when the adults were punished, they consequently stopped hitting the doll as well. Bandura's results from the experiment were widely credited with helping shift the focus in academic psychology from pure behaviorism to cognitive psychology.

=== Social cognitive theory ===
By the mid-1980s, Bandura's research had taken a more holistic bent, and his analysis tended toward giving a more comprehensive overview of human cognition in the context of social learning. The theory he expanded from social learning theory soon became known as social cognitive theory.

The foundation of Bandura's social learning theory is the idea that people may learn by seeing and copying the observable behaviors of others. As an alternative to the earlier work of colleague psychologist B.F. Skinner, who was well known for advocating the behaviorist theory, psychologists Bandura and Sears presented the social learning hypothesis.

==== Social foundations of thought and action ====
In 1986, Bandura published Social Foundations of Thought and Action: A Social Cognitive Theory, in which he re-conceptualized individuals as self-organizing, proactive, self-reflecting, and self-regulating, in opposition to the orthodox conception of humans as governed by external forces. He advanced concepts of triadic reciprocal causation, which determined the connections between human behavior, environmental factors, and personal factors such as cognitive, affective, and biological events, and of reciprocal determinism, governing the causal relations between such factors. Bandura's emphasis on the capacity of agents to self-organize and self-regulate would eventually give rise to his later work on self-efficacy.

=== Self-efficacy ===
While investigating the processes by which modeling alleviates phobic disorders in snake-phobics, he found that self-efficacy beliefs (which the phobic individuals had in their own capabilities to alleviate their phobia) mediated changes in behavior and in fear-arousal. He launched a major program of research examining the influential role of self-referent thought in psychological functioning. Although he continued to explore and write on theoretical problems relating to myriad topics, from the late 1970s, he devoted much attention to exploring the role of self-efficacy beliefs in human functioning.

In 1986, he published Social Foundations of Thought and Action: A Social Cognitive Theory, a book in which he offered a social cognitive theory of human functioning that accords a central role to cognitive, vicarious, self-regulatory, and self-reflective processes in human adaptation and change. This theory has roots in an agentic perspective that views people as self-organizing, proactive, self-reflecting, and self-regulating, not just as reactive organisms shaped by environmental forces or driven by inner impulses. His book, Self-Efficacy: The Exercise of Control was published in 1997.

The application of Bandura's self-efficacy research did not end with phobia-mediation, but extended into healthcare, particularly in the management of addictive behaviors such as smoking and smoking cessation. In these interventions, an individual's lack of confidence in their ability to resist cravings and high-risk triggers was found to be a strong predictor of relapse. Successful, long-term maintenance of cessation and positive alterations in usage were consistently associated with higher self-efficacy, suggesting that emphasizing and enhancing one's confidence could reduce rates of relapse. These findings validate Bandura's theory and demonstrate ways in which targeting self-efficacy has predicted treatment outcomes in addictive behaviors.

== Educational applications ==
Bandura's social cognitive theories have been applied to education as well, mainly focusing on self-efficacy, self-regulation, observational learning, and reciprocal determinism. Bandura's research showed that high perceived self-efficacy led teachers and students to set higher goals, and it increased the likelihood that they would dedicate themselves to those goals. In an educational setting, self-efficacy refers to a student or teacher's confidence to participate in certain actions that will help them achieve distinct goals.

== Death ==
Bandura died at his home in Stanford, on July 26, 2021, from congestive heart failure, at the age of 95.

== Awards ==
Bandura received more than 16 honorary degrees, including those from the University of British Columbia, the University of Ottawa, Alfred University, the University of Rome, the University of Lethbridge, the University of Salamanca in Spain, Indiana University, the University of New Brunswick, Penn State University, Leiden University, Freie Universität Berlin, the Graduate Center of the City University of New York, Universitat Jaume I in Spain, the University of Athens, the University of Alberta, and the University of Catania.

Bandura was elected a Fellow of the American Academy of Arts and Sciences in 1980. He received the Award for Distinguished Scientific Contributions from the American Psychological Association (APA) in 1980 for pioneering the research in the field of self-regulated learning. In 1999, he received the Thorndike Award for Distinguished Contributions of Psychology to Education from the APA. Bandura is listed as a Distinguished Member of the International Honor Society in Psychology.

In 2001, Bandura received the Lifetime Achievement Award from the Association for the Advancement of Behavior Therapy. He was the recipient of the Outstanding Lifetime Contribution to Psychology Award from the APA and the Lifetime Achievement Award from the Western Psychological Association, the James McKeen Cattell Award from the American Psychological Society, and the Gold Medal Award for Distinguished Lifetime Contribution to Psychological Science from the American Psychological Foundation. In 2008, he received the University of Louisville Grawemeyer Award for contributions to psychology.

In 2014, Bandura was made an Officer of the Order of Canada "for his foundational contributions to social psychology, notably for uncovering the influence of observation on human learning and aggression". In 2016, he was awarded the National Medal of Science by president Barack Obama.

== Books ==
The following books each have more than 5,000 citations in Google Scholar:

- Bandura, A. (1997). Self-efficacy: the exercise of control. New York: W.H. Freeman.
- Bandura, A. (1986). Social Foundations of Thought and Action: A Social Cognitive Theory. Englewood Cliffs, N.J.: Prentice-Hall.

Other books

- Bandura, A., & Walters, R.H. (1959). Adolescent Aggression. Ronald Press: New York.
- Bandura, A. (1962). Social Learning through Imitation. University of Nebraska Press: Lincoln, NE.
- Bandura, A. and Walters, R. H.(1963). Social Learning & Personality Development. Holt, Rinehart & Winston, INC: NJ.
- Bandura, A. (1969). Principles of behavior modification. New York: Holt, Rinehart and Winston.
- Bandura, A. (1971). Psychological modeling: conflicting theories. Chicago: Aldine·Atherton.
- Bandura, A. (1973). Aggression: a social learning analysis. Englewood Cliffs, N.J.: Prentice-Hall.
- Bandura, A., & Ribes-Inesta, Emilio. (1976). Analysis of Delinquency and Aggression. Lawrence Erlbaum Associates, INC: NJ.
- Bandura, A. (1977). Social Learning Theory. Englewood Cliffs, NJ: Prentice Hall.
- Bandura, A. (2015). Moral Disengagement: How People Do Harm and Live with Themselves. New York, NY: Worth.
