= Cognitive Psychology (journal) =

Peer-reviewed scientific journal

- Discipline: Cognitive psychology
- Language: English
- Edited by: Caren Rotello

Publication details
- History: 1970-present
- Publisher: Elsevier
- Frequency: 8/year
- Impact factor: 4.537 (2015)

Standard abbreviations
- ISO 4: Cogn. Psychol.

Indexing
- CODEN: CGPSBQ
- ISSN: 0010-0285 (print); 1095-5623 (web)
- LCCN: 74013551
- OCLC no.: 01411264

Links
- Journal homepage; Online archive

Cognitive Psychology is a peer-reviewed scientific journal covering cognitive psychology. It was established in 1970 and is published eight times per year by Elsevier. The editor-in-chief is Caren Rotello (University of Massachusetts Amherst). Gordon Logan (Vanderbilt University) was the editor-in-chief from 1999 through 2021. According to the Journal Citation Reports, the journal has a 2015 impact factor of 4.537.
