= Donald Meichenbaum =

American psychologist and psychotherapist

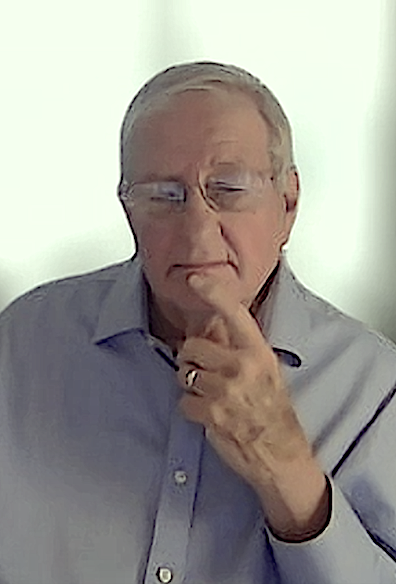
- Meichenbaum in 2025
- Born: Donald H. Meichenbaum; June 10, 1940 (age 86); New York City, New York, U.S.
- Education: City College of New York (BA), University of Illinois (MA, PhD)
- Known for: Cognitive-behavioural therapy; stress inoculation training
- Awards: CPA Award for Distinguished Contribution to Psychology as a Profession (1990); CPA Lifetime Achievement Award (1997); APA Clinical Division Lifetime Achievement Award (2000); Honorary president of the Canadian Psychological Association (2004)
- Scientific career
- Fields: Cognitive-behavioural therapy, Clinical psychology, Developmental psychology

Donald H. Meichenbaum (born June 10, 1940) is an American psychologist and Distinguished Professor Emeritus of Psychology at the University of Waterloo, Ontario. He is also a research director of the Melissa Institute for Violence Prevention and Treatment at the University of Miami. Meichenbaum is known for his research and publications on psychotherapy and his contributions to the development of cognitive behavioral therapy (CBT). In 1982, a survey of 800 members of the American Psychological Association voted Meichenbaum the tenth most influential psychotherapist of the 20th century. At the time of his retirement from the University of Waterloo in 1998, Meichenbaum was the most-cited psychology researcher at a Canadian university.

== Education ==
Meichenbaum was educated at William Howard Taft High School in New York City. He then entered the City College of New York in 1958 with the intention of becoming an engineer, before changing course and graduating in 1962 as a psychology major. He was accepted into the graduate psychology program at University of Illinois Urbana-Champaign. He wrote his dissertation, titled How to Train Schizophrenics to Talk to Themselves, having shown an interest in the topic of self-talk since childhood. He graduated with an MA and PhD in clinical psychology with minors in the subjects of developmental psychology and physiology in 1966, working as a research assistant at a Veterans Health Administration hospital in Danville, Illinois alongside his studies.

== Career ==
Meichenbaum became assistant professor of psychology at the University of Waterloo in 1966. During his tenure at Waterloo he began a research program exploring the role of cognitive and emotional factors in the behavior change process. Several papers and books authored by Meichenbaum during his tenure at Waterloo focused on the use of self-instruction to affect behavior change, which became a core principle of cognitive behavioral therapy. Meichenbaum applied this concept to numerous areas of psychotherapy, including post-traumatic stress disorder, impulsivity in school children, test anxiety in college students, and adults with chronic pain, anger issues, and substance abuse issues. In 1977, Meichenbaum co-founded and served as the associate editor of the journal Cognitive Therapy and Research. Meichenbaum's 1985 clinical handbook Stress Inoculation Training is used by the United States Department of Veterans Affairs as a treatment for PTSD in veterans. He received the Canadian Psychological Association Award for Distinguished Contribution to Psychology as a Profession in 1990, receiving their Lifetime Achievement Award in 1997.

Following his retirement from the University of Waterloo in 1998, Meichenbaum joined the Melissa Institute for Violence Prevention and Treatment of Victims as research director, which is based at the University of Miami's School of Education and Development, where Meichenbaum also worked as distinguished visiting professor. In 2012, Meichenbaum published Roadmap to Resilience: A Guide for Military, Trauma Victims and Their Families, a handbook to help service members reintegrate into civilian life and for clinicians translating evidence-based interventions into clinical guidelines for patients. Meichenbaum has been a frequent critic of the proliferation of non-evidence-based techniques in the field of psychotherapy; his 2018 article How to Spot Hype in the Field of Psychotherapy, co-authored with Scott Lilienfeld, was chosen as the "most valuable contribution to the general field of psychotherapy" of that year by the Journal of Contemporary Psychotherapy which reviewed articles across 81 journals.

== Role in developing cognitive behavioral therapy ==
The cognitive revolution in psychology, which emphasized the importance of mental processes, emerged in the 1960s. However, the integration of cognitive and behavioral approaches in clinical psychology became more prominent in the mid-1970s. Building on Albert Ellis' rational emotive behavior therapy (REBT) and Aaron T. Beck's cognitive therapy, Meichenbaum developed cognitive behavior modification. In 1977, Meichenbaum published Cognitive Behavior Modification: An Integrative Approach, which outlined this therapeutic method.

Cognitive behavior modification is a framework for treatments designed to alter overt behaviors by addressing underlying thought patterns and cognitive processes. While closely related to cognitive behavioral therapy (CBT), these approaches share similar assumptions and methods but emphasize different outcomes. Cognitive behavior modification focuses specifically on behavioral change as a therapeutic goal, whereas CBT primarily targets cognitive change with the expectation that behavioral change will follow.

Meichenbaum was recognized for his contributions to psychotherapy, being named the tenth most influential psychotherapist of the 20th century in a 1982 survey. His book, Cognitive-Behavior Modification, was also voted as one of the most representative works in counseling and psychotherapy at the time. Among his contributions to the field are self-instructional training (SIT) and stress inoculation training, both of which are described as foundational cognitive behavioral therapies in the Handbook of Cognitive-Behavioral Therapies (4th ed.) (Dobson, 2019).

In addition to his clinical contributions, Meichenbaum explored the role of spirituality in trauma recovery. He described spirituality as a means of finding meaning and direction, emphasizing its role in fostering forgiveness, empathy, and personal growth. He acknowledged, however, that spirituality or religion is not a universal solution but can be a valuable component in helping individuals recover from trauma.

== Publications ==
=== Books ===
- Cognitive Behavior Modification: An Integrative Approach (1977)
- Coping with Stress (1983)
- Stress Reduction and Prevention (1983)
- Pain and Behavioral Medicine: A Cognitive-Behavioral Perspective (1983)
- Stress Inoculation Training (1985)
- Facilitating Treatment Adherence. A Practitioner's Guidebook (1987)
- A Clinical Handbook/Practical Therapist Manual for Assessing and Treating Adults with Post-Traumatic Stress Disorder (PTSD) (1994)
- Nurturing Independent Learners: Helping Students Take Charge of Their Learning (1998)
- Treatment of Individuals with Anger-Control Problems and Aggressive Behaviors: a Clinical Handbook (2001)
- Roadmap to Resilience: A Guide for Military, Trauma Victims and Their Families (2012)
- The Evolution of Cognitive Behavior Therapy: A Personal and Professional Journey with Don Meichenbaum (2017)
- Treating Individuals with Addictive Disorders: A Strengths-Based Workbook for Patients and Clinicians (2020)

=== Articles ===
Meichenbaum has published extensively in academic journals and conferences. A comprehensive archive of these publications is maintained at the Melissa Institute website.

- "Training impulsive children to talk to themselves: a means of developing self-control", Journal of Abnormal Psychology (1971)
- "Examination of model characteristics in reducing avoidance behavior", Journal of Personality and Social Psychology (1971)
- "Cognitive modification of test anxious college students", Journal of Consulting and Clinical Psychology (1972)
- "Training schizophrenics to talk to themselves: A means of developing attentional controls", Behavior Therapy (1973)
- "Cognitive behavior modification", Scandinavian Journal of Behavior Therapy (1977)
- "35 Years of Working With Suicidal Patients: Lessons Learned", Canadian Psychology (2005)
- "Ways to improve political decision-making: Negotiating errors to be avoided", Psychological and Political Strategies for Peace (2011)
