= Psychological Inquiry =

- Discipline: Psychology
- Language: English

Publication details
- History: One volume per year, beginning 1990
- Publisher: Taylor & Francis
- Frequency: Quarterly
- Impact factor: 6.312 (2013)

Standard abbreviations
- ISO 4: Psychol. Inq.

Indexing
- ISSN: 1047-840X (print); 1532-7965 (web)

Links
- Journal homepage

The Psychological Inquiry (PI) is a quarterly psychology journal published by Taylor & Francis. It aims to be a forum for the discussion of theory and meta-theory, primarily in social psychology and personality. It aims to publish ideas and theories that are broad, provocative, and debatable, while discouraging purely empirical, applied, or review articles. Each issue typically includes a target article followed by peer commentaries and a response from the target author.

PI is indexed in PsycINFO. Sociological Abstracts, Social Sciences Citation Index, Scopus, and elsewhere.
