= Reciprocal determinism =

Theory in psychology on behavior

Reciprocal determinism is the theory set forth by psychologist Albert Bandura as part of his social cognitive theory of learning. It states that a person's behavior both influences and is influenced by personal factors and the social environment. Bandura accepts the possibility that an individual's behavior may be conditioned through the use of consequences. At the same time he asserts that a person's behavior (and personal factors, such as cognitive skills or attitudes) can impact the environment.

Bandura was able to show this when he created the Bandura's Box experiment. As an example, Bandura's reciprocal determinism could occur when a child is acting out in school. The child doesn't like going to school; therefore, they act out in class. This results in teachers and administrators of the school disliking having the child around. When confronted by the situation, the child admits they hate school and other peers don't like them. This results in the child acting inappropriately, forcing the administrators who dislike having them around to create a more restrictive environment for children of this stature. Each behavioral and environmental factor coincides with the child and so forth resulting in a continuous battle on all three levels.

The basis of reciprocal determinism should transform individual behavior by allowing subjective thought processes transparency when contrasted with cognitive, environmental, and external social stimulus events.

Actions do not go one way or the other, as it is affected by repercussions, meaning one's behavior is complicated and can't be thought of as individual and environmental means. Behavior consist of environmental and individual parts that interlink together to function. Many studies showed reciprocal associations between people and their environments over time.

== Research ==
Research conducted in this field include the study of doctor-patient relationships where one group of patients are termed 'physician-reliant' and the other group 'self-reliant'. The physician-reliant patients tend to be more passive in their decision making and rely on their physicians to make their choices for them. Self-reliant patients take a more active role in deciding which health options would better suit them.

=== Mathematics ===
Another relevant research is regarding the reciprocal determinism of self-efficacy and mathematical performance. It shows that reciprocal determinism may not be the appropriate model in all cultures but does take place in most. Self-efficacy is a conceptualized assessment of the person's competence to perform a specific task. Self-efficacy results from success or failures that arise in attempts to learn a task. Self-efficacy, measure by a personal confidence level before each question, and the mathematical scores were obtained in 41 countries for the study by Kitty and Trevor Williams. The reciprocal determinism of mathematics self-efficacy and achievement was found in 26 of the 30 nations. They suggest that this might be a fundamental psychological process that takes place across national boundaries. According to Albert Bandura, self-efficacy is defined as a person's belief in their capability to accomplish a certain task. Another study looked at the relationship of self-efficacy and job culture with job satisfaction among athletic trainers. The study used Bandura's triadic reciprocal causation model as a template to label job satisfaction as the behavioural factor, self-efficacy as the personal factor, and job culture as the environmental factor.

== Triadic reciprocal causation ==
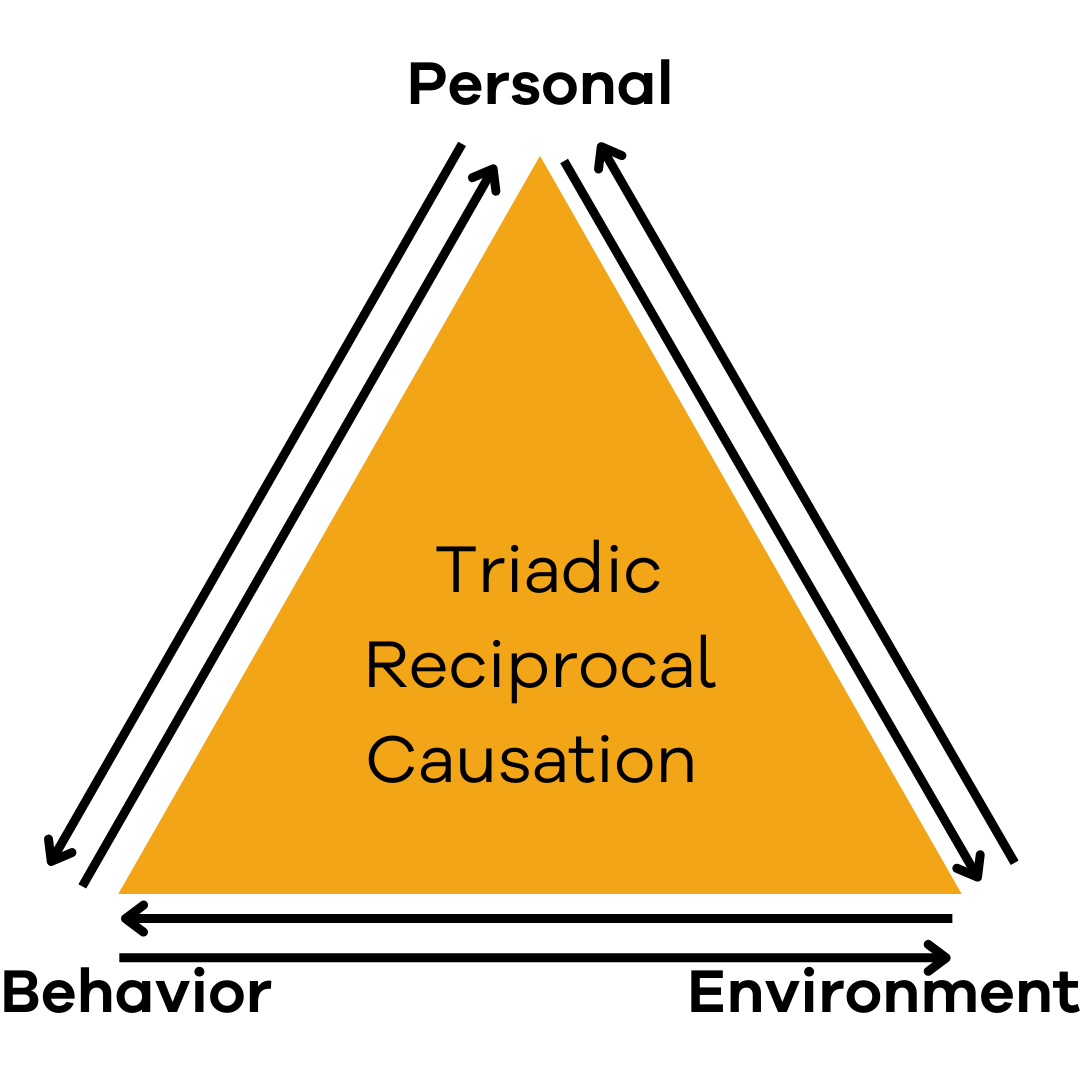
Triadic Causation Model

Triadic reciprocal causation is a term introduced by Albert Bandura to refer to the mutual influence between three sets of factors:

- personal factors (e.g., cognitive, affective and biological events),
- the environment,
- behavior

== Interaction of genes and environment ==
Behavioral genetics is a relatively new field of study attempting to make sense of both genetic and environmental contributions to individual variations in human behavior. Genes can be turned on and off. Multiple genes are factors in forming behavior traits.

=== Aggression in abused boys ===
Researchers believe there is a genetic link to impulsive aggression through the impact of a gene on the production of an enzyme called Monoamine oxidase A (MAOA). The MAOA gene reduces the production of MAOA, leading to increased incidents of impulsive aggression. A 26-year study in New Zealand found strong correlation between experience of childhood abuse and criminal or violent behavior in males with the MAOA gene. In that study, impulsive aggression was found to be nine times more likely to manifest in males with the gene who were abused than in abused males without the gene or males with the gene who had not been abused.

== See also ==
- Social cognitive theory
- Individual differences psychology
- Field theory (psychology)
