= PsycCritiques =

- Producer: American Psychological Association
- Languages: English

Access
- Cost: Subscription

Coverage
- Record depth: Index & full-text
- Format coverage: Reviews of media
- Temporal coverage: 1956–2017
- Update frequency: Weekly

Print edition
- Print title: Contemporary Psychology: APA Review of Books
- Print dates: 1956–2004
- ISSN: 1554-0138

Links
- Website: www.apa.org/pubs/databases/psyccritiques/

PsycCritiques (formerly stylized as PsycCRITIQUES) was a database of reviews of books, videos, and popular films published by the American Psychological Association. It replaced the print journal Contemporary Psychology: APA Review of Books, which was published from 1956 to 2004. The official blog of PsycCritiques allowed free access to the full text of some recent reviews. It was discontinued on December 31, 2017. Archives are available to the public via the Center for the History of Psychology (University of Akron) or via a paid subscription to Portico.

== See also ==
- PsycInfo
