= James McKeen Cattell Fellow Award =

The James McKeen Cattell Fellow Award is an award of the Association for Psychological Science given since 1992. The award is named after James McKeen Cattell and "honors individuals for their lifetime of significant intellectual contributions to the basic science of psychology." As part of APS's 25th Anniversary, the APS Board of Directors recognized a larger class of James McKeen Cattell Fellows in 2013, identifying them as individuals who have had a profound impact on the field of psychological science over the previous quarter century.”

== Awardees ==
1992

- Aaron T. Beck
- Alphonse Chapanis
- Anne Anastasi
- Donald E. Super
- Edward L. Palmer
- Edwin A. Fleishman
- Fred S. Keller
- Gerald R. Patterson
- Gerald S. Lesser
- John Money
- Joseph Wolpe
- Martin T. Orne
- Nathan H. Azrin
- Robert Glaser
- Robert M. Gagne
- Wallace E. Lambert

1993

- Leonard Berkowitz
- Sandra Scarr
- Urie Bronfenbrenner

1994

- Harold W. Stevenson
- Julian C. Stanley Jr.

1995

- Martin E.P. Seligman
- Ward Edwards

1996

- Harry C. Triandis
- Jacquelynne S. Eccles

1997

- Ann Brown
- Elizabeth F. Loftus

1998

- John B. Carroll
- Paul Meehl

1999

- Fred E. Fiedler
- Robert J. Sternberg

2000

- Herbert C. Kelman
- Robert M. Guion

2001

- Lee J. Cronbach
- Robert Rosenthal

2002

- Jeanne Brooks-Gunn
- Sheldon A. Cohen

2004

- Albert Bandura
- Michael E. Lamb

2005

- E. Mavis Hetherington
- Stephen J. Ceci

2006

- Edwin A. Locke
- Timothy B. Baker

2007

- James S. Jackson
- Morton Deutsch

2008

- Frank L. Schmidt
- Howard S. Friedman

2009

- Lauren B. Alloy
- Lyn Yvonne Abramson
- Wilbert J. McKeachie

2010

- Alan E. Kazdin
- Gary P. Latham

2011

- Earl Hunt
- J. Frank Yates

2012

- David H. Barlow
- Geraldine Dawson
- Gail S. Goodman

2013

- Nancy E. Adler
- Chris Argyris
- Mihaly Csikszentmihalyi
- Carol S. Dweck
- Irving I. Gottesman
- J. Richard Hackman
- Diane F. Halpern
- Scott O. Lilienfeld
- Karen A. Matthews
- Susan Nolen-Hoeksema
- Elaine F. Walker
- John R. Weisz

2014

- Dante Cicchetti
- Marsha M. Linehan
- Neal Schmitt

2015

- Ian J. Deary
- Ellen Frank (psychologist)
- Roberta M. Golinkoff
- Kathy Hirsh-Pasek

2016

- Robert A. Bjork
- Elizabeth J. Bjork
- Phoebe C. Ellsworth
- Stephen P. Hinshaw

2017

- Gary L. Wells
- Susan T. Fiske

2018

- Richard A. Bryant
- Janet Shibley Hyde
- Richard E. Mayer
- Cynthia F. Moss

2019

- George A. Bonanno
- Roberta L. Klatzky
- Robert J. MacCoun

2020

- Thomas Joiner
- Richard M. Lerner

2021

- Alison Gopnik
- Megan Gunnar
- Saul Kassin

2022

- Mahzarin Banaji and Anthony Greenwald
- Claude Steele
- Laurence Steinberg

2023

- Gene Brody
- Michelle Craske
- Eduardo Salas

2024

- Steven C. Hayes
- Anthony Jorm
- Gordon Legge

2025

- J. Lawrence Aber
- Eric J. Johnson
- Christina Maslach

== See also ==
- List of psychology awards
