= APA Distinguished Scientific Award for the Applications of Psychology =

The APA Distinguished Scientific Award for the Applications of Psychology is an award of the American Psychological Association

== Recipients ==
Source: APA

=== 20th Century ===
- 1973 Conrad L. Kraft
- 1974 Gerald S. Lesser, Edward L. Palmer
- 1975 Nathan H. Azrin
- 1976 Fred S. Keller
- 1977 Starke R. Hathaway
- 1978 Alphonse Chapanis
- 1979 Joseph Wolpe
- 1980 Edwin A. Fleishman
- 1981 Anne Anastasi
- 1982 Robert M. Gagné
- 1983 Donald E. Super
- 1984 Gerald R. Patterson
- 1985 John Money
- 1986 Martin T. Orne
- 1987 Robert Glaser
- 1988 Leonard Berkowitz
- 1989 Aaron T. Beck
- 1990 Wallace E. Lambert
- 1991 Joseph V. Brady
- 1992 Charles R. Schuster
- 1993 Herschel W. Leibowitz
- 1994 John E. Hunter, Frank L. Schmidt
- 1995 Ann L. Brown
- 1996 Ward Edwards
- 1997 Harold Stevenson
- 1998/1999 Loren J. Chapman, Jean P. Chapman
- 2000 David H. Barlow

=== 21st Century ===
- 2001 David T. Lykken
- 2002 Robert Rosenthal
- 2003 Stephen J. Ceci, Elizabeth F. Loftus
- 2004 Edward Taub
- 2005 Karen A. Matthews
- 2006 John P. Campbell
- 2007 Karl G. Jöreskog, Peter M. Bentler
- 2008 John L. Holland
- 2009 Nancy E. Adler
- 2010 David M. Clark
- 2011 Alan E. Kazdin
- 2012 Kelly D. Brownell
- 2013 J. Richard Hackman
- 2014 G. Terence Wilson
- 2015 Michael E. Lamb
- 2016 James W. Pennebaker
- 2017 Jacquelynne S. Eccles
- 2018 Kenneth A. Dodge
- 2019 James S. Jackson
- 2020 Steven D. Hollon
- 2021 James H. Sidanius
- 2022 Christopher G. Fairburn
- 2023 Michelene T. H. Chi
- 2024 Francis J. Keefe
- 2025 Philip C. Kendall

== See also ==
- List of psychology awards
