= Learning through play =

Concept in education and psychology

Learning through play is a term used in education and psychology to describe how a child can learn to make sense of the world around them. Through play children can develop social and cognitive skills, mature emotionally, and gain the self-confidence required to engage in new experiences and environments.

Key ways that young children learn include playing, being with other people, being active, exploring and new experiences, talking to themselves, communication with others, meeting physical and mental challenges, being shown how to do new things, practicing and repeating skills and having fun.

== Definitions of work and play ==
Play enables children to make sense of their world, as children possess a natural curiosity to explore and play acts as a medium to do so.

Definitions of play

In Einstein Never Used FlashCards five elements of children's play are outlined

- Play must be pleasurable and enjoyable.
- Play must have no extrinsic goals.
- Play is spontaneous and voluntary.
- Play involves active engagement.
- Play involves an element of make-believe.

Additionally, play is characterized by Creativity and Imagination. Creativity is evident in role play, construction activities, and other forms of imaginative play. Imagination allows children to create mental images related to their feelings, thoughts, and ideas, which they then incorporate into their play.

Researchers Beverlie Dietze and Diane Kashin in Playing and Learning seven common characteristics of play include:

- Play is active.
- Play is child-initiated.
- Play is process-oriented.
- Play is intrinsic.
- Play is episodic.
- Play is rule-governed.
- Play is symbolic.

Contrasted with Work

There are important distinctions between play and work in the context of children's activities. Play is generally a self-directed activity chosen by the child and is centered around exploration and enjoyment. In contrast, work typically involves structured tasks with specific goals and outcomes.

According to researchers, Dietze and Kashin, play is characterized by internal control, the ability to adapt or create new realities, and intrinsic motivation. When adults impose specific objectives on an activity and label it as play, it can blur the line between play and work. For example, using flash cards to help a child memorize information may be more closely associated with work due to its structured nature and goal orientation.

Understanding the distinction between play and work can have implications for child development. While structured activities can provide learning opportunities, play fosters creativity, problem-solving, and autonomy. Educators and parents mindful of these differences can create environments that support children's holistic development.

Play offers an opportunity for children to build new knowledge from previous experiences. Researchers have differentiated between work and play in various ways:

1. Primary Activities: a child's action is work if it adds immediate value to the family unit, even if the culture perceives the action as play.
2. Parental Perspective: Parents from different cultures have varying views on what constitutes work or play in children's actions. For instance, a Mayan mother may see her daughter setting up a fruit stand as play, while many Western cultures might view it as work if the child successfully sells the fruit.
3. Child's Perspective: Children may have different perceptions of play and work compared to adults, which can influence how they engage in and interpret various activities.

=== Classical, modern and contemporary perspectives ===
There are three main groups of play theories:

Classical Theories

Classical theorists such as Jean Jacques Rousseau, Fredrich Froebel, and John Dewey had a significant impact on changing societal views of childhood. They emphasized the importance of play in children's learning and development. These theorists promoted children's learning experiences through direct interaction with nature and life.

Classical theories of play also include concepts such as burning off excess energy, recreation and relaxation, replenishing energy after hard work, practicing future roles, and recapitulation theory. Herbert Spencer proposed that play allows humans to expend excess energy not required for survival.

Modern Theories

Modern theories focus on play's role in cognitive development. Jean Piaget emphasized how children construct knowledge through play-based stages of development, which has influenced many early childhood education programs. Fredrich Froebel's idea of play as 'serious work' aligns with modern perspectives on play's educational value.

Modern perspectives also examine play's impact on a child's development. For example, Dietze and Kashin view the learner as an active constructor of meaning.

Contemporary Theories

Contemporary theories emphasize the role of social and cultural contexts in children's learning and development. Rousseau's work on children's rights and the need for protection due to their innocence is an aspect of contemporary perspectives. Dewey's view of the child as an active agent in learning also aligns with contemporary theories that focus on empowering children through play.

Contemporary theories address the relationship between play, diversity, and social justice in daily life and learning. Children learn through their daily living experiences and are influenced by various contexts such as family, community, culture, and broader society. Lev Vygotsky's concept of the Zone of Proximal Development suggests that children need activities that support past learning while encouraging new challenges. Social engagement and collaboration with others can transform children's thinking. Urie Bronfenbrenner highlights the impact of the person-environment relationship on child development (Khuluqo 2016, Bodrova & Leong 2015).

A 2022 review found that guided play helped children develop some early math skills and understand shapes better than direct instruction, although benefits were not found for every learning outcome.

=== Cultural Perspectives ===
Cross-Cultural Perspectives

While play has been studied extensively in Western cultures, including by Susan Isaacs in the first half of the 20th century, experts like Gunilla Dahlberg and Fleer challenge the universality of Western perspectives on play. Fleer's work with Australian Aboriginal children suggests that not all cultures emphasize play in the same way. Different cultures and communities have distinct ways of encouraging play. For instance, some may discourage adult involvement in play or expect children to play in mixed age groups away from adults. Additionally, some cultures may expect children to outgrow play by a certain age.

The Yucatec Maya culture offers a unique approach to play and learning, emphasizing reality-based activities and observation.

Learning through Play

Yucatec Maya children engage in play that is closely tied to real-life activities such as making tortillas, weaving, and cleaning clothing. They often learn through "Intent Community Participation," which involves observation and participation in community activities. Unlike children in many Western cultures, Yucatec Maya children do not engage in extensive pretend play, as it is considered akin to lying because it involves representing something that isn't real". For example, a Mayan mother told an ethnographer that she would "tolerate" her child pretending that the leaves in a bowl were a form of food. Instead, their play mirrors everyday life.

Age Groups and Interaction

Yucatec Maya children play and interact with individuals of all ages, rather than focusing on age-segregated play typical in some Western cultures. This approach helps them model adult behaviors and explore realistic representations of their culture.

Observational Learning

Observation plays a crucial role in Yucatec Maya children's learning process. They actively participate by observing and modeling useful activities within the community. Accordingly," It is inherently integrated into the daily activities of the compound."

=== Importance ===
Play is sufficiently important to the UN that it has recognized it as a specific right for all children. Children need the freedom to explore and play. Play also contributes to brain development. Play enables developmental in the prefrontal cortex of mammals, including humans. Evidence from neuroscience shows that the early years of a child's development (from birth to age six) set the basis for learning, behavior and health throughout life. A child's neural pathways are influenced in their development through the exploration, thinking, problem-solving and language expression which occur during play episodes. According to the Canadian Council on Learning, "Play nourishes every aspect of children's development – it forms the foundation of intellectual, social, physical, and emotional skills necessary for success in school and in life. Play 'paves the way for learning'”.

Learning occurs when children play with blocks, paint a picture or play make-believe. During play children try new things, solve problems, invent, create, test ideas and explore. Children need unstructured, creative playtime; in other words, children need time to learn through their play. The level of emotional arousal enacted during play is ideal for consolidation and integration of neural pathways. Allowing the child to direct the play means allowing the child to find the place most comfortable, allowing the promotion of neuroplasticity. Children engaged in self-directed play can create their own schemas allowing the integration of affect and cognition. Play also promotes neuroplasticity development by allowing children to co-construct wordless narratives of self-awareness and transformation.

According to Pascel, "Play is serious business for the development of young learners. This is such an important understanding. A deliberate and effective play-based approach supports young children's cognitive development. When well designed, such an approach taps into children's individual interests, draws out their emerging capacities, and responds to their sense of inquiry and exploration of the world around them. It generates highly motivated children enjoying an environment where the learning outcomes of a curriculum are more likely to be achieved”.

== In childhood ==
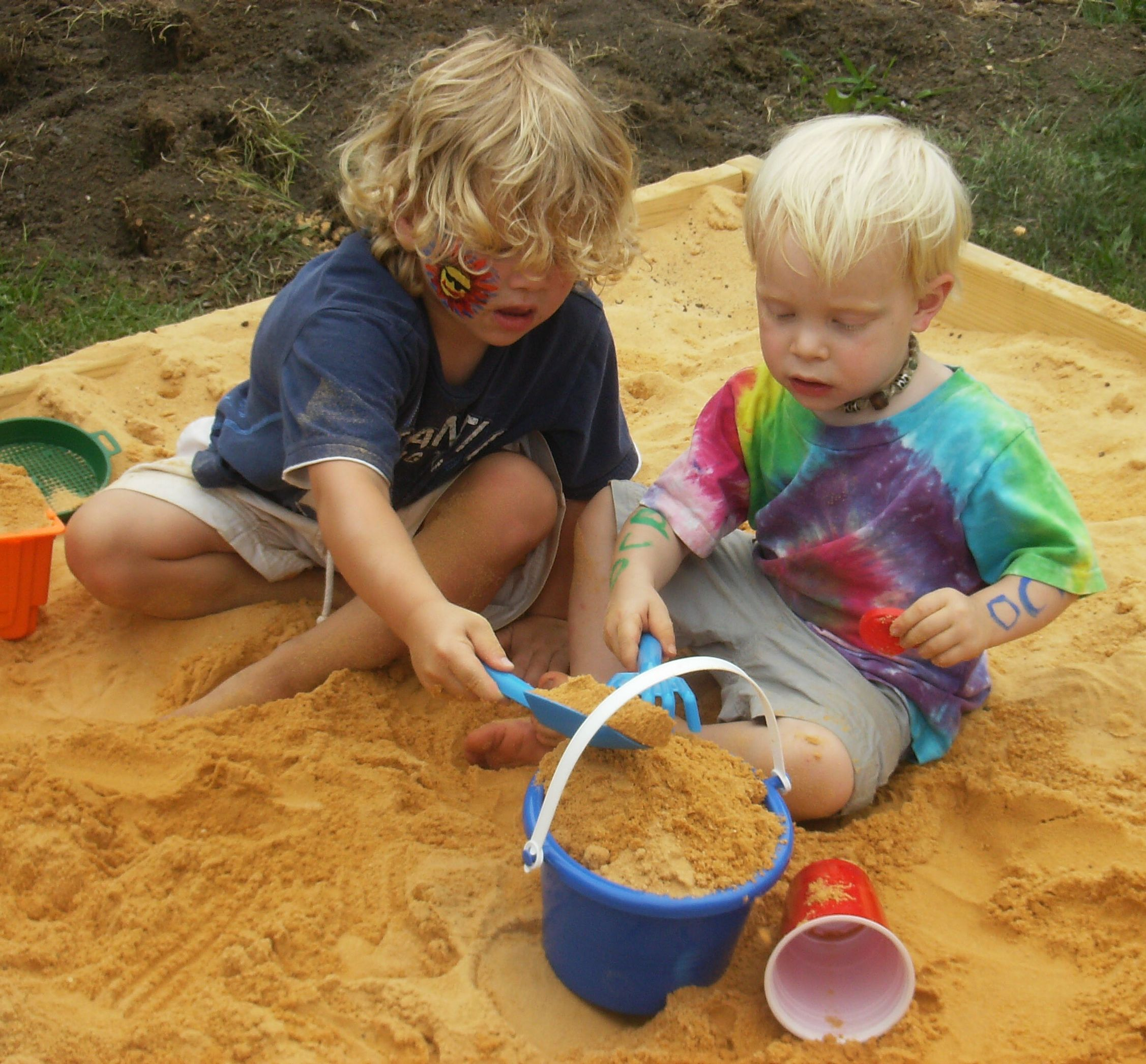
Children in playground sandbox

Play is strongly linked to learning in young children, especially in areas such as problem-solving, language acquisition, literacy, numeracy, and social, physical, and emotional skills. Through learning-based play, children actively explore their environment and the world around them. Play is essential for a child's optimal social, cognitive, physical, and emotional development. Researchers agree that play establishes a foundation for intellectual growth, creativity, and basic academic knowledge.

According to Dorothy Singer, make-believe games allow children to imagine different roles and scenarios. Through sociodramatic play, children learn to manage emotions, understand the world, and navigate social interactions such as sharing and cooperation.

Purposeful, quality play experiences build critical skills for cognitive development and academic achievement. These include verbalization, language comprehension, vocabulary, imagination, questioning, problem-solving, observation, empathy, cooperation, and understanding others' perspectives.

Play also helps children develop social skills, creativity, hand-eye coordination, problem solving, and imagination. These skills are often more effectively learned through play than through flashcards or academic drills. Additionally, Slovak researchers Gmitrova and Gmitrov emphasize the importance of pretend play as a medium for children to progress beyond the educational curriculum.

Social play boosts children's confidence when trying new activities and enhances their ability to work with different symbols creatively. The benefits of play are so extensive that it is considered an evolutionary and developmentally important activity, helping children engage in socially appropriate behaviors that benefit them into adulthood.

=== Beliefs about the play-learning relationship ===
Linda Longley and colleagues found differing beliefs about the relationship between play and learning. While parents often see structured play activities (e.g., educational videos) as more valuable for learning, experts regard unstructured activities (such as pretend play) as more beneficial.

Even though teachers may recognize the value of play-based learning, research across several countries (such as China, India, and Ireland) suggests a gap between their beliefs and classroom practices. For example, in some settings, teachers who value play-based learning still rely more on traditional instruction methods. This may be due to factors such as accountability pressures or a lack of resources.

These challenges demonstrate a notable gap between teachers' beliefs about play-based learning and their classroom practices. This discrepancy can affect students' opportunities for growth and development through play-based activities, which support early literacy, language, mathematics, and socio-emotional skills.(Lynch, 2015)

== Play-based learning ==
Play-based learning is an educational approach that supports children's development and learning. Through play, children can develop content knowledge, social skills, competences, and a positive disposition to learn. This approach is rooted in Lev Vygotsky's model of scaffolding, where teachers focus on specific aspects of play activities and offer encouragement and feedback on children's learning. Play can challenge children's thinking, especially when they engage in real-life and imaginary activities. Sensitive intervention and adult support can be provided during play-based learning when necessary. Play also gives children opportunities to practice self regulation, including managing emotions and behavior.

Children learn best through first-hand experiences in play-based learning. This approach motivates and stimulates children while supporting the development of skills, concepts, language acquisition, communication skills, and concentration. It also offers opportunities for children to develop positive attitudes and consolidate recent learning, skills, and competencies.

The DCSG outlined benefits of play-based learning in early childhood education. Playful children use and apply their knowledge, skills, and understanding in different ways and contexts. Practitioners also engage children in activities that help them learn and develop positive dispositions for learning. Practitioners should not plan children's play directly, as this can interfere with the choice and control central to play. Instead, they should plan for play by creating high-quality learning environments and ensuring uninterrupted periods for children to engage in play

According to researchers Kathy Hirsh-Pasek and Roberta Michnick Golinkoff, adults playing with children can positively impact the quality and variety of play. When adults join in, they guide and extend play without controlling it, which allows children to follow their own interests and engage in cognitive development more effectively. Play is the language and currency of children

Here are several ways educators, parents, and guardians can facilitate children's learning during play.

1. Model Positive Attitudes: Adults can encourage play by providing a balance of indoor and outdoor activities throughout the year. By participating in play, adults guide and shape the experience without dominating it.
2. Create an Engaging Environment: Select a variety of toys, materials, and equipment to suit different skill levels and interests. This approach motivates children's exploration and discovery.
3. Observe and Respond: Ongoing observation of how children interact with toys and materials can provide insights into their interests and abilities, guiding further learning and development.
4. Engage Thoughtfully: Adults should carefully join in play activities without overshadowing children's initiatives, allowing children to take the lead.
5. Extend Play: Listening, repeating, extending, and asking questions at the right moments can help expand and enhance play. Adults can provide the language needed for children to articulate their observations.
6. Encourage Social and Cognitive Skills: By providing social knowledge and opportunities for children to explore physical and logico- mathematical knowledge, adults help children understand the world around them and solve problems.

By using these approaches, adults can create a supportive environment that nurtures children's natural curiosity and cognitive growth during play.

== Criticism of play-based learning ==
Knowledge acquisition

Research over the past forty years has shown a positive correlation between play and children's learning, indicating that play can benefit children's education. However, some findings suggest that play may be more closely associated with procedural knowledge(skills and strategies) rather than declarative knowledge (facts and information). Correlational research alone cannot definitively determine the extent to which play influences learning outcomes. While play can help children develop important procedural knowledge, which can later support the acquisition of declarative knowledge, the relationship between play and declarative learning is not yet fully established.

Pretend Play: Creativity, Intelligence, and Problem-Solving:

Regarding creativity, evidence from meta-analyses on pretend play is mixed, with some studies suggesting a relationship with creativity and others finding little impact. The connection between play and intelligence remains unclear, as research cannot conclusively determine whether play promotes intelligence or if intelligence encourages play. In terms of problem-solving, construction play is correlated with solving puzzles and other similar tasks.

Recent studies indicate that engaging in playful interactions with peers helps children develop essential life skills such as problem-solving abilities and conflict resolution. Play also fosters self-confidence and emotional regulation, promoting collaboration, communication, and the expression of ideas and feelings. Additionally, play provides caregivers with opportunities to observe children's behavior and intervene if necessary, offering support for developmental delays or trauma.

- Pretend Play:

Pretend play, or "make-believe play," involves acting out scenarios and exploring different perspectives. While some studies question the impact of pretend play on child development, others suggest it can enhance language usage, awareness of others' perspectives, and self-regulation in areas such as empathy and delayed gratification. Pretend play may also improve social skills, such as problem-solving and communication. Play-based learning experiences provide caregivers with valuable insights into children's behavior, enabling early interventions when necessary.

== Play-based learning programs ==
Play-based learning programs encompass a variety of educational approaches that enhance children's learning experiences through engaging play activities. These programs emphasize the development of skills such as listening, concentration, communication, and self-direction.

According to the National Association for the Education of Young Children (NAEYC), teachers can support play based learning by observing children's interests, planning meaningful activities, and providing guidance while allowing children to make choices.

Enriched Curriculum

The Enriched Curriculum is designed to enhance children's learning experiences by incorporating play-based learning. This curriculum combines outdoor physical activities with indoor play in smaller group settings to promote children's development. Critics have expressed concerns about the Enriched Curriculum, particularly its potential to delay reading and writing lessons, needing extra resources and its ability to cater to different types of learners.

Notable Play-Based Learning Programs

1. High/Scope-is a cognitive approach that involves children actively in their own learning. It offers 58 key experiences and uses a plan-do-review approach during learning center time. This method helps children take responsibility for their own learning while adults serve as facilitators of play.
2. Creative Curriculum-Creative Curriculum is an early childhood teaching approach that emphasizes social and emotional development. It uses project-based investigations to allow children to apply skills and addresses four areas of development: social/emotional, physical, cognitive, and language.
3. Montessori Method-The Montessori Method promotes self-directed activity and clinical observation on the part of the teacher. This approach adapts the learning environment to the child's development level, encouraging children to learn through play.
4. Ontario Full Day Early Learning Kindergarten Program-This program for 4- and 5-year-olds consists of exploration, investigation, and guided and explicit instruction.
5. Ontario Early Years Centres-These centers focus on play-based learning through parent-child interaction. Parents and caregivers can stay with the child and access information about available programs and services.
6. Reggio Emilia approach-is a child-directed curriculum model that follows the children's interests. It emphasizes purposeful progression and emergent curriculum without a predetermined teacher-directed sequence.
7. Project Approach- The Project Approach involves preschoolers in studies of nearby topics that interest them. This teacher-instructed approach introduces new vocabulary and provides opportunities for informal conversation (Dfuss,2019).

=== Benefits of Different Types of Play in Child Development ===
==== Free Play ====
Free play is observed when children engage in activities based on their preferences, making their own choices regarding what they do and how they do it. It often occurs spontaneously, is enjoyable, and encourages imaginative thinking. This type of play typically unfolds without specific rules imposed by adults, allowing children the freedom to explore, express creativity, and experiment with different approaches.

This type of play is believed to allow children to tap into their creativity and problem-solving abilities as they tackle different tasks and obstacles independently. It also offers them opportunities to express themselves and participate in imaginative scenarios, potentially boosting cognitive development and fostering positive social interactions with peers. Some research suggests that free play may nurture imagination and social skills, which are seen as important for overall growth (Weisberg, Hirsh-Pasek, and Golinkoff, 2013).

Examples of how free play might foster imagination include

- Playing to Learn Words

Some studies indicate that children from less privileged backgrounds may benefit from playful learning in vocabulary acquisition (Han, Moore, Vukelich, & Buell, 2010).

- Learning by Exploring

Research suggests that children may perform better academically when they receive some guidance while exploring independently, compared to being left entirely on their own (Alfieri, Brooks, Aldrich, & Tenenbaum, 2010).

- Shapes and Play

Studies have found that children may grasp concepts like shapes more effectively when they engage in playful activities (Fisher, Hirsh-Pasek, Newcombe, & Golinkoff).

==== Teacher-directed play ====
This type of play allows teachers to lead structured activities to teach new concepts and skills. It promotes valuable learning opportunities, teamwork, following instructions, and cooperative learning among children.

==== Mutually directed play ====
Hope-Southcott(2013) and McLennan(2012), Introduce a type of play that entails collaboration between children and teachers in play activities, fostering learning through shared experiences and interaction. Additionally, encourage communication, negotiation, and decision-making skills while promoting positive teacher-student relationships and peer interactions.

Examples of how mutually directed play is beneficial for both children and adults

- Environmental Preparation

Adults set up the play environment with specific toys or materials to support learning. For example, a teacher might choose toys for a classroom activity, or a museum might design exhibits for children to explore.

- Scaffolding Children's Actions

Adults can help children during play by asking questions like "What do you think would happen if...". These questions gently guide children towards learning without rushing them.

- Incorporating Objects

Adults introduce new objects during play to spark children's curiosity. For instance, they might say, "I wonder what would happen if you try using this one?" This lets children explore while still focusing on learning.

=== Diverse Play Adaptations: Enhancing Learning and Development. ===
Adapting Play to Meet the Needs of Children with Disabilities

Teachers can adapt play to meet the needs of children with disabilities or special needs in various ways. According to Sharifah & Aliza 2013, effective lesson planning tailored to students' specific needs and abilities can enhance the educational experience for all students. Selecting suitable techniques and strategies for each lesson topic and learning objective supports the diverse needs of students. Utilizing appropriate learning aids, such as visual or tactile resources, can also improve accessibility and engagement. Researcher Nor Azlinah (2010), found that encouraging collaborative learning allows students to work in groups and benefit from social interaction.

Benefits of Play-Based Learning for Children with Disabilities

Play-based learning offers numerous benefits for children with various types of disabilities. It supports cognitive and language development, particularly for children with autism spectrum disorders. Research from the American Academy of Pediatrics highlights that play supports language, cognitive, and social development by helping children build communication skills, problem solving abilities, and emotional understanding. Play-based learning also promotes emotional and social development by fostering positive interactions and cooperation among students. By considering different approaches and techniques, teachers can create inclusive learning environments that support the diverse needs of their students.

These insights provide an overview of how play can be adapted to meet the needs of children with disabilities and how play-based learning benefits children with various types of disabilities.

== See also ==
- Children's street culture
- Educational entertainment
- Home zone / Play street
