= Agras =

Agras is a surname. Notable people with the surname include:

- William Stewart Agras (born 1929), American psychologist
- Tellos Agras (1880–1907), officer of the Hellenic Army who played a prominent role during the Greek Struggle for Macedonia

== See also ==
- Agras, Pella, a village in the municipal unit of Edessa, Greece
- DJI Agras, a Chinese agriculture drone
