= David H. Barlow =

American psychologist

- Born: David Harrison Barlow; April 30, 1942 (age 84); Needham, Massachusetts, U.S.
- Education: University of Notre Dame (BA), Boston College (MA), University of Vermont (PhD)
- Known for: Origins, nature, and treatments of anxiety and related disorders; Conceptualization of generalized anxiety disorder and panic disorder; Unified Protocol for transdiagnostic treatment
- Spouse: Beverly Colby (m. 1966)
- Children: 2 children and 4 grandchildren
- Awards: APA Distinguished Scientific Award for the Applications of Psychology (2000); Aaron T. Beck Award (2005); American Board of Professional Psychology (ABPP) Distinguished Service Award to the Profession of Psychology (2006); James McKeen Cattell Fellow Award (2012); American Psychological Foundation's 2018 Gold Medal Award for Life Achievement in the Practice of Psychology (2018)
- Scientific career
- Fields: Clinical Psychology, Anxiety disorders, Cognitive behavioral therapy
- Workplaces: Boston University
- Notable students: Steven C. Hayes, Kelly D. Brownell
- Website: http://bostonanxietytreatment.com

David H. Barlow (born April 30, 1942) is an American psychologist and Professor Emeritus of Psychology and Psychiatry at Boston University. He is board certified by the American Board of Professional Psychology. Barlow is known for his research and publications on the etiology, nature, and treatment of anxiety disorders. The models and treatment methods that he developed for anxiety and related disorders are widely used in clinical training and practice. Barlow is one of the most frequently cited psychologists in the world.

Barlow has published over 650 articles and book chapters, as well as over 100 books and clinical manuals, some of which has been translated to more than 20 languages. He is best known for his book titled, Anxiety and Its Disorders: The Nature and Treatment of Anxiety and Panic.

Barlow has received numerous awards for his contributions to the field of psychology, including the American Psychological Association (APA) Distinguished Scientific Award for the Applications of Psychology, the James McKeen Cattell Fellow Award from the Association for Psychological Science for "distinguished achievements in psychological science", and Distinguished Lifetime Achievement Awards from the Connecticut, California, and Massachusetts Psychological Associations. He also has been awarded honorary doctoral degrees from the University of Vermont and William James College, the Career/Lifetime Achievement Award from the Association for Behavioral and Cognitive Therapies (ABCT), and the American Psychological Foundation's 2018 Gold Medal Award for Life Achievement in the Practice of Psychology.

Barlow is currently Founder of the Center for Anxiety and Related Disorders and Professor of Psychology and Brain Sciences, and Psychiatry, Emeritus at Boston University.

== Background and early life ==
Barlow was born in Needham, Massachusetts, U.S., in 1942. His father left to fight in World War II shortly before he was born and was killed in action. Barlow grew up living with his mother and maternal grandparents.

Influenced by his grandfather and uncle, Barlow cultivated a passion for sports at a young age. As a child, Barlow had even entertained the idea of a professional career in sports, especially after his baseball team made it to the Little League World Series when he was 12. Yet, Barlow was also an avid reader and a scholar of classical languages, having studied six years of Latin and two years of Greek in high school. His early literary pursuits fueled his continued fascination with the written word.

== Education ==
Barlow attended the University of Notre Dame in 1960, for an undergraduate degree in sociology and English. During intensive studies of literature, Barlow became intrigued by the often self-defeating actions of fictional characters, and he began analyzing the psychological motivations of such acts in his literary discourse.

To pursue his interest in psychology, Barlow attended Boston College in 1964. He was a student of Joseph R. Cautela, one of the pioneers in behavior therapy who eventually became president of the Association for Behavioral and Cognitive Therapies (ABCT), formerly known as the Association for Advancement of Behavior Therapy (AABT). Barlow delved into the realm of experimental psychology in Cautela's research laboratories. He was convinced by Cautela that the practical applications of psychology can only advance through a scientific approach to the subject. In the summer of 1966, Barlow worked with Joseph Wolpe, widely known as the father of behavior therapy, to gain clinical experience in Wolpe's emerging techniques of systematic desensitization, assertiveness training, and reciprocal inhibition.

In the same fall, Barlow left Boston to attend the University of Vermont for his doctoral degree. He worked under Harold Leitenberg and Stewart Agras who were collaborating on a clinical research program at the time. Together, they developed a new experimental approach to clinical research, later known as single case experimental designs, for which Barlow eventually published a sourcebook. Barlow received his Ph.D. in 1969.

== Career ==
=== 1969–1979 ===
After completing his PhD, Barlow became an assistant professor of psychiatry at the University of Mississippi Medical Center (UMMC) in 1969. He founded the clinical psychology internship program there, with the aim of training students on science-based clinical practices. In 1974, he was promoted to professor of psychiatry.

In 1975, Barlow relocated to Brown University with a joint appointment as professor of psychiatry and psychology, and Director of Education and Training at Butler Hospital. At Brown, Barlow was again in charge of creating a clinical psychology internship program, which had been successful at the UMMC. Barlow was to spend five years at Brown. In 1979, Barlow served as the president of the Association for Behavioral and Cognitive Therapies (ABCT). Throughout this time, Barlow broadened and deepened his research on anxiety and related disorders, but also developed a research program on understanding sexual behaviors and gender expression. Some of this work included treating individuals with "sexual deviations" which at the time included homosexual men with behavioral techniques including covert sensitization, fading, biofeedback fading, and classical conditioning, a practice that is now known as conversion therapy. One of the studies details changes in gender identity expression that were attributed to an exorcism by the patient.

He expressed deep regret for including homosexual men in this work on several occasions, but after suggestions to retract the articles stated that he does not believe these articles could be retracted, saying that "[t]he only reason you can really retract a journal article, based on my understanding, and I've been an editor myself, is if you have some evidence that the data were manipulated or fabricated or false, and the science is wrong," He added "I don't think you can retract an article because times have changed, or you have a different view of it now and you don't like the conclusion. The journal publishers agreed with that position.

=== 1979–1996 ===
In 1979, Barlow accepted a position as professor (and later, distinguished professor) of psychology at the State University of New York at Albany. It was here where Barlow was able to focus more deeply on clinical research. Together with his colleague and friend, Edward B. Blanchard, Barlow founded the Center of Stress and Anxiety Disorders, which became a large federally funded research clinic. In addition to continuing his early research on the relationship between anxiety and sexual dysfunction, Barlow also studied the nosology and treatment of anxiety and related disorders. Together with his colleagues, he started to develop new treatment methods for the anxiety disorders, most notably, the treatment of panic disorder developed with Michelle Craske, and Ron Rapee. In addition to this work, several additional articles were published based on earlier work to characterize differences in gender identity expression as well as using behavioral treatments to change sexual orientation and gender expression.

As Barlow's ideas of the nature and origins of anxiety started to become more elaborate, he published a series of books that delineated the results from his research and advocated for a more empirical scientific approach to clinical psychology. In 1985, he published the first edition of the Clinical handbook of psychological disorders: A step-by-step treatment manual, explicating evidence based practices. Aggregating his ideas from this period of extensive research, Barlow published what the American Psychologist deemed as his "most influential book", Anxiety and its disorders: The nature and treatment of anxiety and panic.

From 1984 to 1994, Barlow served on work groups for the third (revised) edition and on the task force for the fourth edition of the Diagnostic and Statistical Manual of Mental Disorders, (abbreviated to DSM-III-R and DSM-IV, respectively). He was instrumental in developing the criteria for classifying anxiety disorders in both revisions. In 1993, Barlow was elected the president of the American Psychological Association, Division of Clinical Psychology.

=== 1996–present ===
In 1996, Barlow returned to Boston to serve as a professor of psychology and psychiatry at Boston University. He also took on the roles of Director of Clinical Training Programs and Director of the Center for Anxiety and Related Disorders. At Boston University, he continued updating and deepening his theories of the origins and nature of anxiety disorders. With his team at the Center for Anxiety and Related Disorders at Boston University, Barlow developed the Unified Protocol for transdiagnostic treatments of anxiety related disorders. He continues to conduct research on the efficacy and treatment mechanisms of the protocol and is working to enhance dissemination.

In 2016 Barlow retired from active teaching but continued with an active program of research funded mostly by NIH focused for the most part on further developing and disseminating the unified protocol. In 2023 he turned over remaining NIH and foundation grants as well as the administration of the unified protocol research lab to his longtime associate Dr. Todd Farchione. He continues to lecture or participate in interviews, mostly on podcasts.

== Selected awards and honors ==
Barlow has received over 40 awards and honors for his contributions to the understanding and treatment of anxiety and related disorders, including, but not limited to:

- 1987—1997 National Institute of Mental Health MERIT Award

"Awarded to investigators whose research competence and productivity are distinctly superior and who are likely to continue to perform in an outstanding manner"

- 2000 American Psychological Association Distinguished Scientific Award for the Applications of Psychology

"Awarded for his contribution to our understanding of the nature of anxiety and anxiety disorders with the goal of developing reliable and effective psychological treatments, and as the principal psychologist in the work group on the anxiety disorders for the Diagnostic and Statistical Manual of Mental Disorders (DSM), he was instrumental in seeing that Psychology's contributions to the field were heeded."

- 2000 Distinguished Scientific Contribution Award, Society of Clinical Psychology (Division 12), American Psychological Association
- 2001 Award in Appreciation of Outstanding Achievements, General Hospital of the Chinese People's Liberation Army, Beijing, China. With appointment as Honorary Visiting Professor of Clinical Psychology
- 2001 Distinguished Lifetime Achievement Award, California Psychological Association
- 2001 Career Contribution Award, Massachusetts Psychological Association
- 2004 Outstanding Lifetime Contribution to Psychology Award, Connecticut Psychological Association
- 2004 Honorary Doctor of Humane Letters, William James College (formerly Massachusetts School of Professional Psychology)
- 2006 American Board of Professional Psychology (ABPP) Distinguished Service Award to the Profession of Psychology
- 2012 James McKeen Cattell Fellow Award, Association for Psychological Science

"In recognition of his distinguished achievements in psychological science"

- 2014 American Psychological Association Presidential Citation

"For his lifelong dedication and passion for advancing psychology through science education training and practice"

- 2014 Identified as Highly Cited Researcher by Thomson-Reuters' Institute for Scientific Information
- 2015 Honorary Doctorate of Science, University of Vermont
- 2015 Appointed Honorary President of the Canadian Psychological Association
- 2018 2nd APA Presidential Citation; "He has had a far reaching impact on many psychologists of color and has shaped the future of the discipline in valuing and supporting the potential of all students"
- 2023 Wellner Award “for his seminal research investigating the etiology and clinical treatment of anxiety disorders, which fundamentally changed how health service psychologists treat such conditions”
- Publications

=== Selected books ===
- Barlow, D.H. (2002). Anxiety and its disorders: The nature and treatment of anxiety and panic (2nd ed.). New York: The Guilford Press. ISBN 1-57230-430-8 [1st edition published in 1988, ISBN 0-89862-720-6]
- Barlow, D.H., Nock, M.K., & Hersen, M. (2009). Single case experimental designs: Strategies for studying behavior change (3rd ed.). Boston: Pearson Allyn & Bacon. ISBN 0-205-47455-1
- McHugh, R. K., & Barlow, D. H. (Eds.). (2012). Dissemination and implementation of evidence-based psychological interventions. New York: Oxford University Press. ISBN 0-19-538905-0
- Barlow, D. H. (Ed.). (2014). The Oxford handbook of clinical psychology. New York: Oxford University Press. ISBN 0-19-932871-4
- Barlow, D.H. (Ed.). (2014). Clinical handbook of psychological disorders: A step-by-step treatment manual. (5th ed.). New York, NY: Guilford Press. ISBN 1-4625-1326-3
- Barlow, D. H. (2015). The neurotic paradox: Progress in understanding and treating anxiety and related disorders (Vols. 1–2). New York, NY: Routledge. ISBN 1-138-85079-9, ISBN 1-138-65981-9
- Barlow, D. H., & Farchione, T. J. (Eds.). (2017). Applications of the Unified Protocol for Transdiagnostic Treatment of Emotional Disorders. Oxford University Press. ISBN 0-19-025554-4
- Barlow, D. H., & Durand, V. M. (2018). Abnormal psychology: An integrative approach (8th ed.). Barlow, Durand & Hoffman, 9th ed. (2022), Wadsworth/Cengage. ISBN 1-305-95044-5
- Sauer-Zavala & Barlow, Neuroticism: A New Framework for Emotional Disorders and Their Treatment (2021), Guilford Press

=== Selected clinical manuals ===
- Craske, M.G., & Barlow, D.H. (2007). Mastery of your anxiety and panic: Workbook for primary care settings. New York, New York: Oxford University Press. ISBN 0-19-531134-5
- Craske, M.G., & Barlow, D.H. (2006). Mastery of your anxiety and Worry. New York, New York: Oxford University Press. ISBN 0-19-530001-7
- Barlow, D.H., Rapee, R.M., & Perini, S. (2014). 10 Steps to Mastering Stress: A lifestyle approach, Updated edition. New York, New York, Oxford University Press. ISBN 0-19-991753-1
- Barlow, D.H., Farchione, T.J., Sauer-Zavala, S., Latin, H., Ellard, K.K., Bullis, J.R., ...Cassiello-Robbins, C. (2017). Unified Protocol for Transdiagnostic Treatment of Emotional Disorders: Therapist guide. (2nd ed.) New York: Oxford University Press. ISBN 0-19-068597-2

=== Selected chapters and articles ===
- Agras, W. S., Leitenberg, H., & Barlow, D. H. (1968). Social reinforcement in the modification of agoraphobia. Archives of General Psychiatry, 19, 423–427. doi:10.1001/archpsyc.1968.01740100039006
- Barlow, D. H. (1981). On the relation of clinical research to clinical practice: Current issues, new directions. Journal of Consulting and Clinical Psychology, 49, 147–156. doi:10.1037/0022-006X.49.2.147
- Barlow, D. H. (1986). The causes of sexual dysfunction: The role of anxiety and cognitive interference. Journal of Consulting and Clinical Psychology, 54, 140–148. doi:10.1037/0022-006x.54.2.140
- Barlow, D. H., Blanchard, E. B., Vermilyea, J. A., Vermilyea, B. B., & Di Nardo, P. A. (1986). Generalized anxiety and generalized anxiety disorder: Description and reconceptualization. American Journal of Psychiatry, 143, 40–44. doi:10.1176/ajp.143.1.40
- Barlow, D. H. (1991a). Disorders of emotion. Psychological Inquiry, 2, 58–71. doi:10.1207/s15327965pli0201_15
- Barlow, D. H. (1991b). Introduction to the special issue on diagnosis, dimensions, and DSM-IV: The science of classification. Journal of Abnormal Psychology, 100, 243–244. doi:10.1037/h0092428
- Barlow, D. H., Brown, T. A., & Craske, M. G. (1994). Definitions of panic attack and panic disorder in DSM-IV: Implications for research. Journal of Abnormal Psychology, 103, 553–564. doi:10.1037/0021-843x.103.3.553
- Barlow, D. H. (1996). Health care policy, psychotherapy research, and the future of psychotherapy. American Psychologist, 51, 1050–1058. doi:10.1037/0003-066x.51.10.1050
- Chorpita, B. F., & Barlow, D. H. (1998). The development of anxiety: The role of control in the early environment. Psychological Bulletin, 124, 3–21. doi:10.1037/0033-2909.124.1.3
- Barlow, D. H., Gorman, J. M., Shear, M. K., & Woods, S. W. (2000). Cognitive-behavioral therapy, imipramine or their combination for panic disorder: A randomized controlled trial. JAMA, 283, 2529–2536. doi:10.1001/jama.283.19.2529
- Barlow, D.H. (2000). Unraveling the mysteries of anxiety and its disorders from the perspective of emotion theory. American Psychologist, 55(11), 1245–1263. doi:10.1037/0003-066x.55.11.1247
- Bouton, M.E., Mineka, S., & Barlow, D.H. (2001). A modern learning-theory perspective on the etiology of panic disorder. Psychological Review, 108, 4–32. doi:10.1037/0033-295x.108.1.4
- Barlow, D.H. (2004). Psychological treatments. American Psychologist, 59(9), 869–878. doi:10.1037/0003-066X.59.9.869
- Barlow, D.H., Allen, L.B., & Choate, M.L. (2004). Toward a unified treatment for emotional disorders. Behavior Therapy, 35, 205–230. doi:10.1016/s0005-7894(04)80036-4
- Barlow, D.H., & Nock, M.K. (2009). Why can't we be more idiographic in our research?. Perspectives on Psychological Science, 4(1), 19–21. doi:10.1111/j.1745-6924.2009.01088.x
- Barlow, D. H. (2010). Negative effects from psychological treatments: A perspective. American Psychologist, 65(1), 13–20. doi:10.1037/a0015643
- McHugh, R. K., & Barlow, D. H. (2010). Dissemination and implementation of evidence-based psychological interventions: A review of current efforts. American Psychologist, 65(2), 73–84. doi:10.1037/a0018121
- Barlow, D.H. (2011). A prolegomenon to clinical psychology: Two 40-year odysseys. In D.H. Barlow (Ed.), The Oxford handbook of clinical psychology (pp. 3–20). New York, NY: Oxford University Press. doi:10.1093/oxfordhb/9780195366884.013.0001
- Barlow, D. H., Bullis, J. R., Comer, J. S., & Ametaj, A. A. (2013). Evidence-based psychological treatments: An update and a way forward. In S. Nolen-Hoeksema, T.D. Cannon, & T. Widiger (Eds.), Annual Review of Clinical Psychology (Vol. 9, pp. 1–27). Palo Alto, CA: Annual Reviews. doi:10.1146/annurev-clinpsy-050212-185629
- Ciraulo, D. A., Barlow, D. H., Gulliver, S. B., Farchione, T., Morissette, S. B., Kamholz, B. W., ... Knapp, C. M. (2013). The effects of venlafaxine and cognitive behavioral therapy alone and combined in the treatment of co-morbid alcohol use-anxiety disorders. Behaviour Research and Therapy, 51(11), 729–735. doi:10.1016/j.brat.2013.08.003
- Barlow, D. H. (2014). The neuroscience of psychological treatments. Behaviour Research and Therapy, 62, 143–145. doi:10.1016/j.brat.2014.09.003
- Barlow, D. H., Ellard, K. K., Sauer-Zavala, S., Bullis, J. R., & Carl, J. R. (2014). The origins of neuroticism. Perspectives on Psychological Science, 9(5), 481–496. doi:10.1177/1745691614544528
- Barlow, D.H., Sauer-Zavala, S., Carl, J.R., Bullis, J.R., & Ellard, K.K. (2014). The nature, diagnosis, and treatment of neuroticism: Back to the future. Clinical Psychological Science, 2(3), 344–365. doi:10.1177/2167702613505532
- Barlow DH, Farchione TJ, Bullis JR, et al. (2017). The Unified Protocol for Transdiagnostic Treatment of Emotional Disorders Compared With Diagnosis-Specific Protocols for Anxiety Disorders: A Randomized Clinical Trial. JAMA Psychiatry, 74(9), 875–884. doi:10.1001/jamapsychiatry.2017.2164
- · Sauer-Zavala et al. (2017), "Current Definitions of ‘Transdiagnostic’ in Treatment Development," Behavior Therapy 48(1), 128–138
- Bullis et al. (2019), "What is an emotional disorder?," Clinical Psychology Science and Practice 26(2)
- Barlow, Curreri & Woodard (2021), "Neuroticism & disorders of emotion," Current Directions in Psychological Science 30(5), 410–417
- Farchione et al. (2024), "State of the Science: The Unified Transdiagnostic Treatment of Emotional Disorders," Behavior Therapy 55(6), 1189–1204
