= Amy Mezulis =

American clinical psychologist and researcher

Amy Mezulis is an American clinical psychologist and researcher, based at Seattle Pacific University since 2006.

== Early life and education ==
Mezulis earned a BA from Harvard University and an MA and PhD in clinical psychology from the University of Wisconsin–Madison. She completed her pre-doctoral fellowship at the Veterans Affairs' Puget Sound Health Care System – Seattle and her postdoctoral fellowship at Seattle Children's Hospital.

Mezulis was married to Matt Bencke who co-founded Mighty AI. Bencke died in 2017.

== Career ==
Mezulis began her tenure at Seattle Pacific University's Department of Clinical Psychology as an assistant professor from 2006 to 2013. She then served as an associate professor from 2013 to 2019, while also assuming the role of director of research from 2014 to 2017.

Mezulis chaired the department from 2017 to 2021, and she has been a full professor since 2019.

In 2019, Mezulis co-founded Joon Care, a company that provides therapeutic services to teens and young adults.

As an author, she writes general audience articles for Psychology Today.

== Research ==
Mezulis' research is supported by organizations such as the National Institute of Mental Health and the American Psychological Association. Her research examines the interplay of environment and biology in mental health. With over 50 peer-reviewed studies, her focus lies in adolescent depression, self-injury, and other clinical disorders. Her therapeutic approach emphasizes stress management, regulation of emotions, and addressing issues such as eating, sleeping, and trauma.

In 2001, a study conducted by Janet Shibley Hyde and Mezulis reached the conclusion that gender differences are often minimal and infrequent in comparison to the significant similarities between the sexes.

In a 2004 meta-analysis encompassing 266 studies, Mezulis and her fellow researchers identified significant cross-cultural differences in self-serving bias. The findings revealed that Asians exhibit considerably smaller biases compared to Westerners. In the same study, Mezulis and her team identified a "self-serving" bias trend, where individuals attribute positive events to internal, stable causes more than negative ones. This bias was less evident in those with psychological illnesses, suggesting reduced psychological benefits from positive interpretations.
