= Sex differences in humans =

Difference between males and females

Sex differences in humans have been studied in a variety of fields. Sex determination generally occurs by the presence or absence of a Y chromosome in the 23rd pair of chromosomes in the human genome. Phenotypic sex refers to an individual's sex as determined by their internal and external genitalia and expression of secondary sex characteristics.

Sex differences generally refer to traits that are sexually dimorphic. A subset of such differences is hypothesized to be the product of the evolutionary process of sexual selection.

== Physiology ==
Sex differences in human physiology are distinctions of physiological characteristics associated with either male or female humans. These can be of several types, including direct and indirect, direct being the direct result of differences prescribed by the Y-chromosome (due to the SRY gene), and indirect being characteristics influenced indirectly (e.g., hormonally) by the Y-chromosome. Sexual dimorphism is a term for the genotypic and phenotypic differences between males and females of the same species.

Through the process of meiosis and fertilization (with rare exceptions), each individual is created with zero or one Y-chromosome. The complementary result for the X-chromosome follows, either a double or a single X. Therefore, direct sex differences are usually binary in expression, although the deviations in more complex biological processes produce a variety of exceptions.

Indirect sex differences are general differences as quantified by empirical data and statistical analysis. Most differing characteristics will conform to a bell-curve (i.e., normal) distribution which can be broadly described by the mean (peak distribution) and standard deviation (indicator of size of range). Often only the mean or mean difference between sexes is given. This may or may not preclude overlap in distributions. For example, males are, on average, taller than females, but an individual female could be taller than an individual male. The extents of these differences vary across different regions and populations. Sexual dimorphism for specific traits in humans may be due to a variety of factors such as environmental influences, genetic variation, or hormonal effects.

The most obvious differences between males and females include all the features related to reproductive roles, notably the endocrine (hormonal) systems and their physiological and behavioral effects, including gonadal differentiation, internal and external genital and breast differentiation, and differentiation of muscle mass, height, and hair distribution. There are also differences in the structure of specific areas of the brain. For example, on average, the SDN (INAH3 in humans) has been repeatedly found to be considerably larger in males than in females. A brain study done by the NIH showed that the females had greater volume in the prefrontal cortex, orbitofrontal cortex, superior temporal cortex, lateral parietal cortex, and insula, whereas males had greater volume in the ventral temporal and occipital regions.

=== Medicine ===
Sex differences in medicine include sex-specific diseases, which are diseases that occur only in people of one sex; and sex-related diseases, which are diseases that are more usual to one sex, or which manifest differently in each sex. For example, certain autoimmune diseases may occur predominantly in one sex, for unknown reasons. 90% of primary biliary cirrhosis cases are women, whereas primary sclerosing cholangitis is more common in men. Gender-based medicine, also called "gender medicine", is the field of medicine that studies the biological and physiological differences between the human sexes and how that affects differences in disease. Traditionally, medical research has mostly been conducted using the male body as the basis for clinical studies. Similar findings are also reported in the sport medicine literature where males typically account for >60% of the individuals studied. The findings of these studies have often been applied across the sexes and healthcare providers have assumed a uniform approach in treating both male and female patients. More recently, medical research has started to understand the importance of taking the sex into account as the symptoms and responses to medical treatment may be very different between sexes.

== Psychology ==
Research on biological sex differences in human psychology investigates cognitive and behavioral differences between men and women. This research employs experimental tests of cognition, which take a variety of forms. Tests focus on possible differences in areas such as IQ, spatial reasoning, aggression, emotion, and brain structure and function.

Chromosomal makeup is important in human psychology. Females normally have two X chromosomes while males typically have an X and a Y chromosome. The X chromosome is more active and encodes more information than the Y chromosome, which has been shown to affect behavior. Genetic researchers theorize that the X chromosome may contain a gene influencing social behaviours.

Most IQ tests are constructed so that there are no overall score differences between females and males. Areas where differences have been found include verbal and mathematical ability. IQ tests that measure fluid g and have not been constructed to eliminate sex differences also tend to show that sex differences are either non-existent or negligible. 2008 research found that, for grades 2 to 11, there were no significant gender differences in math skills among the general population. Differences in variability of IQ scores have been observed in studies, with more men falling at the extremes of the spectrum.

Because social and environmental factors affect brain activity and behavior, where differences are found, it can be difficult for researchers to assess whether or not the differences are innate. Some studies showing that differences are due to socially assigned roles (nurture), while other studies show that differences are due to inherent differences (natural or innate). Studies on this topic explore the possibility of social influences on how both sexes perform in cognitive and behavioral tests. Stereotypes about differences between men and women have been shown to affect a person's behavior (this is called stereotype threat).

In his book titled Gender, Nature, and Nurture, psychologist Richard Lippa found that there were large differences in women's and men's preferences for realistic occupations (for example, mechanic or carpenters) and moderate differences in their preferences for social and artistic occupations. His results also found that women tend to be more people-oriented and men more thing-oriented.

Hartung & Widiger (1998) found that many kinds of mental illnesses and behavioral problems show gender differences in prevalence and incidence. "Of the 80 disorders diagnosed in adulthood for which sex ratios are provided, 35 are said to be more common in men than in women (17 of which are substance related or a paraphilia), 31 are said to be more common in women than men, and 14 are said to be equally common in both sexes."

Differences in male and female jealousy can also be observed. While female jealousy is more likely to be inspired by emotional infidelity, male jealousy is most likely to be brought on by sexual infidelity. A clear majority of approximately 62% to 86% of women reported that they would be more bothered by emotional infidelity and 47% to 60% of men reported that they would be more bothered by sexual infidelity.

In 2005, Janet Shibley Hyde from the University of Wisconsin-Madison introduced the gender similarities hypothesis, which suggests that males and females are similar on most, but not all, psychological variables. The research focused on cognitive variables (for example, reading comprehension, mathematics), communication (for example, talkativeness, facial expressions), social and personality (for example, aggression, sexuality), psychological well-being, and motor behaviors. Using results from a review of 46 meta-analyses, she found that 78% of gender differences were small or close to zero. A few exceptions were some motor behaviors (such as throwing distance) and some aspects of sexuality (such as attitudes about casual sex), which show the largest gender differences. She concludes her article by stating: "It is time to consider the costs of overinflated claims of gender differences. Arguably, they cause harm in numerous realms, including women's opportunities in the workplace, couple conflict and communication, and analyses of self-esteem problems among adolescents." Hyde also stated elsewhere that "variations within genders are greater than variations between genders." However, another paper argued that the gender similarities hypothesis was untestable as currently formulated because it does not provide a metric for the psychological importance of relevant dimensions, nor a rule for counting dimensions; a small number of relevant differences may be more significant than a massive number of trivial similarities.

In 2011, Irina Trofimova found a significant female advantage in time on the lexical task and on the temperament scale of social-verbal tempo, and a male advantage on the temperament scale of physical endurance which were more pronounced in young age groups and faded in older groups. She suggested that there is a "middle age – middle sex" effect: sex differences in these two types of abilities observed in younger groups might be entangled with age and hormonal changes. The study concluded that a one-dimensional approach to sex differences (common in meta-analytic studies) therefore overlooks a possible interaction of sex differences with age. This hormones-based "middle age-middle sex effect", and also specifics of the few psychological sex differences (verbal and physical) were analysed in terms of the systemic evolutional tendencies driving sex dimorphism.

In 2021, Lise Eliot et al found no difference in overall male/female abilities in verbal, spatial or emotion processing. A 2022 follow-up meta-analysis refuted these finding based on methodological flaws, and concluded that "The human brain shows highly reproducible sex differences in regional brain anatomy above and beyond sex differences in overall brain size" and that these differences were of a "small-to-moderate effect size."

== Behavior ==
=== Crime ===
Statistics have been consistent in reporting that men commit more criminal acts than women. Self-reported delinquent acts are also higher for men than women across many different actions. Many professionals have offered explanations for this sex difference. Some differing explanations include men's evolutionary tendency toward risk and violent behavior, sex differences in activity, social support, and gender inequality. In particular, Lee Ellis' evolutionary neuroandrogenic theory posits that sexual selection has led to increased exposure to testosterone in males, causing greater competitive behavior which could lead to criminality.

Despite the difficulty of interpreting them, crime statistics may provide a way to investigate such a relationship from a gender differences perspective. An observable difference in crime rates between men and women might be due to social and cultural factors, crimes going unreported, or to biological factors (for example, testosterone or sociobiological theories). Taking the nature of the crime itself into consideration may also be a factor. Crime can be measured by such data as arrest records, imprisonment rates, and surveys. However, not all crimes are reported or investigated. Moreover, some studies show that men can have an overwhelming bias against reporting themselves to be the victims of a crime (particularly when victimized by a woman), and some studies have argued that men reporting intimate partner violence find disadvantageous biases in law enforcement. Burton et al. (1998) found that low levels of self control are associated with criminal activity.

=== Education ===
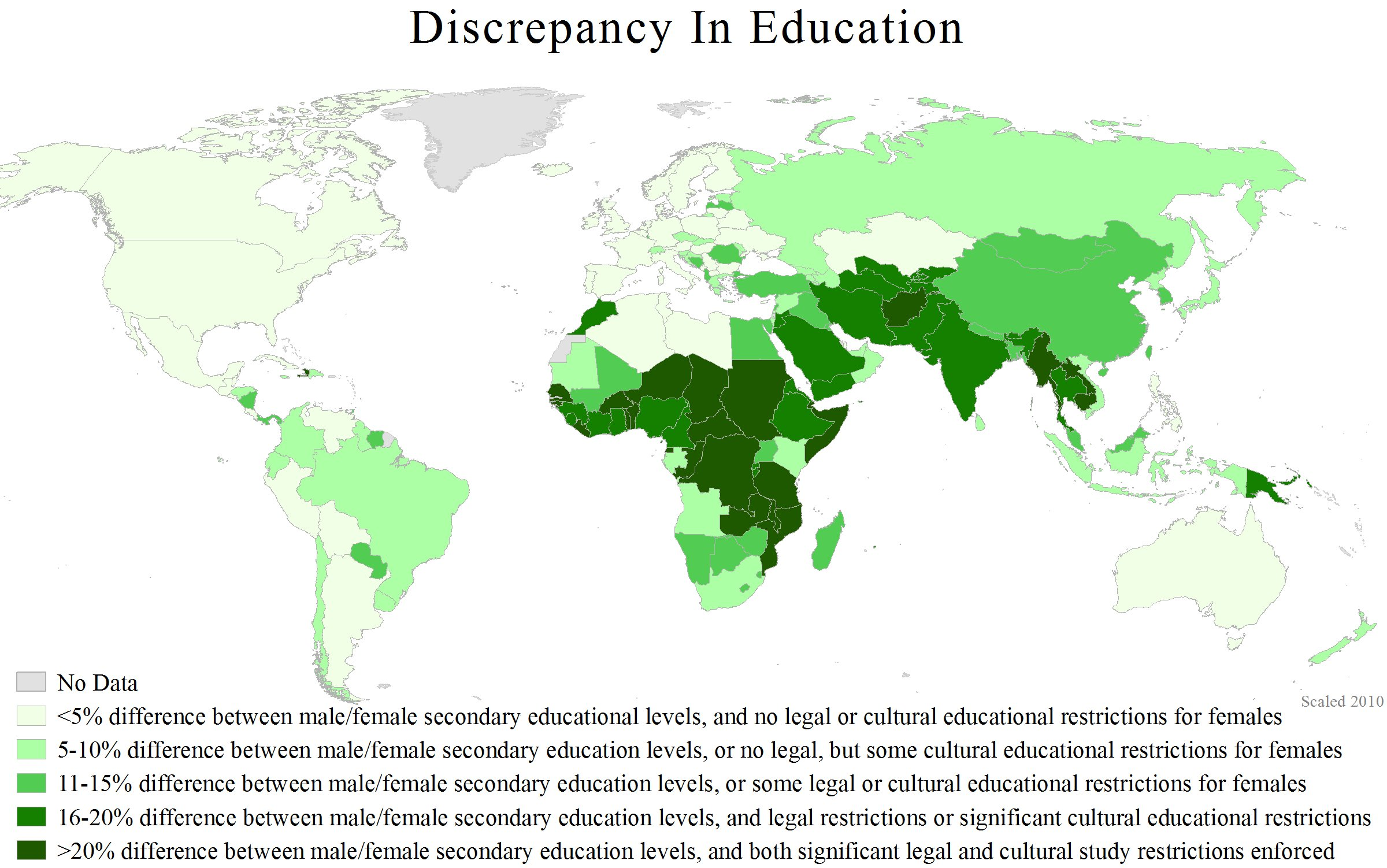
A world map showing countries by gender education disparity, 2010

Sometimes and in some places, there are sex differences in educational achievement. This may be caused by sex discrimination in law or culture, or may reflect natural differences in the interests of the sexes.

=== Leadership ===
Research has been undertaken to examine whether or not there are sex differences in leadership. Leadership positions continue to be dominated by men. Women were rarely seen in senior leadership positions leading to a lack of data on how they behave in such positions. The two main lines of research contradict one another, the first being that there are significant sex differences in leadership and the second being that gender does not have an effect on leadership.

Women and men have been surveyed by Gallup each year concerning workplace topics. When questioned about preferences of a female boss or a male boss, women chose a preference for a male boss 39% of the time, compared to 26% of men displaying preference for a male boss. Only 27% of women would prefer a boss of the same gender. This preference, among both sexes, for male leadership in the workplace has continued unabated for sixty years according to Gallup surveys.

=== Religion ===
Gender and religion is the study of gender within various religious traditions. It is the influence of religion on gender roles, economics, culture, politics and other roles women and men engage within religion and within societies at large.

=== Social capital ===
Sex differences in social capital are differences between men and women in their ability to coordinate actions and achieve their aims through trust, norms and networks. Social capital is often seen as the missing link in development; as social networks facilitate access to resources and protect the commons, while cooperation makes markets work more efficiently. Social capital has been thought of as women's capital as whereas there are gendered barriers to accessing economic capital, women's role in family, and community ensures that they have strong networks. There is potential that the concept can help to bring women's unpaid 'community and household labor', vital to survival and development, to the attention of economists. However, research analyzing social capital from a gendered perspective is rare, and the notable exceptions are very critical.

=== Suicide ===
Gender differences in suicide have been shown to be significant; there are highly asymmetric rates of suicide and suicide attempts between males and females. The gap, also called the gender paradox of suicidal behavior, can vary significantly between different countries. Statistics demonstrate that males die much more often by means of suicide than females do.

=== Financial risk-taking ===
Sex differences in financial decision making are relevant and significant. Numerous studies have found that women tend to be financially more risk-averse than men and hold safer portfolios. Scholarly research has documented systematic differences in financial decisions such as buying investments versus insurance, donating to ingroups versus outgroups (such as terrorism victims in Iraq versus the United States), spending in stores, and the endowment effect-or asking price for goods people have.

== See also ==
- Neuroscience of sex differences
- Sexual differentiation in humans
- Health survival paradox
