= Megan Gunnar =

American child psychologist

Megan R. Gunnar is an American child psychologist, currently Regents Professor and McKnight University Professor at University of Minnesota and an Elected Fellow of the American Academy of Arts & Sciences. In 2021, she will receive the James McKeen Cattell Lifetime Achievement Award for Applied Research from the Association for Psychological Science (APS). She is the main investigator for the International Adoption Project. She was elected a member of the National Academy of Sciences in 2022. She was awarded the James McKeen Cattell Fellow Award in 2021.

== Education ==
Gunnar received her PhD from Stanford University in 1978. She then did a postdoctoral fellowship at Stanford Medical School, in Developmental Psychoneuroendocrinology. She has a BA in psychology from Mills College.
