= Julia Adler-Milstein =

Professor of Medicine

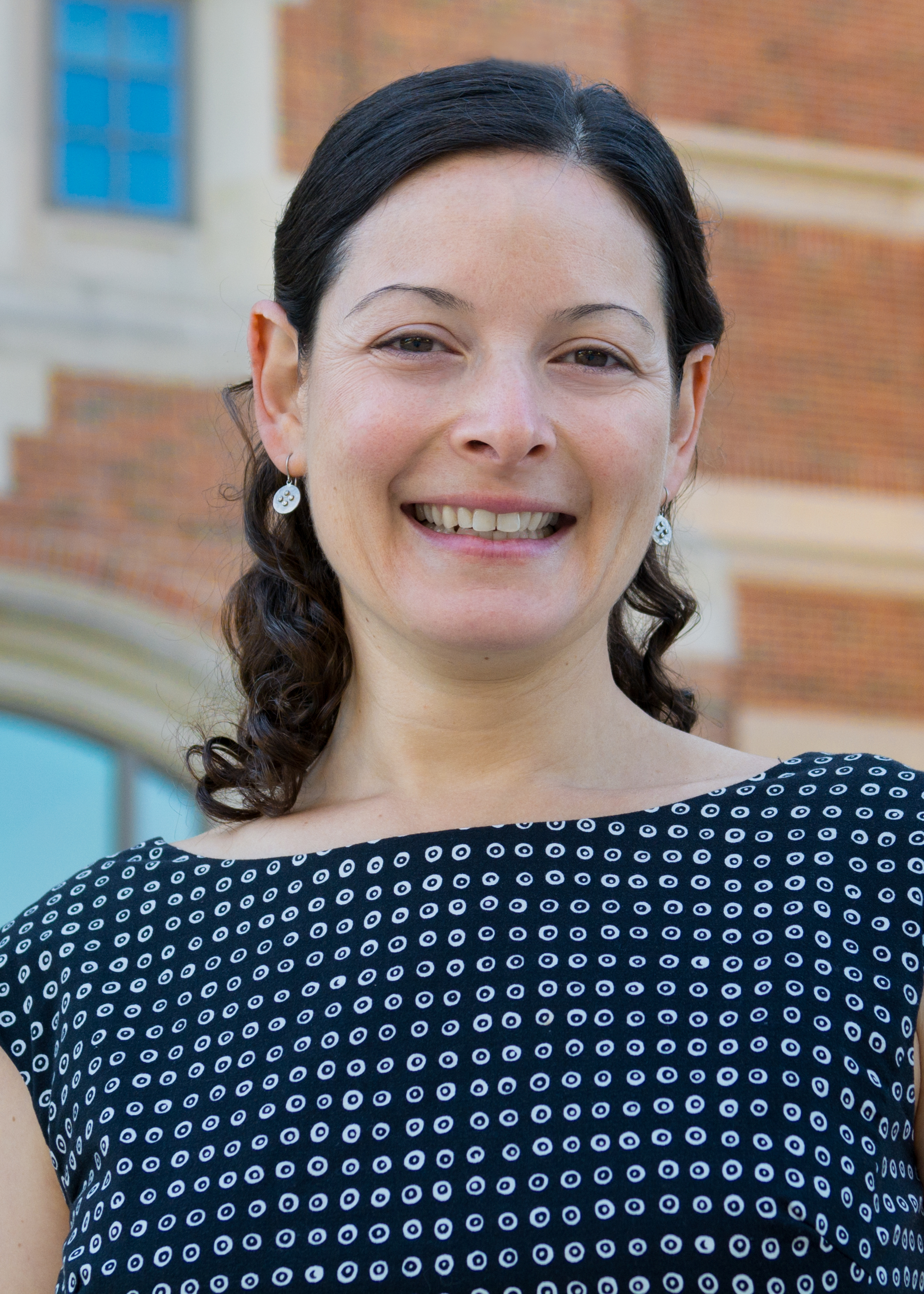
- Born: San Francisco, California, US
- Mother: Nancy Adler

Academic background
- Education: BS, Human Biology, 2001, Stanford University; PhD, Health Policy, 2011, Harvard University
- Thesis: The Use of Information Technology in US Health Care Delivery (2011)

Julia Rose Adler-Milstein is an American health informatician and policy expert in health IT infrastructure. She is a Professor of Medicine and Director of the Center for Clinical Informatics and Improvement Research at the University of California, San Francisco. In 2019, she was named a Member of the National Academy of Medicine.

== Early life and education ==
Adler-Milstein was born and raised in San Francisco and also spent much time growing up at a family home in Sonoma, California. She earned a Bachelor of Science degree from Stanford University and a PhD from Harvard University. Before enrolling at Harvard, Adler-Milstein worked in the Health and Life Sciences Division of Accenture and at the Center for IT Leadership at Partners Healthcare.

== Career ==
=== University of Michigan ===
Upon graduating from Harvard in 2011, Adler-Milstein joined the University of Michigan School of Information as an assistant professor with a joint appointment in the University of Michigan School of Public Health. In this role, she led a study which found that hospitals and doctors who participate in electronic health information exchange efforts had short term success but long-term concerns. The following year, she received the American Medical Informatics Association's 2014 New Investigator Award for "early informatics contributions and significant scholarly contributions on the basis of scientific merit and research excellence."

During the 2015–16 academic year, Adler-Milstein was appointed to the Health IT Policy advisory committee to the Office of the National Coordinator for Health Information Technology. In this role, she would assist in making policy recommendations on the development and adoption of a nationwide health information infrastructure. She also received a 2015 Institute for Healthcare Policy and Innovation Impact Accelerator Awards for her research project "Coming down from the Tower of Babel," and the inaugural Seema S. Sonnad Emerging Leader in Managed Care Research Award.

Following this, Adler-Milstein was the recipient of a grant from the Centers for Medicare & Medicaid Services to study seamless care coordination of the Comprehensive End-Stage Renal Disease (ESRD) Care (CEC) Initiative. Using the grant, she would design and conduct an evaluation of the CEC Initiative using a combination of data from sources including claims, surveys, clinical quality measures, medical records, and market information. In the same month, she also earned the 2015 Early to Mid-Career Impact Accelerator Award "for her outstanding contributions to health policy and practice through her work on electronic health records and health information exchanges." Adler-Milstein later joined a government advisory committee examining ways to improve and further implement IT in the United Kingdom’s National Health Service. By May, she was promoted to associate professor with tenure.

=== University of California, San Francisco ===
Adler-Milstein left the University of Michigan in 2017 and accepted a position at the University of California, San Francisco. In her first year there, she was elected a Fellow of the American College of Medical Informatics and received the AcademyHealth's Alice S. Hersh New Investigator Award. The following year, she received the Don Eugene Detmer Award for Health Policy Contribution in Informatics from the American Medical Informatics Association "for her significant contributions to the field of informatics." In 2019, she was named a Member of the National Academy of Medicine.

In 2020, Adler-Milstein and Stephanie Rogers were awarded a $1 million grant from the John A. Hartford Foundation to study "the Implementation, Scaling, and Impact of the 4Ms in an IT-enabled Health System." She also led the first national hospital survey to measure the electronic health record adoptions of the Age-Friendly Health System 4Ms framework (What Matters, Medication, Mentation, and Mobility).
