= Jacquelynne Eccles =

American educational psychologist

Jacquelynne Sue Eccles
- Born: 1944 (age 81–82)
- Known for: Academic Motivation and Achievement, Gender and Ethnicity in STEM Fields
- Scientific career
- Fields: Developmental psychology, educational psychology, educational theory
- Workplaces: University of Michigan, University of California, Irvine

Jacquelynne Sue Eccles (born 1944) is an American educational psychologist. She is the Distinguished Professor of Education at the University of California, Irvine and formerly the McKeachie/Pintrich Distinguished University Professor of Psychology and Education at the University of Michigan. She was also a Senior Research Scientist and Director of the Gender and Achievement Research Program at the Institute for Social Research at the University of Michigan. She conducted research on family and school influences on student development, adolescence development, transitioning from childhood to adulthood, etc.

== Early Influence ==
While serving in the U.S. Air Force, Eccles' father brought his family with him on his many travels around the world. These trips inspired Eccles' interest in how individual and communal decision-making differs throughout global communities. First generation college student she forged her own path, volunteering through the Peace Core teaching math and science in Ghana.

== Career ==
Eccles holds a Ph.D. from University of California, Los Angeles. Her work has focused on topics related to social development, student motivation, and gender roles in education. Among her most noteworthy research contributions are the expectancy-value theory of motivation and the concept of stage-environment fit.

== Honors and awards ==
She received the Kurt Lewin Memorial Award in 1999, the James McKeen Cattell Fellow Award in 1996 and the E. L. Thorndike Award in 2005. She was awarded the APA Distinguished Scientific Award for the Applications of Psychology from the American Psychological Association in 2017.

== Selected publications ==
- Eccles, J. S., Midgley, C., Wigfield, A., Buchanan, C. M., Reuman, D., Flanagan, C., & Mac Iver, D. (1993). "Development during adolescence: The impact of stage-environment fit on young adolescents' experiences in schools and in families". American Psychologist, 48(2), 90.
- Eccles, J. S., & Barber, B. L. (1999). "Student council, volunteering, basketball, or marching band what kind of extracurricular involvement matters?". Journal of Adolescent Research, 14(1), 10–43.
- Wigfield, A., & Eccles, J. S. (2000). "Expectancy–value theory of achievement motivation". Contemporary Educational Psychology, 25(1), 68–81.
- Eccles, J. S., & Wigfield, A. (2002). "Motivational beliefs, values, and goals". Annual Review of Psychology, 53(1), 109–132.
