= Neal Schmitt =

American psychologist (born 1944)

- Born: 1944 (age 81–82)
- Education: Loras College; Purdue University
- Known for: Industrial and organizational psychology Personnel psychology
- Awards: James McKeen Cattell Fellow Award from the Association for Psychological Science (2014); Award for Distinguished Service to Psychological Science from the American Psychological Association (2015)
- Scientific career
- Fields: Psychology
- Institutions: Michigan State University
- Thesis: The effect of cue redundancy in multiple cue probability learning (1972)

Neal William Schmitt (born 1944) is an American psychologist specializing in personnel psychology and industrial and organizational psychology. He is a University Distinguished Professor in the Department of Psychology at Michigan State University, where he previously served as interim dean of the College of Social Science. He is a former editor-in-chief of the Journal of Applied Psychology.

In 2014, Schmitt received the James McKeen Cattell Fellow Award from the Association for Psychological Science. In 2015, he and Robert Sellers jointly received the Award for Distinguished Service to Psychological Science from the American Psychological Association.
