= Harry C. Triandis =

Greek–American psychologist (1926–2019)

Harry Charalambos Triandis (16 October 1926 – 1 June 2019) was Professor Emeritus at the Department of Psychology of the University of Illinois at Urbana–Champaign. He was considered a pioneer of cross-cultural psychology and his research focused on the cognitive aspects of attitudes, norms, roles and values in different cultures.

== Education and career ==
Triandis was born in Patras, Greece on 16 October 1926. During the Second World War, he learned four foreign languages and developed his curiosity about the differences that exist between cultures. As he met people across various European nations, it inspired him to research cultural disparities in the way people think. At age 20, he moved to Canada, where he graduated as an engineer at McGill University in 1951. Three years later, he obtained a master's degree in commerce from the University of Toronto. During that time, he was exposed to the work of psychology and pursued further education in that field. In 1958, he completed his doctoral education in Social Psychology at Cornell University in Ithaca, New York. He was Professor Emeritus at the Psychology Department of the University of Illinois at Urbana–Champaign until his death in 2019.

Triandis's early contributions to the field of cross-cultural psychology involved the development of several culture-sensitive measurements. He was president of several academic societies, includingthe International Association of Cross-Cultural Psychology (1976), the Interamerican Society of Psychology (1987–1989), the Association of Applied Psychology (1990–1994), and Division 8 and 9 of the American Psychological Association in 1977 and 1976, respectively. He was well known for his extensive research on individualism and collectivism. He died in Carlsbad, California on 1 June 2019 at age 92.

== Awards and honors ==
- Interamerican Psychology Award, Interamerican Society of Psychology (1981)
- Honorary Fellow, International Association of Cross-Cultural Psychology (1982)
- Distinguished Fulbright Professor to India (1983)
- Centennial Citation, American Psychological Association (1992)
- Otto Klineberg Award, Society for the Psychological Study of Social Issues (1994)
- Award for Distinguished Lecturer of the Year, American Psychological Association (1994)
- Award for Distinguished Contributions to International Psychology, American Psychological Association (1994)
- James McKeen Cattell Fellow Award, American Psychological Society (1996)
- Award for Outstanding International Psychologist, American Psychological Association (2002)
- Lifetime Contributions Award, International Academy for Intercultural Research (2004)
- Career Contribution Award, Society of Personality and Social Psychology (2011)

== Publications ==
- Attitude and Attitude Change, ISBN 978-0471888314
- Analysis of Subjective Culture: An Approach to Cross-cultural Social Psychology, 1971. ISBN 978-0471889052
- Variations in Black and White Perceptions of the Social Environment, 1972. ISBN 978-0252005152
- Interpersonal Behavior, 1976. ISBN 978-0818501883
- Culture and Social Behavior, 1977. ISBN 978-0070651104
- Individualism And Collectivism (New Directions in Social Psychology), 1995. ISBN 978-0813318509
