= Wallace Lambert =

Canadian psychologist (1922–2009)

Wallace ("Wally") Earl Lambert
- Born: December 31, 1922; Amherst, Nova Scotia, Canada
- Died: August 23, 2009 (aged 86); Montreal, Quebec, Canada
- Education: Brown University, Colgate University, University of North Carolina at Chapel Hill
- Scientific career
- Fields: Psychology
- Workplaces: McGill University
- Thesis: An exploratory study of the developmental aspects of second-language acquisition

Wallace Earl Lambert (December 31, 1922 – August 23, 2009) was a Canadian psychologist and a professor in the psychology department at McGill University (1954–1990). Among the founders of psycholinguistics and sociolinguistics, he is known for his contributions to social and cross-cultural psychology (intergroup attitudes, child-rearing values, and psychological consequences of living in multicultural societies), language education (the French immersion program), and bilingualism (measurement of language dominance, attitudes and motivation in second-language learning, and social, cognitive, and neuropsychological consequences of bilingualism).

== Biography ==
Wallace "Wally" Lambert was born in Amherst, Nova Scotia, Canada, on December 31, 1922. When he was 4 years old, his family moved to Taunton, Massachusetts, where he was raised. Lambert received his undergraduate education at Brown University (1940–1947), where his studies were interrupted for 3 years of U.S. military service in the European Theatre of Operations. While on release from the army, he studied psychology, philosophy, and economics at Cambridge University, and French language and literature at the University of Paris and the Aix-Marseille University. Lambert received his master's degree in psychology from Colgate University in 1950, and his doctorate in 1953 from the University of North Carolina at Chapel Hill.

In 1954, Lambert took up a position in the Psychology Department at McGill University in Montreal, where he published nearly 200 journal articles, monographs, and books on the topic of bilingualism. Among Lambert's former graduate students are: Allan Paivio, Robert C. Gardner, Leon Jakobovits, Malcolm Preston, Moshe Anisfeld, Elizabeth Peal Anisfeld, G. Richard Tucker, Josiane Hamers, Allan Reynolds, Gary Cziko, and Jyotsna Vaid. Lambert remained at McGill University as an emeritus professor from 1990 until his death in 2009. Over the course of his career, Lambert further served as an editor for five academic journals, and as a consultant for the United States Office of Education.

== Research ==
In 1960, Lambert and colleagues published the article Evaluational Reactions to Spoken Languages, which describes a study in which the authors investigated the effect of language on people's perception of other cultural groups. The authors showed that socioeconomic disparities between cultural groups were reflected even in how people reacted to recorded voices. Led by Lambert, the researchers examined the reactions of Francophone and Anglophone participants as they listened to recordings of who they thought were monolingual French and English speakers. In fact, the speakers were bilingual individuals—fluent in French and English. The speakers were recorded in both French and English to ensure reliability. Once the listening procedure was over, the participants were asked to fill in an attitudinal questionnaire intended to assess feelings toward members of the other community. This technique was developed by Lambert and termed the Matched-guise test, an experimental procedure meant to assess attitudes and identify stereotypes held toward the out-group. Lambert and his colleagues believed that upon hearing recordings of voices speaking in the listener's native language, both French-speaking Quebecers as well as English-speaking Quebecers would judge the speakers as having more social and economic success than speakers recorded in the listener's non-native language. For example, they believed that a Francophone subject would think more positively of a French speaker than of an English speaker. This was found to be true for English subjects; however, it was not true for French subjects. French subjects rated English voices more favourably than French voices. The researchers attributed these results to the higher socioeconomic situation understood to be experienced by most Anglophones in comparison to Francophones in Montreal at that time. This study emphasized the links between stereotypes and language embedded in Quebec's culture.

In 1962, Lambert and Peal published an article entitled The Relation of Bilingualism to Intelligence, describing a study in which Lambert and Peal examined whether bilingualism was associated with impaired performance in nonverbal and verbal intelligence tests. Previous research suggested, but did not clearly demonstrate, a relationship between bilingualism and decreased cognitive performance. Lambert and Peal aimed to resolve the issue of whether bilingualism was associated with impaired cognitive performance by addressing some of the methodological problems inherent in previous studies, operationalizing bilingualism as the ability to speak two languages fluently, and controlling for socioeconomic status as well as other potential confounding factors (e.g., gender, age, etc.). The findings of this study showed that, contrary to the dominant view at the time, bilingual people outperformed monolinguals on nonverbal and verbal intelligence tests. These findings changed Canadians' views on bilingualism and led to Canadian parents becoming less reticent about having their children learn two languages (e.g., French and English).

In 1965, a group of parents, concerned that their children were growing up as English monolinguals in a predominantly French-speaking Quebec, wanted to implement French immersion programs in their community of St. Lambert, Quebec. These parents sought help from bilingualism experts such as Lambert and Richard Tucker to implement these programs. To address the concerns of these parents, Lambert and Tucker designed an experiment in which there were two groups of English-speaking children. One group attended increasing numbers of classes (subjects) taught in French, with the remaining classes taught in English, while the other group received instruction solely in the traditional English. Lambert and Tucker's objective was to determine whether learning French would be beneficial for English-speaking children in Quebec's social and political context. They also sought to evaluate the consequences of learning a second language on academic performance in general. After the fourth year of instruction in their respective groups, the children were compared in terms of their attitudes toward the Francophone community, as well as their academic scores. Results showed that the French immersion group performed as well as the English control group in all academic subjects, while mastering a second language. In a follow-up evaluation, the researchers found that those who had acquired French as a second language had more favourable attitudes toward the French community compared to those in the control groups. The implications of this study led to the successful implementation of many language immersion programs in Canada and around the world.

== Honours and awards ==
List:

- Fellow at the Center for Advanced Study in the Behavioral Sciences at Stanford University (1964–1965)
- Fellow of the Royal Society of Canada (1973)
- Fellow of the National Academy of Education (1976)
- Queen Elizabeth II Golden Jubilee Medal (1978)
- Honorary President of the Canadian Psychological Association (1982–1983)
- Distinguished Alumni Award from the University of North Carolina (1983)
- Canadian Psychological Association Award for Distinguished Contribution to Psychology (1984)
- American Psychological Association Distinguished Scientific Award for the Applications of Psychology (1990)
- James McKeen Cattell Fellow Award of the Association for Psychological Science (1992)
- Visiting Fellow, Netherlands Institute for Advanced Study
- Wassenaar (1987), and five honorary doctorates.

== Personal life ==
Lambert met his future wife Janine in France after the second world war. They had two children, Philippe and Sylvie. Watching his children grow up to be fluently bilingual in a household in Montreal with an English-speaking father and a French-speaking mother is said to have sparked his interest in bilingualism-biculturalism.

== Publications ==
- Language, Psychology and Culture. Essays b Wallace E. Lambert. Stanford University Press. 1 January 1972. ASIN B0028LSIIA.
- Coping with Cultural and Racial Diversity in Urban America. Praeger. 8 February 1990. ISBN 978-0275931742.
- Child rearing values: A cross-national study. Praeger. 1 January 1979. ISBN 978-0030490866.
- Tu, vous, usted: A social-psychological study of address patterns. Mewbury house. 1 January 1976. ISBN 978-0883770603.
