= Nancy Adler =

American psychologist (1946–2024)

- Born: July 26, 1946; New York City, U.S.
- Died: January 4, 2024 (aged 77); San Francisco, California, U.S.
- Education: Wellesley College; Harvard University
- Known for: Health behavior Social determinants of health
- Spouse: Arnold Milstein
- Children: two including Julia Adler-Milstein
- Awards: New York Academy of Medicine's Academy Medal for Distinguished Contributions in Biomedical Science (2017); APS James McKeen Cattell Fellow Award (2013); APA Newman-Proshansky Prize for Lifetime Achievement in Population Psychology (2011); NAM David Rall Medal (2010); APA Distinguished Scientific Award for the Applications of Psychology (2009)
- Scientific career
- Fields: Health psychology
- Institutions: University of California, Santa Cruz; University of California, San Francisco
- Thesis: Reactions of women to therapeutic abortion: a social psychological analysis (1974)

Nancy Elinor Adler (July 26, 1946 – January 4, 2024) was an American health psychologist. She was the Lisa and John Pritzker Professor of Medical Psychology at the University of California, San Francisco (UCSF), and director of UCSF's Center for Health and Community Sciences. Adler was known for her research on health behaviors, health disparities, and social determinants of health.

Adler was the director of the MacArthur Foundation's Research Network on Socioeconomic Status and Health from its foundation to December 1996. She was the director of the Evidence for Action (E4A), a UCSF health program funded by the Robert Wood Johnson Foundation.

== Biography ==
Adler was born in Manhattan on July 26, 1946. Her father was a salesman and clothing manufacturer and her mother was a teacher. The family later moved to Denver.

Adler completed her undergraduate studies at Wellesley College, where she conducted research with Claire Zimmerman. She entered the PhD Program in Social Relations at Harvard University in 1968 and was mentored by Herbert Kelman, an expert on social influence and cognitive dissonance. For her 1974 PhD thesis titled "Reactions of Women to Therapeutic Abortion: A Social Psychological Analysis" Adler interviewed women before and after having a therapeutic abortion (a pregnancy termination for medical reasons such as fetal abnormalities, as opposed to one for non-medical reasons such as financial worries). She found that women's reactions were generally positive and reflective of healthy coping strategies.

Adler taught at the University of California, Santa Cruz prior to joining the faculty of UCSF. In 1980, she served a term as the President of Society for Environmental, Population, and Conservation Psychology (APA Division 34). Adler has chaired multiple NAM committees and workshops on subjects including the Deepwater Horizon oil spill, sexually transmitted diseases, psychosocial treatments for cancer patients, and women's health.

== Research ==
Adler was best known for her research demonstrating that people with more education and higher incomes, as well as a belief that they have higher social status than others, are healthier and live longer than less privileged people.

== Honors and awards ==
Adler was a fellow of the American Psychological Society (APS) and the American Psychological Association (APA), as well as a member of the American Academy of Arts and Sciences and the National Academy of Medicine (NAM).

Adler received the APA Distinguished Scientific Award for the Applications of Psychology in 2009. The award cited her "research on reproductive health examining adolescent decision-making with regard to contraception, conscious and preconscious motivations for pregnancy, and perception of risk for sexually transmitted diseases, and for her groundbreaking insights into the importance of psychological processes in explaining why socioeconomic status is associated with physical health." Other awards include:

- J. Michael McGinnis Leadership Excellence Award from the Interdisciplinary Association for Population Health Science (2020)
- New York Academy of Medicine's Academy Medal for Distinguished Contributions in Biomedical Science (2017)
- APS James McKeen Cattell Fellow Award (2013)
- APA Newman-Proshansky Prize for Lifetime Achievement in Population Psychology (2011)
- NAM David Rall Medal (2010)

== Personal life ==
In 1975, Adler married Arnold Milstein. They collaborated on research and had two daughters, Julia and Sarah, together. Julia Adler-Milstein is a professor of medicine at University of California, San Francisco. Sarah Adler-Milstein is an advocate for workers' rights and has served as Field Director for Latin America and the Caribbean for the Worker Rights Consortium.

Adler died of pancreatic cancer on January 4, 2024, at age 77.

== Selected works ==
- Adler, N. E., Boyce, T., Chesney, M. A., Cohen, S., Folkman, S., Kahn, R. L., & Syme, S. L. (1994). Socioeconomic status and health: the challenge of the gradient. American Psychologist, 49(1), 15–24.
- Adler, N. E., Epel, E. S., Castellazzo, G., & Ickovics, J. R. (2000). Relationship of subjective and objective social status with psychological and physiological functioning: Preliminary data in healthy, White women. Health Psychology, 19(6), 586–592.
- Adler, N. E., & Newman, K. (2002). Socioeconomic disparities in health: pathways and policies. Health Affairs, 21(2), 60–76.
- Adler, N. E., & Ostrove, J. M. (1999). Socioeconomic status and health: what we know and what we don't. Annals of the New York Academy of Sciences, 896(1), 3–15.
- Adler, N. E., & Snibbe, A. C. (2003). The role of psychosocial processes in explaining the gradient between socioeconomic status and health. Current Directions in Psychological Science, 12(4), 119–123.
- Adler, N. J., Den Hartog, D. N., & Knippenberg, D. V. (2008). Introduction to special topic forum: Current research on mergers and acquisitions: Stakes, outcomes, and integration. Journal of Management, 34(3), 469–478.
