= Edwin A. Fleishman =

American psychologist (1927–2021)

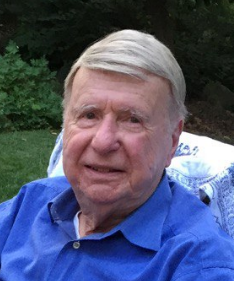
- Born: March 10, 1927; New York, New York, U.S.
- Died: February 17, 2021 (aged 93); Silver Spring, Maryland, U.S.
- Education: Loyola College (BS); University of Maryland, College Park (MS); Ohio State University (PhD)
- Known for: Research about industrial and organizational psychology
- Spouse: Pauline Fleishman
- Scientific career
- Fields: Industrial and organizational psychology
- Workplaces: United States Air Force; American Institutes for Research; Yale University; George Mason University; University of California, Irvine
- Thesis: The relationship between "leadership climate" and supervisory behavior (1951)
- Doctoral advisor: Harold E. Burtt

Edwin A. Fleishman (March 10, 1927 – February 17, 2021) was an American psychologist best known for his work in the field of industrial and organizational psychology. Among his notable achievements was a taxonomy for describing individual differences in perceptual-motor performance. The Fleishman Job Analysis Survey (F-JAS) that he developed under Management Research Institute has been cited 100 times since 1995. Additionally, Fleishman is the author of more than 250 research articles and journals.

== Early life and education ==
Fleishman was born in New York City and his family moved to Baltimore when he was 2 years old. He attended primary and secondary school in Baltimore. He later attended Loyola College in Baltimore under a scholarship where he studied chemistry and received a B.S. with honors in just two years, graduating at the age of 18.

Right upon graduating in 1945, Fleishman enlisted in the U.S. Navy under an electronics program. Displaying a greater interest in psychology during his time in the Navy, he joined the Department of Psychology at University of Maryland and earned his M.A. in 1949. The same year, he married Pauline Utman, who was an undergraduate in the same department at Maryland at the time.

Starting in 1949, Fleishman worked at the Army Personnel Research Office in the Pentagon for several months where he developed achievement tests for various occupations. That same year, he started working with a Baltimore brewery on developing a method to evaluate beer preferences, which resulted in his first publication in the Journal of Applied Psychology.

== Career ==
He earned his doctorate in applied psychology in 1951 from Ohio State University under Harold E. Burtt, then took a position with the United States Air Force in the Perceptual-Motor Research Laboratory. In 1957, Fleishman started working at Yale University under the Department of Psychology and the Department of Industrial Administration. At Yale, he started and ran the Human Skills Research Laboratory and taught graduate and undergraduate courses in psychological measurement, organizational psychology, and human performance. It was at Yale he returned to studying organizational psychology and piloted a number of studies on productivity, leader-subordinate relationships, job selection and training, and prediction of performance.

From 1963 to 1975, Fleishman left Yale to work with the American Institute for Research in the Behavioral Sciences (AIR), serving as senior vice-president and director of the Washington office, where he expanded on his research in the area of human performance. It was at this time in 1974, where he was elected president of the International Association of Applied Psychology, a position he held for 8 years.

After his time in AIR, Fleishman worked as a visiting professor in the School of Administration of the University of California, Irvine from 1975 to 1976, where he continued research on the categorization of human tasks and predictions about human performance. In 1976, Fleishman returned to Washington as founding president of Advanced Research Resources Organization (ARRO) to continue his previous work.

In 1986, Fleishman started working at George Mason University as Distinguished University Professor of Psychology and faculty member in the Psychology Department. Here, he founded the first Center for Behavioral and Cognitive Studies, which was recognized by GMU with an Award of Excellence.

He is the author of several books and was the Editor of the Journal of Applied Psychology and the recipient of APA's Distinguished Scientific Award for the Applications of Psychology in 1980.

In 1998 and 1999, he was awarded the APA Award for Distinguished Contributions to the International Advancement of Psychology.

He was also a former president of the International Association of Applied Psychology (IAAP), the American Psychological Association's (APA) Divisions of Industrial and Organizational Psychology, Evaluation and Measurement, and its Society of Engineering Psychologists, as well as the Society for Industrial and Organizational Psychology (SIOP).

== Recognition ==
- Guggenheim Fellowship and a Senior Faculty Fellowship from Yale (1962)
- Franklin V. Taylor Award from APA's Division 21 (1974)
- APA's Distinguished Scientific Award for Applications of Psychology (1980)
- Honorary Doctor of Science degree from the University of Edinburgh (1982)
- Society for Industrial and Organizational Psychology, Inc. (APA Division 14) Distinguished Professional Practice Award (1983)
- James McKeen Cattell Award from the American Psychological Society (1992)
- M. Scott Myers Award for Applied Research in the Workplace (1998)
- APA's Award for Distinguished Contributions to the International Advancement of Psychology (1998/1999)

== Selected publications ==
Fleishman, Edwin A. (1951). An experimental consumer panel technique. Journal of Applied Psychology

Fleishman, Edwin A. (1964). The structure and measurement of physical fitness. Englewood Cliffs, NJ: Prentice Hall.

Fleishman, Edwin A.; Quaintance, M. K. (1984). Taxonomies of human performance: The description of human tasks. New York, NY: Academic Press.

Fleishman, Edwin A.; Reilly, M. E. (1992). Handbook of human abilities: Definitions, measurements, and job task requirements. Bethesda, MD: Management Research Institute.

Fleishman, Edwin A.; Reilly, M. E. (1995). Fleishman job analysis survey (F-JAS). Bethesda, MD: Management Research Institute.
