= Matched-guise test =

Sociolinguistic experimental technique

The matched-guise test is a sociolinguistic experimental technique used to determine the true feelings of an individual or community towards a specific language, dialect, or accent. In this technique, human subjects listen to recordings of speakers of two or more language varieties and make judgments about various traits of those speakers, such as body height, good looks, leadership, sense of humor, intelligence, religiousness, self-confidence, dependability, kindness, ambition, sociability, character, and likability (Stefanowitsch 2005). The subjects believe they are hearing different speakers, not realizing that they are actually listening to a single speaker, a bilingual or polyglot, who is secretly performing two or more voices or linguistic personas, known as "guises". Therefore, the subjects end up eliciting their attitudes on different speech varieties as being used (without the subjects' knowledge) by a single speaker.

This experiment was first introduced by Wallace Lambert and his colleagues at McGill University in 1960s to determine attitudes held by bilingual French Canadians towards English and French (Davies & Elder 2004:189, Agheyisi & Fishman, 1970). Since the initial aim of these studies range from the influence of linguistic attitudes on educational and political systems to their influence on workplace environments, Lambert's technique has proven successful in identifying and eliciting certain stereotypes toward particular social groups. The matched-guise technique has been widely used in bicultural settings such as in Quebec, as well as in cross-cultural studies and multi-ethnic societies, and it has been employed not only as an instrument in comparing attitudes toward languages, but also toward variations in dialects and accents. And depending on particular listener, a speaker's accent, speech patterns, vocabulary, intonation, etc., can all serve as markers for evaluating speaker's appearance, personality, social status, and character. Among other things, listeners also possess language attitudes, which they use to evaluate the speakers whom they are hearing.

== Origins ==
The matched-guise technique was developed and pioneered by Lambert et al. (1960) to evaluate the reactions of Montreal residents towards both French-speakers and English-speakers. Lambert continued to implement the matched-guise technique to further studies, including an investigation on how people evaluated English speakers with and without a Jewish accent (Anisfeld 1962), moving beyond the technique's original purpose of evaluating attitudes to different languages.

The same technique has been applied to English-speakers in the United Kingdom. In an investigation into assessing people's varying reactions to London and Yorkshire accents (Strongman and Woosley 1967), the judges of the various guises were all students and were split equally into a “southern” and a “northern” group. The results, however, did not show much variation in the judges' attitudes towards the accents.

The matched-guise test has since been used on many other countries for a range of other languages and dialects.

== Procedure ==
- i) the variables of 'sex'; 'age'; 'first language (L1)', 'variety used in domestic relationships', etc. of the 'judges' evaluating the recorded 'voices' are taken into consideration;
- ii) the variables of 'sex', 'age', 'voice' and 'linguistic variety' of the individuals recorded are taken into consideration.
- iii) the stimulus material spoken in the linguistic variety that is recorded is studied from a strictly linguistic approach (phonetic, morphological, syntactic and lexical aspects) and from a stylistic point of view (formal, informal register...).
- iv) the interviewees have no information about the 'voices'; that is, they do not know that the 'voices' speaking at least two different linguistic varieties are the same person and that these are guises; this is where the technique gets its name: matched guise.
- v) there is total control over the variable 'voice', with the removal of all features of speed, volume, timbre, tone, etc. Nonetheless, the importance of this technique lies in manipulating the linguistic features of the oral stimulus material, rather than in manipulating the recorded voices.
- vi) the length of the oral stimulus material recording is two minutes;
- vii) the 'judges' or interviewees are asked to evaluate the personal qualities of the recorded individuals on the basis of their 'voices', as if they were evaluating the 'voice' of somebody they did not know during a telephone conversation.
- viii) a questionnaire allows the personality traits of the 'voices' evaluated to be attributed to the 'voices' (intelligence; leadership; physical attractiveness; social status, unpleasantness...).

== Criticisms ==
=== Limitations ===
It is typical in matched-guise tests for one of the recordings to be of a speaker using his or her 'natural' dialect, and another of the same speaker 'performing' another dialect. To assume that the two are commensurable is methodologically naive. In addition, in certain scenarios it may be impossible for the passages to be spoken by the individual due to the likelihood that the listener recognizes speakers as one and the same. To avoid this many studies have used different speakers to read the passage. This is problematic as it is difficult to control for differences between the speakers, such as speed or intonation (Tsalikis et al. 1991). Another method is to split up the listeners into two groups and have each group listen to only a single guise, in which case it becomes necessary to include identical filler material to see if the two groups rate identical passages similarly (Stefanowitsch 2005).

=== (Non-)existent stereotypes ===
Gardner and Lambert (1972) point out some of the limitations of his method:

- i) There is some uncertainty whether the attitude measurements that emerge are really what interviewees believe or what they think they should express in public about their opinions;
- ii) There is a possibility the recording encourages the use of stereotypes, which produces other associations reflected in the data obtained.

=== The experimental nature of the technique ===
Another aspect of this technique with negative connotations are its experimental features: the matched guise technique is usually used with groups in classrooms or laboratories and has thus been qualified as artificial or not very 'natural'; Robinson (1978) also believes that experimental situations, by their nature, force individuals to provide an answer. Moreover, the use of oral stimulus material created for the experiment has increased skepticism about obtaining significant results with this technique (Tajfel, 1962; Lee, 1971; Robinson, 1972). Lee (1971) even suggests that repeating the message can mean that 'judges' focus on the linguistic features of the varieties used more than they would in a normal and unconditioned situation.

=== The monostylistic presupposition of the varieties used ===
Moreover, this technique presupposes that the linguistic varieties evaluated have only one functional style (Agheyisi & Fishman, 1970). Thus, it is unable to explain the social meaning of speakers' multistylistic capacity in different contexts or degrees of knowledge of the linguistic varieties evaluated. However, efforts have been made to improve the matched-guise test to cater for this (Howard & Bourhis 1976).

== See also ==
- Diglossia
- Linguistics
- Sociolinguistics

== Bibliography ==
- Agheyisi, R., & Fishman, J. A. (1970). Language attitude studies: A brief survey of methodological approaches. Anthropological Linguistics, 12(5), 137–157.
- Anisfeld, M., Bogo, N., & Lambert, W. E. (1962). Evaluational reactions to accented English speech. The Journal of Abnormal and Social Psychology, 65(4), 223–231. https://doi.org/10.1037/h0045060
- Davies, A., & Elder, C. (Eds.). (2004). The handbook of applied linguistics. Malden, MA: Blackwell.
- Downes, W. (1998). Language and society (2nd ed.). Cambridge, United Kingdom: Cambridge University Press.
- Gardner, R. G., & Lambert, W. E. (1972). Attitudes and motivation in a second-language learning. Rowley, MA: Newbury House.
- Lee, R. R. (1971). Dialect perception: A critical review and re-evaluation. Quarterly Journal of Speech, 57(4), 410–417.
- Robinson, W. P. (1978). Lenguaje y conducta social. Mexico: Trillas.
- Stefanowitsch, A. (2005). Empirical methods in linguistics: The matched guise technique.
- Tajfel, H. (1972). Experiments in a vacuum. In J. Israel & H. Tajfel (Eds.), The context of social psychology: A critical assessment (pp. 69–119). London, United Kingdom: Academic Press.
- Tsalikis, J., DeShields, O. W., Jr., & LaTour, M. S. (1991). The role of accent on the credibility and effectiveness of the international business person: The case of Guatemala. The Journal of Personal Selling & Sales Management, 11(1), 31–41.
- Wardhaugh, R. (1992). An introduction to linguistics (2nd ed.). Oxford, United Kingdom: Blackwell.
