= Shape coding =

Shape coding is a method of design of a control that allows the control's function to be signified by the shape of the control. It was used successfully by Alphonse Chapanis on airplane controls to improve aviation safety.
