= Michelle Craske =

Australian psychologist (born 1959)

Michelle G. Craske AO
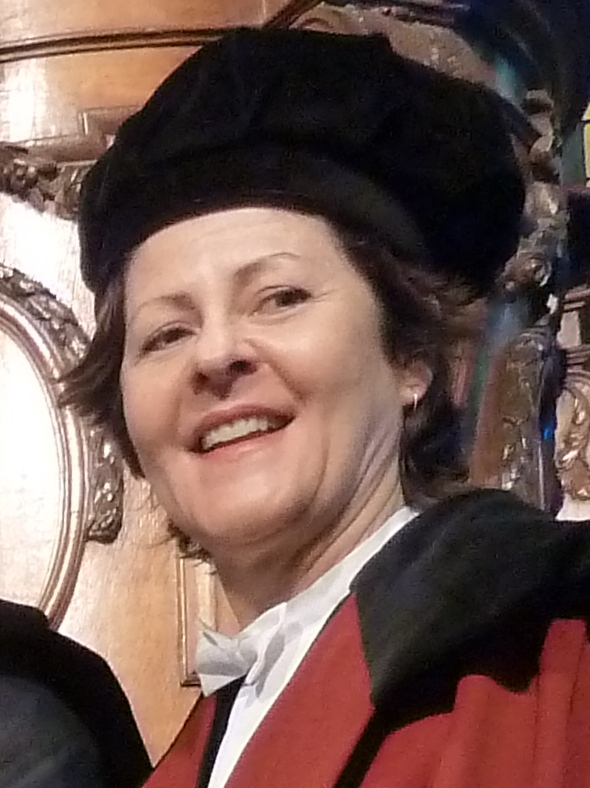
- Born: Tasmania, Australia
- Education: University of Tasmania; University of British Columbia
- Occupations: Professor of Psychology, Psychiatry and Biobehavioral Sciences, University of California, Los Angeles

Michelle G. Craske AO (born 1959) is an Australian academic who is currently serving as Professor of Psychology, Psychiatry, and Behavioral Sciences, Miller Endowed Chair, Director of the Anxiety and Depression Research Center, and Associate Director of the Staglin Family Music Center for Behavioral and Brain Health at the University of California, Los Angeles. She is known for her research on anxiety disorders, including phobia and panic disorder, and the use of fear extinction through exposure therapy as treatment. Other research focuses on anxiety and depression in childhood and adolescence and the use of cognitive behavioral therapy as treatment. Craske has served as President of the Association for Behavioral and Cognitive Therapy. She was a member of the DSM-IV work group on Anxiety Disorders and the DSM-5 work group on Anxiety, Obsessive Compulsive Spectrum, Posttraumatic, and Dissociative Disorders, while chairing the sub-work group on Anxiety Disorders. She is the Editor-in-chief of Behaviour Research and Therapy.

In 2015, Craske received an honorary doctorate from Maastricht University for her work in clinical psychology and experimental psychopathology. In 2017, she received the Distinguished Scientist Award from the Society for a Science of Clinical Psychology (SSCP), an award given annually to "an individual who has made an extremely important career contribution to the science of clinical psychology."

== Biography ==
Craske was born in Tasmania, Australia. She received her B.A. with honors at the University of Tasmania (1981). She went on to receive her M.A. (1983) and her Ph.D. (1985) from the University of British Columbia in Clinical Psychology, where she worked alongside Stanley (Jack) Rachman. Craske completed a postdoctoral fellowship in SUNY Albany under the guidance of David Barlow. In 1990, Craske joined the faculty of UCLA where she has remained throughout her career. Her research on treatments for anxiety disorders and depression has been supported through grants from the National Institute of Mental Health.

== Research ==
Craske's research views fear and anxiety as separable constructs and explores how anxiety can stem from fear and be treated through fear extinction. One of her main goals has been to find effective treatments for anxiety, including methods of reducing panic attacks. Craske has develop a series of a computer-assisted therapy programs for treating anxiety disorders that are designed to help therapists and their clients.

Craske's and her colleagues have focused on emotion regulation in clients, using focused breathing to promote mindfulness. They found that participants who practiced focused breathing responded less negatively to aversive stimuli whereas participants who practiced unfocused breathing reported more distress. This result suggests that focused breathing may be used in therapeutic contexts to help clients respond less strongly to negative stimuli. One of her most cited studies involved a two-year follow-up of patients who received behavioral treatment for panic disorder. Treatment included progressive muscle relaxation, interoceptive exposure therapy with cognitive restructuring, or a combination of both. The results showed that 81% of the patients remained panic free after the 2 year assessment.

Craske is the author of several academic texts including Anxiety Disorders: Psychological Approaches to Theory and Treatment (1999), The Origins of Phobias and Anxiety Disorders: Why More Women than Men (2003), and Cognitive Behavior Therapy (2009). With David Barlow and others, she has authored numerous trade books for clinical practice, such as Mastery of Your Panic and Anxiety, Mastery of Your Fears and Phobias, and Mastery of Your Anxiety and Worry, workbooks for clients and guides for therapists. She published over 460 peer reviewed journal articles in the field of fear, anxiety and depression.

== Representative Publications ==
- Arch, J. J., & Craske, M. G. (2006). Mechanisms of mindfulness: Emotion regulation following a focused breathing induction. Behaviour Research and Therapy, 44(12), 1849-1858.
- Arch, J. J., & Craske, M. G. (2008). Acceptance and commitment therapy and cognitive behavioral therapy for anxiety disorders: Different treatments, similar mechanisms? Clinical Psychology: Science and Practice, 15(4), 263-279.
- Andrews, G., Cuijpers, P., Craske, M. G., McEvoy, P., & Titov, N. (2010). Computer therapy for the anxiety and depressive disorders is effective, acceptable and practical health care: a meta-analysis. PLOS One, 5(10), e13196.
- Barlow, D. H., Craske, M. G., Cerny, J. A., & Klosko, J. S. (1989). Behavioral treatment of panic disorder. Behavior Therapy, 20(2), 261-282.
- Craske, M. G., Brown, T. A., & Barlow, D. H. (1991). Behavioral treatment of panic disorder: A two-year follow-up. Behavior Therapy, 22(3), 289-304.
- Craske, M. G., Kircanski, K., Zelikowsky, M., Mystkowski, J., Chowdhury, N., & Baker, A. (2008). Optimizing inhibitory learning during exposure therapy. Behaviour Research and Therapy, 46(1), 5-27.

== Honours ==
In June 2022, Craske was appointed Officer of the Order of Australia in the 2022 Queen's Birthday Honours for "distinguished service to psychology, particularly the study of anxiety and depression, and to tertiary education".

== Personal ==
Craske married actor Robert Ginty in 2003, they remained together until Ginty's death in 2009.
