= Howard Friedman (psychologist) =

American psychologist

- Education: Yale University; Harvard University
- Occupation: Psychologist

Howard Friedman is an American psychologist. He was a distinguished professor in the department of psychology at the University of California, Riverside.

In 1999, Friedman was named a fellow of the American Association for the Advancement of Science.
