= Frank L. Schmidt =

American psychologist (1944–2021)

- Born: April 29, 1944; Louisville, Kentucky, U.S.
- Died: August 21, 2021 (aged 77)
- Education: Bellarmine College (BA); Purdue University (MS, PhD)
- Known for: intelligence, personality, Industrial and organizational psychology, Meta-analysis
- Scientific career
- Fields: Psychology
- Workplaces: University of Iowa

Frank L. Schmidt (April 29, 1944 – August 21, 2021) was an American psychology professor at the University of Iowa known for his work in personnel selection and employment testing. Schmidt was a researcher in the area of industrial and organizational psychology with the most number of publications in the two major journals in the 1980s. In the 1990s he was the 4th most published researcher in Journal of Applied Psychology (JAP) and Personnel Psychology (PP), the two principal publications in the field of industrial-organizational psychology. He was also winner of the first Dunnette Prize, the most prestigious lifetime achievement award given by the Society for Industrial and Organizational Psychology "to honor living individuals whose work has significantly expanded knowledge of the causal significance of individual differences through advanced research, development, and/or application".

Together with John Hunter he was well known for his research on the development and application of validity generalization methods. These methods estimate the predictive validity of employment tests. This research has demonstrated that these validities generalize across organizations and job settings. Schmidt also developed psychometric meta-analysis methods used in a wide variety of research areas. He also testified as an expert witness specializing in employment selection.

== Career ==
Schmidt earned his BA in Psychology from Bellarmine College in 1966, then attended Purdue University to study industrial psychology, earning an M.S. in 1968 and a PhD in 1970. From 1970 to 1973 he was assistant professor of Industrial Psychology, Michigan State University, earning tenure and serving as an associate professor until 1974. He was research professor of Industrial Psychology at George Washington University from spring 1976 to fall 1985. During that time he was visiting professor, Australian Graduate School of Management, Sydney, Australia, in 1982. Schmidt was the Gary C. Fethke Chair in Leadership emeritus, Department of Management and Organizations in the Tippie College of Business at the University of Iowa, where he has taught since 1985.

He authored a textbook on meta-analysis with John E. Hunter titled Methods of Meta-Analysis: Correcting Error and Bias in Research Findings.

In 1994 he was one of 52 signatories on "Mainstream Science on Intelligence," an editorial written by Linda Gottfredson and published in the Wall Street Journal.

== Awards and recognition ==
- Elected Fellow of APA and Division 14, 1979; Fellow Div. 5, 1983.
- Elected President of Division 5 of the American Psychological Association. Division of Evaluation, Measurement and Statistics. Term: 1993–1994.
- Distinguished Scientific Contributions Award (with John Hunter) from the American Psychological Association, 1995.
- Distinguished Scientific Contributions Award (with John Hunter) from the Society for Industrial and Organizational Psychology, 1995.
- Heneman Distinguished Career Award for Research Contributions to Human Resources. Academy of Management, Human Resources Division, 1995.
- Distinguished Career Achievement Award for Contributions to Research Methods, Academy of Management, Research Methods Division, 2002.
- Outstanding Publication in Organizational Behavior for 2002. Awarded by Academy of Management, Organizational Behavior Division, 2003.
- Co-recipient (along with Marc Orlitzky and Sara Rynes) of the 2004 Moskowitz Prize for the best quantitative study on investment and social responsibility. (This is an award in the area of Finance.)
- Recipient of the Michael Losey Human Resource Award, 2005. From the Society for Human Resource Management (SHRM). $50,000 Award.
- Recipient of the Career Achievement Award, 2006. From the Association of Test Publishers (ATP).
- Recipient of James McKeen Cattell Award for Scientific Contributions to Applied Psychology. 2007. From the Association for Psychological Science.

He has served on the editorial boards of

- Psychological Methods (2004 to present)
- Journal of Applied Psychology (1974–2002)
- Human Resource Management Review (6/91 to present)
- Quantitative Series in the Social Sciences (Sage), (1994 to present)
- International Journal of Selection and Assessment (2001 to present)
- Organizational Behavior and Human Performance (8/74 to 4/84)
- Academy of Management Journal (9/75 to 4/77)
- Journal of Industrial and Organizational Psychology (1973–1975)

Students have included Ken Pearlman, Mike A. McDaniel (Virginia Commonwealth University), Ken Law (Chinese University of Hong Kong), Deniz Ones (University of Minnesota), Vish Viswesvaran (Florida International University), Kevin Carlson (Virginia Tech), Huy Le (University of Nevada-Las Vegas), In-Sue Oh (Temple University), Jonathan Shaffer (West Texas A&M University) and Ben Postlethwaite (Pepperdine University).

== Selected bibliography ==
He (co) authored about 200 research papers in journals and presented at the academic conferences about 300 times. His work has been cited more than 66,000 times as of 2020.

- Schmidt, FL, & Hunter, JE. Development of a general solution to the problem of validity generalization. Journal of Applied Psychology, 1977
- Hunter, John E; Schmidt, Frank L (1990), Methods of Meta-Analysis: Correcting Error and Bias in Research Findings, Newbury Park, California; London; New Delhi: SAGE Publications
- Schmidt, FL Statistical significance testing and cumulative knowledge in psychology: Implications for training. Psychological Methods, 1996.
- Schmidt, FL., Oh, I.-S., & Hayes, T. Fixed versus random effects models in meta-analysis: Model properties and an empirical comparison of differences in results. British Journal of Mathematical and Statistical Psychology, 2009.
