= Janet Shibley Hyde =

American psychologist

- Education: Oberlin College; University of California, Berkeley
- Occupations: Professor, University of Wisconsin-Madison
- Awards: Honorary doctorate, Denison University (1996); James McKeen Cattell Fellow Award (2018)

Janet Shibley Hyde is the Helen Thompson Woolley Professor Emerit of Psychology and Gender & Women's Studies at the University of Wisconsin-Madison. She is known for her research on human sexuality, sex differences, gender development, gender and science, and feminist theory, and is considered one of the leading academics in the field of gender studies.

== Biography ==
Hyde received her BA in mathematics from Oberlin College in 1969. She continued her education at the University of California, Berkeley, where she completed her Ph.D. in psychology in 1972. Prior to joining the faculty of the University of Wisconsin-Madison in 1986, Hyde was a member of the faculty in the Department of Psychology at Bowling Green State University (1972–1979) and Denison University (1979–1986). She received an honorary doctorate degree in social science from Denison University in 1996.

Published in 2005, The Gender Similarities Hypothesis is a focal point of Hyde's work in the field. In this influential study, Hyde conducted a series of meta-analyses that documented how similar males and females are on most psychological variables, which contrasted with how different they are often perceived to be.

The royalties from her co-authored textbook Half the Human Experience go to the Janet Hyde Graduate Student Research Grants to support doctoral psychology students in feminist research. Hyde is also co-author of the textbook Understanding Human Sexuality.

Hyde received the Ernest R. Hilgard Lifetime Achievement Award presented by the American Psychological Association (APA) in 2016 and the James McKeen Cattell Fellow Award from the Association for Psychological Science in 2018. Previous awards include the Kinsey Award from the Society for the Scientific Study of Sexuality (1992), the Heritage Award from APA Division 35, Psychology of Women (1996), the Carolyn Wood Sherif Award from APA Division 35 (1998) for Men are From Earth, Women are From Earth. The Media vs. Science on Psychological Gender Differences, the APA Award for Distinguished Service to Psychological Science (2008), the Pioneer in the Psychology of Women Award from the Association for Women in Psychology (2009), and the Committee on Women in Psychology Award for Distinguished Leadership (2014). She is an elected Fellow of the Society for the Scientific Study of Sexuality.

== Representative publications ==
- Barnett, R. C., & Hyde, J. S. (2001). Women, men, work, and family. An expansionist theory. American Psychologist, 56(10), 781-796.
- Hyde, J. S. (2005). The gender similarities hypothesis. American Psychologist, 60(6), 581-592.
- Hyde, J. S., Fennema, E., & Lamon, S. J. (1990). Gender differences in mathematics performance: a meta-analysis. Psychological Bulletin, 107(2), 139-155.
- Hyde, J. S., Lindberg, S. M., Linn, M. C., Ellis, A., & Williams, C. (2008). Gender similarities characterize math performance. Science, 321, 494-495.
- Hyde, J. S., & Linn, M. C. (1988). Gender differences in verbal ability. Psychological Bulletin, 104(1), 53-69.
- Hyde, J. S. & Mertz, J. (2009). Gender, culture, and math. Proceedings of the National Academy of Sciences, 106, 8801-8807.
- Kling, K. C., Hyde, J. S., Showers, C. J., & Buswell, B. N. (1999). Gender differences in self-esteem: a meta-analysis. Psychological Bulletin, 125(4), 470-500.
- Oliver, M. B., & Hyde, J. S. (1993). Gender differences in sexuality: A meta-analysis. Psychological Bulletin, 114(1), 29-51.
