= John E. Hunter =

American psychologist (1939–2002)

John E. "Jack" Hunter (29 March 1939 – June 26, 2002) was an American psychology professor known for his work in methodology. His best-known work is Methods of Meta-Analysis: Correcting Error and Bias in Research Findings. The International Communication Association named a research award in his honor.

== Career ==
Hunter received his Ph.D. in psychology from the University of Illinois at Urbana-Champaign. He taught at Michigan State University for most of his career. He co-authored two books and authored or co-authored over 200 articles and book chapters on a wide variety of methodological topics, including confirmatory and exploratory factor analysis, meta-analysis, measurement theory and methods, statistics, and research methods. He also published numerous research articles on such substantive topics as intelligence, attitude change, the relation between attitudes and behavior, validity generalization, differential validity/selection fairness, and selection utility.

In 1994 he was one of 52 signatories on "Mainstream Science on Intelligence," an editorial written by Linda Gottfredson and published in the Wall Street Journal, which aimed to promote a reasoned discussion of the heated debate arising from publication of The Bell Curve on intelligence.

Hunter received the Distinguished Scientific Award for Contributions to Applied Psychology (joint with Frank L. Schmidt), and the Distinguished Scientific Contributions Award from the Society for Industrial and Organizational Psychology (SIOP) (also joint with Schmidt). He was a Fellow of the American Psychological Association, the American Psychological Society, and of SIOP.

== Publications ==
Hunter wrote or contributed to several publications. His 1990 book, co-authored with Frank L. Schmidt and listed below, cites 15 publications by Hunter, beginning with a 1977 paper, and 17 co-authored publications, of which from 1977 onwards, 12 were co-authored with Schmidt.

- Hunter, J.E (August 1977), Path Analysis: Longitudinal studies and causal analysis in program evaluation, Invited address presented at the 85th American Psychological Association, San Francisco
- Hunter, John E; Schmidt, Frank L (1977), "A critical analysis of the statistical and ethical implications of various definitions of test fairness", Psychological Bulletin, 83: 1053–1071, doi:10.1037/0033-2909.83.6.1053
- Hunter, John E; Schmidt, Frank L (1990), Methods of Meta-Analysis: Correcting Error and Bias in Research Findings, Newbury Park, California; London; New Delhi: SAGE Publications
