= International Journal of Selection and Assessment =

Psychology journal

- Discipline: Personnel psychology
- Language: English
- Edited by: Ioannis Nikolaou

Publication details
- History: 1993–present
- Publisher: John Wiley & Sons
- Frequency: Quarterly
- Impact factor: 1.840 (2020)

Standard abbreviations
- ISO 4: Int. J. Sel. Assess.

Indexing
- ISSN: 0965-075X (print); 1468-2389 (web)
- LCCN: 93648811
- OCLC no.: 299335344

Links
- Journal homepage; Online access; Online archive

The International Journal of Selection and Assessment is a quarterly peer-reviewed scientific journal covering personnel and managerial psychology. It was established in 1993 and is published by John Wiley & Sons. The editor-in-chiefs are Nicolas Roulin and Janneke Oostrom. According to the Journal Citation Reports, the journal has a 2020 impact factor of 1.840, ranking it 62nd out of 83 journals in the category "Psychology, Applied" and 191st out of 226 journals in the category "Management".
