= John P. Campbell (psychologist) =

American psychologist (1937–2025)

- Citizenship: American
- Education: Iowa State University (BS, MS); University of Minnesota (PhD)
- Scientific career
- Fields: Industrial and organizational psychology
- Thesis: (1964)

John P. Campbell (1937–2025) was an American psychologist.

His research focus was Industrial and organizational psychology.

Campbell was president of SIOP from 1977 to 1978. He was awarded the SIOP Distinguished Scientific Contributions award in 1991.

== Selected bibliography ==
- Campbell, J. P. (1990). Modelling the Performance Prediction Problem in Industrial and Organizational Psychology. In M. Dunnette, & L. M. Hough (Eds.), Handbook of Industrial and Organizational Psychology (2nd ed., pp. 687–731). Consulting Psychologists Press.
- Campbell, John P. (1990). "An Overview of the Army Selection and Classification Project (Project A)". Personnel Psychology. 43 (2): 231–39. ISSN 0031-5826.
