= Alphonse Chapanis =

American industrial designer (1917–2002)

Alphonse Chapanis (March 17, 1917 – October 4, 2002) was an American pioneer in the field of industrial design, and is widely considered one of the fathers of ergonomics or human factors – the science of ensuring that design takes account of human characteristics.

== Biography ==
Chapanis received a PhD in Psychology from Yale University in 1943.

He was notably active in improving aviation safety around the time of World War II, although his career covered a wide range of domains and applications.

One of his major contributions was shape coding in the aircraft cockpit. After a series of runway crashes of the Boeing B-17 Flying Fortress, Chapanis found that certain cockpit controls were confused with each other, due partly to their proximity and similarity of shape. Particularly, the controls for flaps and landing gear were confused, the consequences of which could be severe. Chapanis proposed attaching a wheel to the end of the landing gear control and a triangle to the end of the flaps control, to enable them to be easily distinguished by touch alone. Thereafter for that aircraft there were no further instances of the landing gear being mistakenly raised while the aircraft was still on the ground. This particular shape-coding of the landing gear lever is still regulated for use in civil aircraft.

In 1949 he published the first textbook on the subject of ergonomics, Applied Experimental Psychology: Human Factors in Engineering Design.

In the 1950s, Chapanis worked with Bell Labs on the design of push-button telephone handsets, conducting experiments that led to the present layout of the keys.
