= William Stewart Agras =

American psychiatrist

William Stewart Agras (born 17 May 1929 London) is an American psychiatrist and psychotherapist of British origin, research psychiatrist and Emeritus (Active) Professor of Psychiatry and Behavioral Science at Stanford University. He normally goes by Stewart Agras.

His primary research interest is in the application of basic psychology to investigation of behavior change in medical and psychiatric problems such as treatment compliance, essential hypertension and other cardiovascular risk factors, and anxiety disorders. In 1974 he began one of the first programs in Behavioral Medicine in the United States, a program that continues today at Stanford University. Beginning in 1985 the majority of his work has been in the area of eating disorders, with studies ranging from epidemiology, basic psychological mechanisms, and treatment. The principal theme of his research has been the understanding of human feeding and its disorders, namely: obesity, anorexia nervosa, bulimia nervosa, and binge eating disorder.

== Biography ==
Agras received his MD from the Middlesex Hospital Medical School now University College of the University of London in 1955. He did a residency and Fellowship in psychiatry at McGill University in Montreal, Quebec in 1956–1961.

From 1961–1969 Agras was a faculty member at the University of Vermont Medical College. He then served as Chair of the Department of Psychiatry at the University of Mississippi Medical Center in Jackson, Mississippi for the next four years where he developed a Department in which psychology and psychiatry were placed on an equal footing and the role of clinical psychologists became one of research and teaching.

Agras was an early developer of Behavioral Therapy. He came to Stanford in 1973.

He was Editor of the Journal of Applied Behavior Analysis from 1974–1977 and of the Annals of Behavioral Medicine from 1987–1990. He was also the first President of the Society for Behavioral Medicine 1978–1979, and President of the Association for the Advancement of Behavior Therapy 1985–1986.

== Publications ==
- Agras WS, Hammer LD, McNicholas F, Kraemer HC "Risk factors for childhood overweight: a prospective study from birth to 9.5 years." J Pediatr 2004; 145: 1: 20–5
- Agras WS, Brandt HA, Bulik CM, Dolan-Sewell R, Fairburn CG, Halmi KA, Herzog DB, Jimerson DC, Kaplan AS, Kaye WH, le Grange D, Lock J, Mitchell JE, Rudorfer MV, Street LL, Striegel-Moore R, Vitousek KM, Walsh BT, Wilfley DE "Report of the National Institutes of Health workshop on overcoming barriers to treatment research in anorexia nervosa." Int J Eat Disord 2004; 35: 4: 509–21
- Duke RE, Bryson S, Hammer LD, Agras WS "The relationship between parental factors at infancy and parent-reported control over children's eating at age 7." Appetite 2004; 43: 3: 247–52
- Kraemer HC, Wilson GT, Fairburn CG, Agras WS "Mediators and moderators of treatment effects in randomized clinical trials." Arch Gen Psychiatry 2002; 59: 10: 877–83
- McDermott C, Agras WS, Crow SJ, Halmi K, Mitchell JE, Bryson S "Participant recruitment for an anorexia nervosa treatment study." Int J Eat Disord 2004; 35: 1: 33–41
