= Roberta Michnick Golinkoff =

American academic

Roberta Michnick Golinkoff holds the Unidel H. Rodney Sharp Chair in the School of Education at the University of Delaware and is also a member of the Departments of Psychological and Brain Sciences and Linguistics and Cognitive Science.

An author of 14 books and over 150 professional articles on early childhood and infant development, she founded and directs the Child's Play, Learning, and Development Laboratory (formerly called The Infant Language Project), which investigates how young children learn their native language. Among her projects is the creation (with Jill de Villiers, Aquiles Iglesias, Kathy Hirsh-Pasek and Mary Wilson) of a computerized language assessment for preschoolers called the QUILS: Quick Interactive Language Screener.

Her research has been supported by funding from national agencies, including the National Science Foundation, the National Institutes of Health, the National Institute of Child Health and Human Development and the Institute of Education Sciences. Golinkoff served as an Associate Editor of Child Development, one of the premier research journals in her field, and serves on many advisory boards for organizations devoted to children's well-being and education. Golinkoff is a fellow of the American Psychological Association and the American Psychological Society.

Golinkoff also consults with toy companies, governmental bodies, children's museums and libraries, and other organizations. In addition, she is one of the founders of the Ultimate Block Party movement, an event that took place in Central Park to celebrate playful learning. It attracted over 50,000 people. Other Ultimate Block Parties were held in Toronto, Canada, and Baltimore, Maryland. Golinkoff does development work for childhood education company MindChamps.

== Education ==
Golinkoff received her bachelor's degree from Brooklyn College and her Ph.D. in Developmental Psychology from Cornell University. Her postdoctoral fellowship was completed at the University of Pittsburgh's Learning Research and Development Center.

== Awards ==
Golinkoff received the 2017 Society for Research in Child Development's Distinguished Scientific Contributions Award. In 2015, Golinkoff won two awards. From the American Psychological Association, she was named a Distinguished Scientific Lecturer. The Association for Psychological Science made her a James McKeen Cattell Fellow for "a lifetime of outstanding contributions to applied psychological research".

Golinkoff and her colleague Kathy Hirsh-Pasek of Temple University were joint recipients of the 2009 American Psychological Association Award for Distinguished Service to Psychological Science and the 2011 Urie Bronfenbrenner Award for Lifetime Contribution to Developmental Psychology in the Service of Science and Society from the American Psychological Association. Golinkoff was awarded a John Simon Guggenheim Memorial Fellowship and a James McKeen Cattell Sabbatical Award, both in 1988.

Her book, Einstein Never Used Flash Cards: How Our Children Really Learn and Why They Need to Play More and Memorize Less, was awarded the Multiple Sclerosis Society's Books for a Better Life Prize in its Psychology division in 2003

== Books ==
- Links Between Spatial and Mathematical Skills Across the Preschool Years (co-authored with B. Verdine, K. Hirsh-Pasek, & N. Newcombe, in press)
- Becoming Brilliant: What Science Tells Us About Raising Successful Children (co-authored with K. Hirsh-Pasek, 2016)
- A Mandate for Playful Learning in Preschool: Presenting the Evidence (co-authored with K. Hirsh-Pasek, L. Berk, & D. Singer, 2009)
- Celebrate the Scribble: Appreciating Children's Art (co-authored with K. Hirsh-Pasek, 2007)
- Play=Learning: How Play Motivates and Enhances Children's Cognitive and Social-Emotional Growth (co-edited with K. Hirsh-Pasek & D. Singer)
- Action Meets World: How Children Learn Verbs (co-edited with K. Hirsh-Pasek, 2006)
- Einstein Never Used Flash Cards: How Our Children Really Learn and Why They Need to Play More and Memorize Less (co-authored with K. Hirsh-Pasek, 2003)
- How Babies Talk: The Magic and Mystery of Language in the First Three Years of Life (co-authored with K. Hirsh-Pasek, 1999)
- Becoming a Word Learner: A Debate on Lexical Acquisition (co-authored with K. Hirsh-Pasek, L. Bloom, L. Smith, A. Woodward, N. Akhtar, M. Tomasello, & G. Hollich, 2000)
- Breaking the Language Barrier: An Emergentist Coalition Model for the Origins of the Word Learning (co-authored with K. Hirsh-Pasek & G. Hollich, 2000)
- The Origins and Growth of Communication (co-authored with L. Feagans & C. Garvey, 1984)
- The Transition from Prelinguistic to Linguistic Communication (1983)
- New Directions in Piagetian Theory and Practice (co-authored with I. Sigel & D. Brodzinsky, 1981)
