= Kathy Hirsh-Pasek =

American psychologist

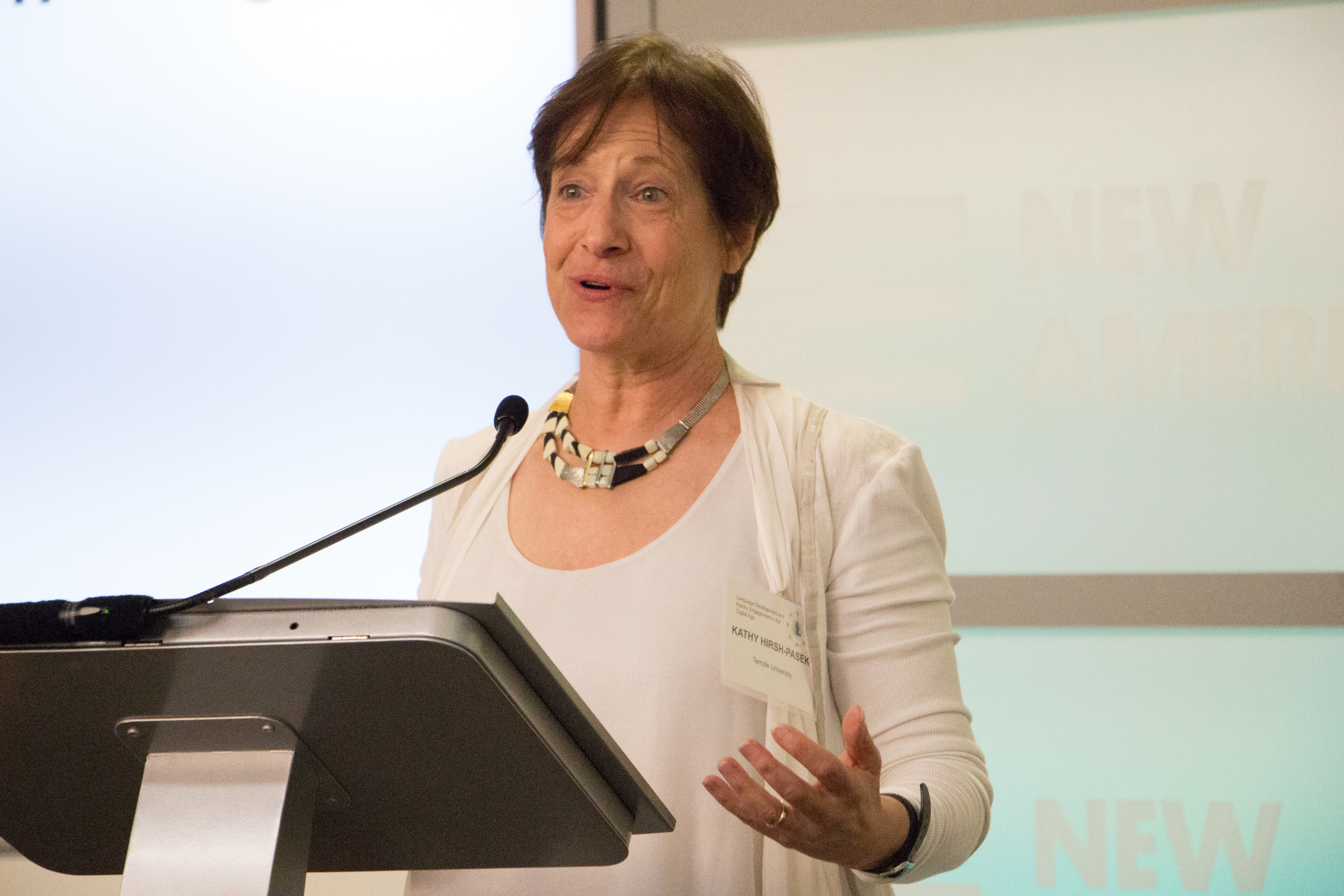
- Occupations: Psychologist; professor
- Children: 3, including Benj Pasek

Academic background
- Education: University of Pittsburgh (B.S.); University of Pennsylvania (Ph.D.)

Academic work
- Institutions: Temple University
- Main interests: Early childhood and infant development

Kathy Hirsh-Pasek is the Stanley and Debra Lefkowitz Professor of Psychology at Temple University in Philadelphia, where she directs the Temple University Infant Language Laboratory. She is the author of 14 books and over 200 publications on early childhood and infant development, with a specialty in language and literacy, and playful learning.

== Biography ==
Hirsh-Pasek was one of the investigators on the acclaimed National Institute of Child Health and Human Development Study of Early Child Care and Youth Development, co-authored the language and literacy curricula for the State of California Preschools, and serves as an advisor on the National Institutes of Health Toolbox initiative. She was co-creator of the moral development curricula, An Ethical Start, and speaks widely on ways to translate primary research findings into practice for young children.

Her research has been funded by the National Science Foundation (NSF), the Institute of Education Sciences (IES), and the National Institutes of Health and Human Development, among other institutions.

An advocate of the importance of play and playful education in early childhood, she is a founder and member of the executive committee of The Ultimate Block Party which drew more than 50,000 people to its inaugural event at Central Park in New York City in October 2010. She is also a founding member of the and Playful Learning Landscapes; the Latin American School for Educational and Cognitive Neuroscience, and of the Learning Science Exchange Fellowship. She does development work for childhood education company MindChamps.

Before coming to Temple, Hirsh-Pasek had served on the faculties of Rutgers University, Swarthmore College, and Haverford College.

Her book, Becoming Brilliant, written with colleague Roberta Golinkoff, was on the NYT Best Seller's list in education and parenting. Hirsh-Pasek is also a senior fellow at the Brookings Institution's Center for Universal Education. She was the past president of the International Congress of Infant Studies and was on the governing board of the Society for Research in Child Development.

Hirsh-Pasek has three sons: Dr. Josh Pasek, Dr. Michael H. Pasek, and composer Benj Pasek.

== Awards and honors ==
Hirsh-Pasek is a fellow of the American Psychological Association, the Cognitive Development Society, the American Educational Research Society and the American Psychological Society. Her book Einstein Never used Flashcards: How Children Really Learn and Why They Need to Play More and Memorize Less (Rodale, 2004) won the Books for Better Life Award for best psychology book.

Her latest book, Becoming Brilliant: What Science Tells Us about Raising Successful Children (2016), was on The New York Times Best Seller List in both education and parenting.

She and her longtime collaborator Roberta Michnick Golinkoff were joint recipients of the 2009 American Psychological Association (APA) Award for Distinguished Service to Psychological Science and the 2011 Urie Bronfenbrenner Award for Lifetime Contribution to Developmental Psychology in the Service of Science and Society from the American Psychological Association.

She is a recipient of the Association for Psychological Science (APS) James McKeen Cattell Award, the Society for Research in Child Development (SRCD) Distinguished Scientific Contributions to Child Development Award.

== Education ==
Hirsh-Pasek received her B.S. in psychology and music from the University of Pittsburgh and her Ph.D. in human development from the University of Pennsylvania.

== Books ==
- A Mandate for playful learning in preschool: Presenting the evidence. (co-authored with R. M., Golinkoff, L. Berk, & D. Singer, D. 2009)
- Celebrate the scribble: Appreciating children's art. (co-authored with R. M. Golinkoff, 2007)
- Play=Learning: How play motivates and enhances children's cognitive and social-emotional growth (co-edited with D. Singer & R.M. Golinkoff)
- Action meets word: How children learn verbs (co-edited with R.M. Golinkoff, 2006)
- Child Care and Child Development: Results from the NICHD Study of Early Child Care and Youth Development (co-edited with NICHD Study of Early Child Care Network, 2005)
- Einstein never used flashcards: How our children really learn and why they need to play more and memorize less. (co-authored with R.M. Golinkoff, 2003)
- Becoming a word learner: A debate on lexical acquisition. (co-edited with R.M. Golinkoff, N. Akhtar, L.Bloom, G. Hollich, 2000)
- Breaking the language barrier: An emergentist coalition model for the origins of word learning. (co-authored with G. Hollich & R.M. Golinkoff, 2000)
- How babies talk: The magic and mystery of language acquisition (co-authored with R.M. Golinkoff, 1999)
- The Origins of grammar: Evidence from comprehension. (Co-authored with R.M. Golinkoff, 1996)
- Academic instruction in early childhood: Challenge or pressure? (co-edited with L. Rescorla and M. Hyson)
- Becoming Brilliant: What Science Tells Us about Raising Successful Children (Golinkoff & Hirsh-Pasek, 2016)
