= Karen A. Matthews =

American psychiatrist and psychologist

- Education: University of California at Berkeley (AB); California State University at San Jose (MA); University of Texas at Austin (PhD)
- Known for: contributions to health psychology
- Scientific career
- Workplaces: University of Pittsburgh

Karen A. Matthews is an American health psychologist known for her research on the epidemiology and risk factors associated with cardiovascular disease, early signs of coronary heart disease risk in children, women's health and menopause, and connections between socioeconomic status and health. She is Distinguished Professor Emerita of Psychiatry and Professor Emerita of Psychology and Epidemiology at the University of Pittsburgh.

== Education ==
Matthews received a bachelor's degree in psychology from the University of California, Berkeley in 1968. In 1971, she received a master's degree in psychology from California State University at San Jose. She received a PhD in psychology from the University of Texas at Austin in 1976, where she was mentored by David C. Glass and Arnold Buss. She conducted her dissertation research, Mother-child interactions as a determinant of Type A behavior, under the supervision of Arnold Buss.

== Career ==
Matthews has served as a Distinguished Professor of Psychiatry, Epidemiology, Psychology, and Clinical and Translational Science at the University of Pittsburgh since 2009. She became Distinguished Professor Emerita in 2021. Matthews was the program director for the university's Cardiovascular Behavioral Medicine Research Training Program, which she and Dr. Manuck started in 1983, through July 2020. She led the Pittsburgh site of the Study of Women's Health Across the Nation (SWAN) from its inception through 2020. She was elected in 2002 into the National Academy of Medicine.

From 1973 through 1978, Matthews held instructor and research associate positions at the University of Texas at Austin and Kansas State University. She has also served as: president of the Division of Health Psychology and the American Psychosomatic Society; a member of Council of the National Heart Lung and Blood Institute and the advisory board for the NIH Center for Scientific Research; and editor-in-chief of Health Psychology. She was also director of the Pittsburgh Mind-Body Center.

== Awards ==
- Society of Behavioral Medicine Distinguished Scientist Award (1999)
- American Psychological Association Distinguished Scientific Award for the Applications of Psychology (2005)
- American Psychosomatic Society President's Award (2005)
- Philosophiae Doctor Honoris Causa, University of Helsinki, Finland (2007)
- Nathan W. Perry, Jr. Award for Career Service to Health Psychology (2011)
- James McKeen Cattell Lifetime Achievement Award for Applied Research, Association of Psychological Science (2013)
- American Psychosomatic Society Patricia R. Barchas Award (2013)
- Academy of Behavioral Medicine Research Lifetime Achievement Award (2017)
- American Psychosomatic Society Distinguished Scientist Award (2020)

== Selected works ==
- Gallo LC, Matthews KA (2003). Understanding the association between socioeconomic status and health: Do negative emotions play a role? Psychological Bulletin 129: 10-51.
- Matthews KA, Salomon K, Brady SS, Allen MT (2003). Cardiovascular reactivity to stress predicts future blood pressure in adolescence. Psychosomatic Medicine 65: 402-409.
- Matthews KA (2005). Psychological perspectives on the development of coronary heart disease. 60: 780-796.
- Matthews KA, Kuller LH, Chang Y, Edmundowicz D. Premenopausal risk factors for coronary and aortic calcification: A 20 year follow-up in the Healthy Women Study. Preventive Medicine 45:302-308.
- Matthews KA, Gallo LC (2011) Psychological perspectives on pathways linking socioeconomic status and physical health. Annual Review of Psychology 62:501-530.
- Matthews KA, Pantesco EJ (2016). Sleep characteristics and cardiovascular risk in children and adolescence: An enumerative review. Sleep Medicine 18:36-49.
- Matthews KA, Adler N, Forrest CB, Stead W (2016). Collecting psychosocial ‘vital signs’ in electronic health record: Why now? What are they? What’s new for psychology? American Psychologist 71:497-504.
- Matthews KA, Hall M, Lee L, Kravitz HM, Appelhans BM, Swanson LM Neal-Perry GS, Joffe H (2019). Racial/ethnic disparities in women’s sleep duration, continuity, and quality and their statistical medicators: Study of Women’s Health Across the Nation. Sleep 42:zsz042.
- El Khoudary SR, Greendale G, Crawford SL, Avis NE, Brooks MM, Thurston RC, Karvonen-Gutierrez C, Waetjen LE, Matthews KA (2019). The menopause transition and women’s health at midlife: A progress report from the Study of Women’s Health Across the Nation (SWAN). Menopause. 26:1213-1227.
