= Imitation =

Behaviour in which an individual observes and replicates another's behaviour

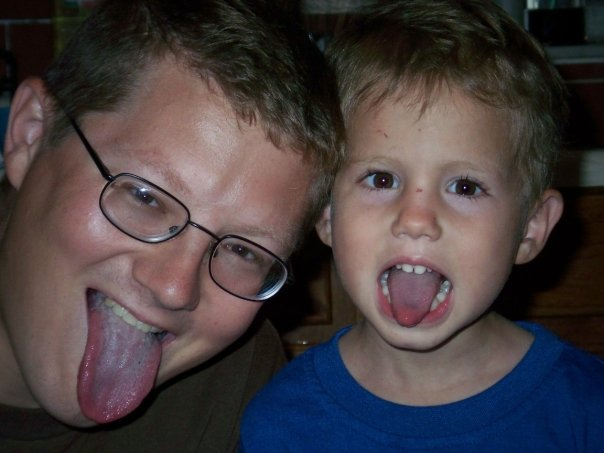
A toddler imitates his father.

Imitation (from Latin imitatio, "a copying") is a behavior whereby an individual observes and replicates another's behavior. Imitation is also a form of learning that leads to the "development of traditions, and ultimately our culture. It allows for the transfer of information (behaviors, customs, etc.) between individuals and down generations without the need for genetic inheritance." The word imitation can be applied in many contexts, ranging from animal training to politics. The term generally refers to conscious behavior; subconscious imitation is termed mirroring.

== Anthropology and social sciences ==
In anthropology, some theories hold that all cultures imitate ideas from one of a few original cultures or several cultures whose influence overlaps geographically. Evolutionary diffusion theory holds that cultures influence one another, but that similar ideas can be developed in isolation.

Scholars as well as popular authors have argued that the role of imitation in humans is unique among animals. However, this claim has been recently challenged by scientific research which observed social learning and imitative abilities in animals.

Psychologist Kenneth Kaye showed that the ability of infants to match the sounds or gestures of an adult depends on an interactive process of turn-taking over many successive trials, in which adults' instinctive behavior plays as great a role as that of the infant. These writers assume that evolution would have selected imitative abilities as fit because those who were good at it had a wider arsenal of learned behavior at their disposal, including tool-making and language.

However, research also suggests that imitative behaviors and other social learning processes are only selected for when outnumbered or accompanied by asocial learning processes: an over-saturation of imitation and imitating individuals leads humans to collectively copy inefficient strategies and evolutionarily maladaptive behaviors, thereby reducing flexibility to new environmental contexts that require adaptation. Research suggests imitative social learning hinders the acquisition of knowledge in novel environments and in situations where asocial learning is faster and more advantageous.

In the mid-20th century, social scientists began to study how and why people imitate ideas. Everett Rogers pioneered innovation diffusion studies, identifying factors in adoption and profiles of adopters of ideas. Imitation mechanisms play a central role in both analytical and empirical models of collective human behavior.

== Neuroscience ==
Humans are capable of imitating movements, actions, skills, behaviors, gestures, pantomimes, mimics, vocalizations, sounds, speech, etc. and that we have particular "imitation systems" in the brain is old neurological knowledge dating back to Hugo Karl Liepmann. Liepmann's model 1908 "Das hierarchische Modell der Handlungsplanung" (the hierarchical model of action planning) is still valid. On studying the cerebral localization of function, Liepmann postulated that planned or commanded actions were prepared in the parietal lobe of the brain's dominant hemisphere, and also frontally. His most important pioneering work is when extensively studying patients with lesions in these brain areas, he discovered that the patients lost (among other things) the ability to imitate. He was the one who coined the term "apraxia" and differentiated between ideational and ideomotor apraxia. It is in this basic and wider frame of classical neurological knowledge that the discovery of the mirror neuron has to be seen. Though mirror neurons were first discovered in macaques, their discovery also relates to humans.

Human brain studies using functional magnetic resonance imaging (fMRI) revealed a network of regions in the inferior frontal cortex and inferior parietal cortex which are typically activated during imitation tasks. It has been suggested that these regions contain mirror neurons similar to the mirror neurons recorded in the macaque monkey. However, it is not clear if macaques spontaneously imitate each other in the wild.

Neurologist V. S. Ramachandran argues that the evolution of mirror neurons were important in the human acquisition of complex skills such as language and believes the discovery of mirror neurons to be a most important advance in neuroscience. However, little evidence directly supports the theory that mirror neuron activity is involved in cognitive functions such as empathy or learning by imitation.

Evidence is accumulating that bottlenose dolphins employ imitation to learn hunting and other skills from other dolphins.

Japanese monkeys have been seen to spontaneously begin washing potatoes after seeing humans washing them.

== Mirror neuron system ==
Research has been conducted to locate where in the brain specific parts and neurological systems are activated when humans imitate behaviors and actions of others, discovering a mirror neuron system. This neuron system allows a person to observe and then recreate the actions of others. Mirror neurons are premotor and parietal cells in the macaque brain that fire when the animal performs a goal directed action and when it sees others performing the same action." Evidence suggests that the mirror neuron system also allows people to comprehend and understand the intentions and emotions of others. Problems of the mirror neuron system may be correlated with the social inadequacies of autism. There have been many studies done showing that children with autism, compared with typically-developing children, demonstrate reduced activity in the frontal mirror neuron system area when observing or imitating facial emotional expressions. Of course, the higher the severity of the disease, the lower the activity in the mirror neuron system is.

== Animal behavior ==
Scientists debate whether animals can consciously imitate the unconscious incitement from sentinel animals, whether imitation is uniquely human, or whether humans do a complex version of what other animals do. The current controversy is partly definitional. Thorndike uses "learning to do an act from seeing it done." It has two major shortcomings: first, by using "seeing" it restricts imitation to the visual domain and excludes, e.g., vocal imitation and, second, it would also include mechanisms such as priming, contagious behavior and social facilitation, which most scientist distinguish as separate forms of observational learning. Thorpe suggested defining imitation as "the copying of a novel or otherwise improbable act or utterance, or some act for which there is clearly no instinctive tendency." This definition is favored by many scholars, though questions have been raised how strictly the term "novel" has to be interpreted and how exactly a performed act has to match the demonstration to count as a copy.

Hayes and Hayes (1952) used the "do-as-I-do" procedure to demonstrate the imitative abilities of their trained chimpanzee "Viki." Their study was repeatedly criticized for its subjective interpretations of their subjects' responses. Replications of this study found much lower matching degrees between subjects and models. However, imitation research focusing on the copying fidelity got new momentum from a study by Voelkl and Huber. They analyzed the motion trajectories of both model and observer monkeys and found a high matching degree in their movement patterns.

Paralleling these studies, comparative psychologists provided tools or apparatuses that could be handled in different ways. Heyes and co-workers reported evidence for imitation in rats that pushed a lever in the same direction as their models, though later on they withdrew their claims due to methodological problems in their original setup. By trying to design a testing paradigm that is less arbitrary than pushing a lever to the left or to the right, Custance and co-workers introduced the "artificial fruit" paradigm, where a small object could be opened in different ways to retrieve food placed inside—not unlike a hard-shelled fruit. Using this paradigm, scientists reported evidence for imitation in monkeys and apes. There remains a problem with such tool (or apparatus) use studies: what animals might learn in such studies need not be the actual behavior patterns (i.e., the actions) that were observed. Instead they might learn about some effects in the environment (i.e., how the tool moves, or how the apparatus works). This type of observational learning, which focuses on results, not actions, has been dubbed emulation (see Emulation (observational learning)).

In an article written by Carl Zimmer, he looked into a study being done by Derek Lyons, focusing on human evolution, in which he studied a chimpanzee. He first started with showing the chimpanzee how to retrieve food from a box. The chimpanzee soon caught on and did exactly what the scientist just did. They wanted to see if the chimpanzee's brain functioned just like a human brain, so they replicated the experiment using 16 children, following the same procedure; once the children saw how it was done, they followed the same exact steps.

=== Imitation in animals ===
Blackbird imitating the vehicle motion alarm of a local garbage truck in Brastad, Sweden.

Imitation in animals is a study in the field of social learning where learning behavior is observed in animals specifically how animals learn and adapt through imitation. Ethologists can classify imitation in animals by the learning of certain behaviors from conspecifics. More specifically, these behaviors are usually unique to the species and can be complex in nature and can benefit the individual's survival.

Some scientists believe true imitation is only produced by humans, arguing that simple learning though sight is not enough to sustain as a being who can truly imitate. Thorpe defines true imitation as "the copying of a novel or otherwise improbable act or utterance, or some act for which there is clearly no instinctive tendency," which is highly debated for its portrayal of imitation as a mindless repeating act. True imitation is produced when behavioral, visual and vocal imitation is achieved, not just the simple reproduction of exclusive behaviors. Imitation is not a simple reproduction of what one sees; rather it incorporates intention and purpose. Animal imitation can range from survival purpose; imitating as a function of surviving or adapting, to unknown possible curiosity, which vary between different animals and produce different results depending on the measured intelligence of the animal.

There is considerable evidence to support true imitation in animals. Experiments performed on apes, birds and more specifically the Japanese quail have provided positive results to imitating behavior, demonstrating imitation of opaque behavior. However the problem that lies is in the discrepancies between what is considered true imitation in behavior. Birds have demonstrated visual imitation, where the animal simply does as it sees. Studies on apes however have proven more advanced results in imitation, being able to remember and learn from what they imitate. Songbirds have specialized brain circuits for song learning and can imitate vocalizations of others. It is well established that birdsong is a type of animal culture transmitted across generations in certain groups. Studies have demonstrated far more positive results with behavioral imitation in primates and birds than any other type of animal. Imitation in non-primate mammals and other animals have been proven difficult to conclude solid positive results for and poses a difficult question to scientists on why that is so.

==== Theories ====
There are two types of theories of imitation, transformational and associative. Transformational theories suggest that the information that is required to display certain behavior is created internally through cognitive processes and observing these behaviors provides incentive to duplicate them. Meaning we already have the codes to recreate any behavior and observing it results in its replication. Albert Bandura's "social cognitive theory" is one example of a transformational theory. Associative, or sometimes referred to as "contiguity", theories suggest that the information required to display certain behaviors does not come from within ourselves but solely from our surroundings and experiences. These theories have not yet provided testable predictions in the field of social learning in animals and have yet to conclude strong results.

==== New developments ====
There have been three major developments in the field of animal imitation. The first, behavioral ecologists and experimental psychologists found there to be adaptive patterns in behaviors in different vertebrate species in biologically important situations. The second, primatologists and comparative psychologists have found imperative evidence that suggest true learning through imitation in animals. The third, population biologists and behavioral ecologists created experiments that demand animals to depend on social learning in certain manipulated environments.

== Child development ==
Developmental psychologist Jean Piaget noted that children in a developmental phase he called the sensorimotor stage (a period which lasts up to the first two years of a child) begin to imitate observed actions. This is an important stage in the development of a child because the child is beginning to think symbolically, associating behaviors with actions, thus setting the child up for the development of further symbolic thinking. Imitative learning also plays a crucial role in the development of cognitive and social communication behaviors, such as language, play, and joint attention. Imitation serves as both a learning and a social function because new skills and knowledge are acquired, and communication skills are improved by interacting in social and emotional exchanges. It is shown, however, that "children with autism exhibit significant deficits in imitation that are associated with impairments in other social communication skills." To help children with autism, reciprocal imitation training (RIT) is used. It is a naturalistic imitation intervention that helps teach the social benefits of imitation during play by increasing child responsiveness and by increasing imitative language.

Reinforcement learning, both positive and negative, and punishment, are used by people that children imitate to either promote or discontinue behavior. If a child imitates a certain type of behavior or action and the consequences are rewarding, the child is very likely to continue performing the same behavior or action. The behavior "has been reinforced (i.e. strengthened)". However, if the imitation is not accepted and approved by others, then the behavior will be weakened.

Naturally, children are surrounded by many different types of people that influence their actions and behaviors, including parents, family members, teachers, peers, and even characters on television programs. These different types of individuals that are observed are called models. According to Saul McLeod, "these models provide examples of masculine and feminine behavior to observe and imitate." Children imitate the behavior they have observed from others, regardless of the gender of the person and whether or not the behavior is gender appropriate. However, it has been proven that children will reproduce the behavior that "its society deems appropriate for its sex."

=== Infants ===
Infants have the ability to reveal an understanding of certain outcomes before they occur, therefore in this sense they can somewhat imitate what they have perceived. Andrew N. Meltzoff, ran a series of tasks involving 14-month-old infants to imitate actions they perceived from adults. In this gathering he had concluded that the infants, before trying to reproduce the actions they wish to imitate, somehow revealed an understanding of the intended goal even though they failed to replicate the result wished to be imitated. These task implicated that the infants knew the goal intended. Gergely, Bekkering, and Király (2002) figured that infants not only understand the intended goal but also the intentions of the person they were trying to imitate engaging in "rational imitation", as described by Tomasello, Carpenter and others

It has long been claimed that newborn humans imitate bodily gestures and facial expressions as soon as their first few days of life. For example, in a study conducted at the Mailman Centre for Child Development at the University of Miami Medical School, 74 newborn babies (with a mean age of 36 hours) were tested to see if they were able to imitate a smile, a frown and a pout, and a wide-open mouth and eyes. An observer stood behind the experimenter (so he/she couldn't see what facial expressions were being made by the experimenter) and watched only the babies' facial expressions, recording their results. Just by looking only at the babies' faces, the observer was more often able to correctly guess what facial expression was being presented to the child by the experimenter. After the results were calculated, "the researchers concluded that...babies have an innate ability to compare an expression they see with their own sense of muscular feedback from making the movements to match that expression."

However, the idea that imitation is an inborn ability has been recently challenged. A research group from the University of Queensland in Australia carried out the largest-ever longitudinal study of neonatal imitation in humans. One hundred and nine newborns were shown a variety of gestures including tongue protrusion, mouth opening, happy and sad facial expressions, at four time points between one week and 9 weeks of age. The results failed to reveal compelling evidence that newborns imitate: Infants were just as likely to produce matching and non-matching gestures in response to what they saw.

At around eight months, infants will start to copy their child care providers' movements when playing pat-a-cake and peek-a-boo, as well as imitating familiar gestures, such as clapping hands together or patting a doll's back. At around 18 months, infants will then begin to imitate simple actions they observe adults doing, such as taking a toy phone out of a purse and saying "hello", pretending to sweep with a child-sized broom, as well as imitating using a toy hammer.

=== Toddlers ===
At around 30–36 months, toddlers will start to imitate their parents by pretending to get ready for work and school and saying the last word(s) of what an adult just said. For example, toddlers may say "bowl" or "a bowl" after they hear someone say, "That's a bowl." They may also imitate the way family members communicate by using the same gestures and words. For example, a toddler will say, "Mommy bye-bye" after the father says, "Mommy went bye-bye."

Toddlers tend to imitate their parents and guardians when they can; imitation helps toddlers learn, with the resulting experiences making lasting impressions, 12- to 36-month-olds learn by doing and not by watching.

Duke developmental psychologist Carol Eckerman did a study on toddlers imitating toddlers and found that at the age of 2 children involve themselves in imitation play to communicate with one another. This can be seen within a culture or across different cultures. 3 common imitative patterns Eckerman found were reciprocal imitation, follow-the-leader, and lead-follow.

Kenneth Kaye's "apprenticeship" theory of imitation rejected assumptions that other authors had made about its development. His research showed that there is no one simple imitation skill with its own course of development. What changes is the type of behavior imitated.

An important agenda for infancy is the progressive imitation of higher levels of use of signs, until the ultimate achievement of symbols. The principal role played by parents in this process is their provision of salient models within the facilitating frames that channel the infant's attention and organize his imitative efforts.

=== Gender and age differences ===
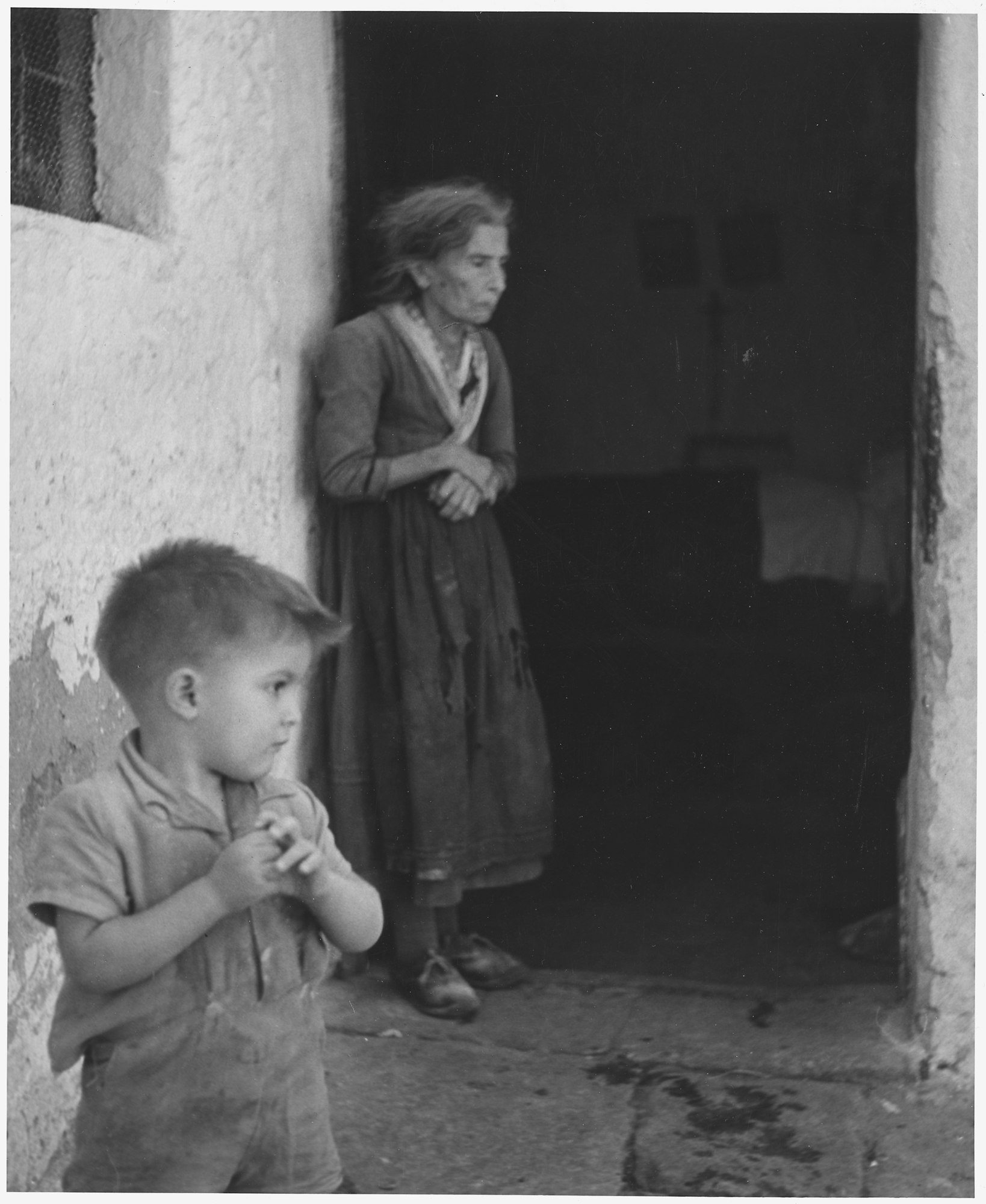
A small boy of Matera, Italy, unconsciously repeats the gesture of his grandmother's hands, ca. 1948 – ca. 1955

Imitation and imitative behaviors do not manifest ubiquitously and evenly in all human individuals; some individuals rely more on imitated information than others. Although imitation is very useful when it comes to cognitive learning with toddlers, research has shown that there are some gender and age differences when it comes to imitation. Research done to judge imitation in toddlers 2–3 years old shows that when faced with certain conditions "2-year-olds displayed more motor imitation than 3-year-olds, and 3-year-olds displayed more verbal-reality imitation than 2-year-olds. Boys displayed more motor imitation than girls."

No other research is more controversial pertaining gender differences in toddler imitation than psychologist, Bandura's, bobo doll experiments. The goal of the experiment was to see what happens to toddlers when exposed to aggressive and non-aggressive adults, would the toddlers imitate the behavior of the adults and if so, which gender is more likely to imitate the aggressive adult. In the beginning of the experiment Bandura had several predictions that actually came true. Children exposed to violent adults will imitate the actions of that adult when the adult is not present, boys who had observed an adult of the opposite sex act aggressively are less likely to act violently than those who witnessed a male adult act violently. In fact "boys who observed an adult male behaving violently were more influenced than those who had observed a female model behavior aggressively". One observation was that while boys are likely to imitate physical acts of violence, girls are likely to imitate verbal acts of violence.

=== Negative imitation ===
Imitation plays a major role on how a toddler interprets the world. Much of a child's understanding is derived from imitation, due to a lack of verbal skill imitation in toddlers for communication. It is what connects them to the communicating world, as they continue to grow they begin to learn more. This may mean that it is crucial for parents to be cautious as to how they act and behave around their toddlers. Imitation is the toddlers way of confirming and dis-conforming socially acceptable actions in society. Actions like washing dishes, cleaning up the house and doing chores are actions you want your toddlers to imitate. Imitating negative things is something that is never beyond young toddlers. If they are exposed to cursing and violence, it is going to be what the child views as the norm of their world, since imitation is the "mental activity that helps to formulate the conceptions of the world for toddlers". So it is important for parents to be careful what they say or do in front of their children.

=== Autism ===
Children with autism exhibit significant impairment in imitation skills. Imitation deficits have been reported on a variety of tasks including symbolic and non-symbolic body movements, symbolic and functional object use, vocalizations, and facial expressions. In contrast, typically-developing children can copy a broad range of novel (as well as familiar) rules from a very early age. Problems with imitation discriminate children with autism from those with other developmental disorders as early as age 2 and continue into adulthood.

Children with autism exhibit significant deficits in imitation that are associated with impairments in other social communication skills. It is unclear whether imitation is mediating these relationships directly, or whether they are due to some other developmental variable that is also reflected in the measurement of imitation skills.

On the contrary, research from the early 21st century suggests that people affected with forms of high-functioning autism easily interact with one another by using a more analytically-centered communication approach rather than an imitative cue-based approach, suggesting that reduced imitative capabilities do not affect abilities for expressive social behavior but only the understanding of said social behavior. Social communication is not negatively affected when said communication involves less or no imitation. Children with autism may have significant problems understanding typical social communication not because of inherent social deficits, but because of differences in communication style which affect reciprocal understanding.

Autistic individuals are also shown to possess increased analytical, cognitive, and visual processing, suggesting that they have no true impairments in observing the actions of others but may decide not to imitate them because they do not analytically understand them. A 2016 study has shown that involuntary, spontaneous facial mimicry – which supposedly depends on the mirror neuron system – is intact in individuals with autism, contrasting with previous studies and suggesting that the mirror neuron system is not inherently broken in autistic individuals.

== Automatic imitation ==
The automatic imitation comes very fast when a stimulus is given to replicate. The imitation can match the commands with the visual stimulus (compatible) or it cannot match the commands with the visual stimulus (incompatible). For example: 'Simon Says', a game played with children where they are told to follow the commands given by the adult. In this game, the adult gives the commands and shows the actions; the commands given can either match the action to be done or it will not match the action. The children who imitate the adult who has given the command with the correct action will stay in the game. The children who imitate the command with the wrong action will go out of the game, and this is where the child's automatic imitation comes into play. Psychologically, the visual stimulus being looked upon by the child is being imitated faster than the imitation of the command. In addition, the response times were faster in compatible scenarios than in incompatible scenarios.

== Over-imitation ==
Over-imitation is "the tendency of young children to copy all of an adult model's actions, even components that are irrelevant for the task at hand." According to this human and cross-cultural phenomenon, a child has a strong tendency to automatically encode the deliberate action of an adult as causally meaningful even when the child observes evidence that proves that its performance is unnecessary. It is suggested that over-imitation "may be critical to the transmission of human culture." Experiments done by Lyons et al. (2007) has shown that when there are obvious pedagogical cues, children tend to imitate step by step, including many unnecessary steps; without pedagogical cues, children will simply skip those useless steps.

However, another study suggests that children do not just "blindly follow the crowd" since they can also be just as discriminating as adults in choosing whether an unnecessary action should be copied or not. They may imitate additional but unnecessary steps to a novel process if the adult demonstrations are all the same. However, in cases where one out of four adults showed a better technique, only 40% actually copied the extra step, as described by Evans, Carpenter and others. Children's imitation is selective, also known as "selective imitation". Studies have shown that children tend to imitate older, competitive, and trustworthy individuals.

== Deferred imitation ==
Piaget coined the term deferred imitation and suggested that it arises out of the child's increasing ability to "form mental representations of behavior performed by others." Deferred imitation is also "the ability to reproduce a previously witnessed action or sequence of actions in the absence of current perceptual support for the action." Instead of copying what is currently occurring, individuals repeat the action or behavior later on. It appears that infants show an improving ability for deferred imitation as they get older, especially by 24 months. By 24 months, infants are able to imitate action sequences after a delay of up to three months, meaning that "they're able to generalize knowledge they have gained from one test environment to another and from one test object to another."

A child's deferred imitation ability "to form mental representations of actions occurring in everyday life and their knowledge of communicative gestures" has also been linked to earlier productive language development. Between 9 (preverbal period) and 16 months (verbal period), deferred imitation performance on a standard actions-on-objects task was consistent in one longitudinal study testing participants' ability to complete a target action, with high achievers at 9 months remaining so at 16 months. Gestural development at 9 months was also linked to productive language at 16 months. Researchers now believe that early deferred imitation ability is indicative of early declarative memory, also considered a predictor of productive language development.

== See also ==
- Appropriation (sociology)
- Articulation (sociology)
- Associative Sequence Learning
- Cognitive imitation
- Copycat crime
- Copycat suicide
- Identification (psychology)
- Mimicry
- Royal Commission on Animal Magnetism
