= Imitative learning =

Type of social learning

Imitative learning is a type of social learning whereby new behaviors are acquired via imitation. Imitation aids in communication, social interaction, and the ability to modulate one's emotions to account for the emotions of others, and is "essential for healthy sensorimotor development and social functioning". The ability to match one's actions to those observed in others occurs in humans and animals; This phenomenon has evolutionary roots as it increases an individual's chances of survival in avoiding the costs of individual learning.

Imitative learning is different from observational learning in that it requires a duplication of the behaviour exhibited by the model, whereas observational learning can occur when the learner observes an unwanted behaviour and its subsequent consequences and as a result learns to avoid that behaviour. Thorpe's (1956) definition of true imitation is useful he describes it as the 'copying of a novel or improbable act for which there is clearly no instinctive tendency'.

== Imitative learning in animals ==
Whether true imitation occurs in animals is a debated topic. For an action to be an instance of imitative learning, an animal must observe and reproduce the specific pattern of movements produced by the model. Some researchers have proposed evidence that true imitation does not occur in non-primates, and that the observational learning exhibited involves less cognitively complex means such as stimulus enhancement.

Research performed by A.L. Saggerson, David N. George, and R.C. Honey showed that pigeons were able to learn a basic process that would lead to the delivery of a reward by watching a demonstrator pigeon. A demonstrator pigeon was trained to peck a panel in response to one stimulus (e.g. a red light) and hop on the panel in response to a second stimulus (e.g. a green light). After proficiency in this task was established in the demonstrator pigeon, other learner pigeons were placed in a video-monitored observation chamber. After every second observed trial, these learner pigeons were then individually placed in the demonstrator pigeon's box and presented the same test. The learner pigeons displayed competent performance on the task, and thus it was concluded that the learner pigeons had formed a response-outcome association while observing. However, learner pigeons needed prior training on the responses to show imitative learning, and hence the researchers noted that an alternative interpretation of these results could be that the learner pigeons had instead acquired outcome-response associations that guided their behavior and that further testing was needed to establish if this was a valid alternative. Thus, while pigeons demonstrated observational learning, it was concluded that they did not exhibit true imitation according to Thorpe's (1956) definition.

A similar study was conducted by Chesler, which compared kittens learning to press a lever for food after seeing their mother do it to kittens who had not. A stimulus in the form of a flickering light was presented, after which the kitten has to press a lever in order to obtain a food reward. The experiment tested the responses of three groups of kittens: those that observed their mother's performance first before attempting the task, those that observed a strange female's performance, and those that did not have a demonstrator and had to complete it through trial and error (the control group). The study found that the kittens that observed their mother before attempting the task acquired the lever-pressing response faster than the kittens that observed a strange female's response. The kittens conducting the task through trial and error never acquired the response. This result suggests that the kittens learned from imitating a model. The study also speculates whether the primacy of imitative learning, as opposed to trial end error, was due to a social and biological response to the mother in which the affective bond between a kitten and its mother enhanced the kitten's observational learning (a type of learning bias).

Chimpanzees are more apt to learning by emulation rather than true imitation. The exception is encultured chimpanzees, which are chimpanzees raised as if they were children. In one study by Buttelman et al., encultured chimpanzees were found to behave similarly to young children and imitate even those actions that were non instrumental to achieving the desired goal. In other studies of true imitation, encultered chimpanzees even imitated the behaviour of a model some time after initially observing it.

== Imitative learning in humans ==
Imitative learning has been well documented in humans; they are often used as a comparison group in studies of imitative learning in primates. In the social learning theory, it is claimed that much of human behaviour specifically has been acquired through learning others' behaviour and not through individual trail-and-error. Humans are also said to demonstrate overimitation, which is when individuals faithfully copy all the steps of a process even when they do not understand why some steps are necessary. This is a higher fidelity to imitation as compared to other primates. Imitative learning also plays an important role in humans in cultural development. Learning from others allows the body of cultural information to accumulate and improve across generations, resulting in evolution of culture over time.

This higher level of imitation is evidenced in an experiment comparing the cognitive abilities between children, chimps and orangutans across domains of space, quantities, causality and social learning. What was found is that the 3 species scored relatively the same in all domains except social learning, in which children did exceptionally well comparatively – scoring an average of 85% on tests, while chimpanzees and orangutans scored around 10% and 6% respectively.

Another study by Horner and Whiten compared the actions of (non-encultured) chimpanzees to human children and found that the children over-imitated actions beyond necessity. In the study, children and chimpanzees between the ages of 3 and 4 were shown a series of actions to open an opaque puzzle box with a reward inside. Two of the actions were necessary to open the box, but one was not, however this was not known by the subjects. A demonstrator performed all three actions to open the box, after which both the chimpanzees and the children attempted the task. Both the children and the chimpanzees copied all three of the behaviours and received the reward inside of the box. The next phase of the study involved a transparent box instead of the opaque box. Due to the transparency of this box, it could clearly be seen that one of the three actions was not necessary to receive the reward. The chimpanzees did not perform the unnecessary action and only performed the two actions necessary to achieve the desired goal. The young children imitated all three actions, despite the fact that they could have selectively ignored irrelevant actions. While chimpanzees dropped all irrelevant actions once causal information was available, human children imitated the demonstrator's actions with a high level of fidelity even at the expense of efficiency towards the goal of the task. While notably it was a human demonstrator performing actions for both species, this nonetheless demonstrates the inclination humans have towards faithful imitation over one's own sense of learning and reason.

=== Learning biases in human Imitation ===
Humans are also subject to learning biases when selecting which model's behaviour to imitate, and tending to choose models who are more likely to possess information that will increase the learner's survival and reproduction. Examples of some learning biases are the conformity bias, success bias, prestige bias and self-similarity biases, which will be explained in greater detail.

==== Conformity bias ====
A study by Clegg and Legare tested this by demonstrating a method of making a necklace to young children. In demonstrations, the model added a step which was not necessary for the achievement of the final goal of completing the necklace. In one demonstration, the model used a language cue to inform the children that the making of the necklace is instrumental, e.g., "I am going to make a necklace. Let's watch what I am doing. I am going to make a necklace." In another demonstration, the model used language cues to imply that they were making the necklace according to convention, e.g., "I always do it this way. Everyone always does it this way. Let's watch what I am doing. Everyone always does it this way." In the conventional condition, children copied the model with more fidelity, including the unnecessary step. In the instrumental condition, they did not copy the unnecessary step. The study suggests that children discern when to imitate, viewing convention as a salient reason for copying behaviour in order to fit in with the convention. Taking cues for proper behaviour from the actions of others, rather than using independent judgement, is called a conformity bias.

==== Success bias ====
The success bias is when humans imitate individuals deemed successful in the field they also wish to be successful in. An experiment game conducted by Moore, Smith and Salemi in 2001 presented MBA students with a sum of money to allocate across 3 different investment options. They would receive different monetary return rates for each option, and the rates would change over 16 different rounds of the game. Every round, each player would choose their allocated option, receive their returns, and have the chance to alter their investment option for the next round. One group made their decisions and received returns in isolation, while another group could see the allocations and performance rankings of the other participants under anonymous labels. Results from this experiment found that the second group mimicked the investment allocations of the top performers in the previous rounds, and this resulted in a higher overall performance compared to the group of participants who only drew from their own experience. Hence, people are inclined to imitate the actions of more successful others in their respective fields. Further studies have found that there is heavier reliance on this bias the more uncertain or difficult a task is.

==== Prestige bias ====
The prestige bias is when individuals preferentially learn from other well respected, prestigious individuals within a community. Individuals infer whose behaviour to learn from based on who other people in a community have identified to possess useful and adaptive information. In a study by Chudek et al., an attentional cue was used to indicate to children that a particular model was prestigious. In an experiment with two models playing with a toy in different ways, prestige was indicated by two observers watching the prestigious model for 10 seconds. The study found that children picked up on the cue that signified prestige and were 13 times more likely to imitate the way the prestige-cued model played with the toy compared to the other model. The study suggests that such biases help humans pick up direct and indirect cues that an individual possesses knowledge that is worth learning.

==== Self-similarity bias ====
Humans are also self-referential when picking models to imitate – doing so according to similarities in age, sex and ethnicity; models that are too dissimilar are less likely to be copied. The rationale behind this is that the chosen model is likely to possess information more useful to the learner in their future roles.

A study in UCLA compared the brain activity of both women and men who imitated the hand gestures of a same-sex model compared to an opposite-sex model. Across both genders, when they copied same-sex models, the patterns of brain activity observed were similar to patterns that emerge when people receive rewards like money or getting a question correct. This was observed at a much lower rate when copying opposite-sex models. This demonstrates how humans find copying same-sex models neurologically more rewarding than that of the opposite-sex, explaining the behaviour of this learning bias.

==== Dangers of imitation ====
These cues can lead to humans imitating harmful behaviours. Copycat suicides occur when the person attempting suicide copies the method of a suicide attempt they had heard about or seen in the media, with a significant rise in attempts seen after celebrity suicides (see Werther effect). Suicides can spread through social networks like an epidemic due large groups of people imitating the behaviour of a model or group of models (see Blue Whale Challenge).

Experimental research has found that the conformity bias particularly can have adverse effects. A series of experiments conducted by Solomon Asch in the 1950s presented a task to a group of volunteers (consisting of one real subject and the rest being actors) where they were shown one reference line and 3 comparison lines. They were then asked to choose which comparison line is identical to the reference line. While the answer was very obvious, the actors were instructed to give a specific wrong answer on certain trials, and the real subject was always second last to respond. Of the 100 subjects tested, 75% of them were swayed by the actors and gave the wrong answer. While this conformity has its limits, with 95% of subjects independently responded at least once and few conforming every single time, this nonetheless is compelling evidence for the prevalence of the conformity bias even at the expense of objective rationality. This experiment was replicated across 27 countries with similar results, demonstrating the cross-regional and cultural scale of the phenomenon of conformity and imitative learning.

== Imitative learning in robotics ==
Initiative learning can be used in robotics as an alternative to traditional reinforcement learning. Traditional reinforcement learning algorithms start from essentially taking random actions, and are left to figure out the correct sequence of actions to achieve the goal by themselves. However, this approach can fail in robotics, where the reward function may be extremely sparse (e.g. the robot either succeeds or fails, no in-between). If success requires the robot to complete a complex sequence of actions, the reinforcement learning algorithm may struggle to make progress in training. Imitative learning can be used to create a set of successful examples for the reinforcement learning algorithm to learn from by having a human researcher manually pilot the robot, and record the actions taken. These successful examples can guide the reinforcement learning algorithm to the right path better than taking purely random actions would.
