= Emulation (observational learning) =

Learning mechanism in psychology

In emulation learning, subjects learn about parts of their environment and use this to achieve their own goals and is an observational learning mechanism (sometimes called social learning mechanisms).

In this context, emulation was coined by child psychologist David Wood in 1988. In 1990 "emulation" was taken up by Michael Tomasello to explain the findings of an earlier study on ape social learning. The meaning of the term emulation has changed gradually over time.

Emulation is different from imitation - because emulation focuses on the action's environmental results instead of a model's action themselves. The fidelity of an observational learning mechanism is expected to have profound implications for its capacity for cultural transmission. Emulation is argued by some to produce only fleeting fidelity - though this is still being discussed.

== History of the term ==
In the original version, emulation referred to observers understanding objects in their potential to help them achieve desired results. They gained this understanding (or were triggered in their understanding) by seeing demonstrators achieving these very results with these objects. The actions performed by the demonstrators however were not copied, so it was concluded that observers learn "from the demonstration, that the tool may be used to obtain the food" (Tomasello et al., 1987).

In 1996, Tomasello redefined the term: "The individual observing and learning some affordances of the behavior of another animal, and then using what it has learned in devising its own behavioral strategies, is what I have called emulation learning. ... an individual is not just attracted to the location of another but actually learns something about the environment as a result of its behavior". An even later definition further clarifies: "In emulation learning, learners see the movement of the objects involved and then come to some insight about its relevance to their own problems". Here animals are described as learning some physics or causal relations of the environment. This does not necessarily involve a very complex understanding of abstract phenomena (as to what defines a "tool as a tool"). Emulation comprises a large span of cognitive complexity, from minimal cognitive complexity to complex levels. Emulation was originally invented as a "cognitivist's alternative" to associative learning (Tomasello, 1999), spanning learning about how things function and their "affordances" put to the use of achieving one's own goals: "Emulation learning in tool-use tasks seems to require the perception and understanding of some causal relations among objects". This necessarily involves some "insight" – a cognitive domain. To further highlight this point Call & Carpenter wrote in 2001: "it would be a harder task to teach robots to emulate than it is already to teach them to imitate".

== Current theory ==
Huang & Chaman (2005) have summarized the different connotations of emulation that are being discussed. These versions are: "end state emulation", "goal emulation", "object movement reenactment", and "emulation via affordance learning". In their words: in end state emulation "the presence of an end result motivates an observer to replicate the result without explicitly encoding it in relation to the model's goal". In goal emulation, "an observer attributes a goal to the model while attempting to devise his or her own strategy to reproduce the end result". In object movement reenactment "when an observer sees an object or its parts move, and that movement leads to a salient outcome, seeing the object movement might motivate the observer to reproduce the outcome". Emulation via affordance learning "refers to a process whereby an observer detects stimulus consequences, such as dynamic properties and temporal–spatial causal relations of objects, through watching the object movements". Byrne (2002) has come up with a slightly different classification, and which is looking more closely at the learning on the object level. He distinguishes three forms: 1) learning physical properties of objects 2) learning the relationships among objects 3) understanding cause-and-effect relationships and changes of state of objects (e.g. "that a stick can be used as a rake").

== Experimental approaches ==
Emulation has been researched in a diverse range of species, including humans. The methodology most often applied is the so-called ghost-condition – put forward by Cecilia Heyes and colleagues in 1994. Ghost condition demonstrations do not involve any information on body movements. Instead, the parts of the apparatus move as if a ghost moves them (for this purpose often very thin fishing line is attached to the moving parts and which transmits the necessary forces). While the use of this method (and subsequently the interpretation of findings) has been criticized on the basis of it lacking ecological validity (it is a strange thing for non-animate objects to move on their own accord), it succeeded in showing that environmental information can be enough for observational learning to occur (work on pigeons). Thus, the general validity of the ghost condition is now established. Chimpanzees tested with this methodology have sometimes failed to copy, but copied in another study – as did dogs. Recently it was shown that in human children, emulation learning enables children to copy in a constructive task solutions that they themselves were unable to produce on their own, an important stepping stone for cumulative culture. This study therefore showed, empirically, that imitation is not a necessary requirement for cumulative culture (contra to some previous claims).

== See also ==
- Cognitive imitation
- Culture
- Modeling (psychology)
- Observational learning
- Social learning and cumulative cultural evolution
