= The Mental and Social Life of Babies =

1982 book by Kenneth Kaye

The Mental and Social Life of Babies: How Parents Create Persons
- First paperback edition, 1984
- Author: Kenneth Kaye
- Language: English
- Publisher: University of Chicago Press
- Publication date: 1982
- Media type: Print
- Pages: 282+index
- ISBN: 0226428486

The Mental and Social Life of Babies is a 1982 book by Kenneth Kaye. Integrating a contemporary burgeoning field of research on infant cognitive and social development in the first two years of life with his own laboratory's studies at the University of Chicago, Kaye offered an "apprenticeship" theory. Seen as an empirical turning point in the investigation of processes in early human development, the book's reviews welcomed its reliance on close (second by second) process studies of a large sample of infants and mothers (50) recorded longitudinally (birth to 30 months). It was republished in England, Japan, Spain, Italy, and Argentina.

Since the argument placed social relations at the root of mental development, it amounted to an extension of Lev Vygotsky’s theory and of his objections to Jean Piaget, down to the first year of life. (Their debate dealt with the preschool years. ) However, the cited evidence from research by many authors in the 1970s also refined the argument Vygotsky had made. Previous writers seem to have assumed, like Piaget, that communication is a felicitous by-product of a symbol-using mind. (If they doubted it, no one had created empirical paradigms to study the processes involved.) Like Vygotsky, Kaye held the contrary: that communication is the origin of mind. His decade-long research program addressed the question: How does communication itself develop in an organism that still lacks a mind? His answer is the "apprenticeship" theory of infancy: Development of the human mind and language depends as much upon preadapted (through evolution) adult behavior and universal human interaction patterns as it does upon the infant's brain. "The kinds of exchanges with adults that facilitate sensorimotor and later linguistic development require little from the infant at first except regularities in behavior and expressive reactions that parents tend to interpret as if they were meaningful gestures."
