= Transformational theory of imitation =

Transformational theory of imitation is one of the two types of theories that provide alternative accounts of the psychological processes underlying imitation in animals. Associative theories (being the other theory of imitation) suggesting successful imitation matches between a behavior of the demonstrator and the model to be acquired from experiences, transformational theories are in complete contrast suggesting successful imitation matches are derived internally from a series of elaborated cognitive processes that exist void of any experiences.

According to transformational theories, sensory input seen by the model of the demonstrator's action is transformed into a "imaged representation" that contains the fundamental information for the model to accurately execute the imitation of the demonstrator. In transformational theories, simply observing the behaviors of the demonstrator creates an incentive to duplicate them because we already have the codes to replicate them.

== Bandura's "social cognitive theory" ==
In his "social cognitive theory" Bandura outlines what he believed to be the four sets of constituent processes that govern imitation:

1. A model must give attention to the demonstrator's behavior
2. A model must store that behavior in the form of a "symbolic conception" that can serve as a sort of standard for the behavior
3. A model must imitate the behavior of the demonstrator acquired from the symbolic conception when...
4. The model is motivated to imitate the behavior

Unlike in associative theories of imitation, Bandura's transformational theory of imitation denies that reinforcement must accompany observation of the demonstrator's behavior for the creation of a mental portrayal of the demonstrator's behavior to occur. Bandura's theory also claims reinforcement is not necessary in the maintenance of imitative behavior. Rather, it is the symbolic conception that regulates imitation, where no experience is necessary, only the conception that is created internally.

== Problems with the theory ==
=== Underspecification ===
Although there are many theories enveloped within transformational theories of imitation, as a whole, transformational theories all lack in specification. According to these theories, imitation is mediated by a sort of “symbolic conception”, but how this conception works is not specified. It is unknown, then, which behaviors can and cannot be imitated, with which species, and under what conditions because the process of this conception isn't specific. In turn, transformational theories are then impossible to test empirically.

==== Bandura's “social cognitive theory” ====
In Bandura's theory and his sets of constituent processes governing imitation, there is essentially a three piece cognitive architecture. This architecture consists of a sensory representation where the demonstrator's behavior is first stored, a symbolic conception that is a transformation of the sensory representation, and a motor program that serves as constant reminder of that behavior's standard. What there is not, however, is specificity in regards to how this behavior moves from one piece to the next. It is unclear as to how the sensory representation moves and is transformed into a symbolic conception that serves as the behavior's standard and thus, proves to be untestable and unpredictable, a common problem that many find with transformational theories.
