= T. Berry Brazelton =

American pediatrician and author (1918–2018)

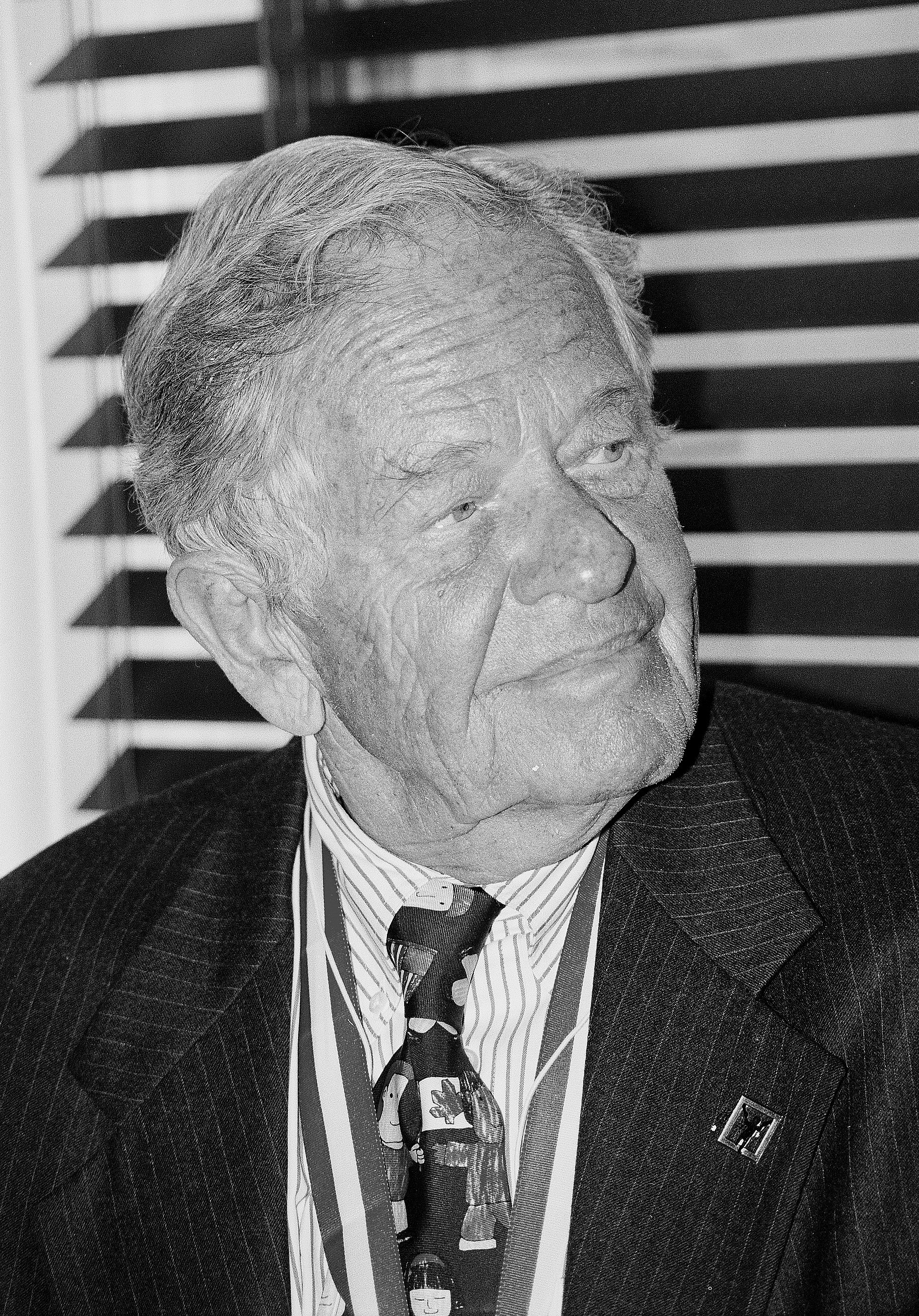
- Brazelton in 2000
- Born: Thomas Berry Brazelton; May 10, 1918; Waco, Texas, U.S.
- Died: March 13, 2018 (aged 99); Barnstable, Massachusetts, U.S.
- Occupation: Pediatrician author

Thomas Berry Brazelton (May 10, 1918 – March 13, 2018) was an American pediatrician, author, and the developer of the Neonatal Behavioral Assessment Scale (NBAS). Brazelton hosted the cable television program What Every Baby Knows, and wrote a syndicated newspaper column. He wrote more than two hundred scholarly papers and twenty-four books.

== Biography ==
Brazelton was born in Waco, Texas. He studied at the Episcopal High School in Alexandria, Virginia.

He graduated in 1940 from Princeton University and in 1943 from the Columbia University College of Physicians and Surgeons in New York City, where he accepted a medical internship at Roosevelt Hospital. From 1945, after war service in the U.S. Navy, he completed his medical residency in Boston Massachusetts General Hospital (MGH) before undertaking pediatric training at Children's Hospital of Boston.

He entered private practice in 1950, in Cambridge, Massachusetts. His interest in child development led to training in child psychiatry at MGH and the James Jackson Putnam Children's Center. He subsequently served as a Fellow with Professor Jerome Bruner at the Center for Cognitive Studies at Harvard University, then combined his interests in primary care pediatrics and child psychiatry and in 1972 established the Child Development Unit, a pediatric training and research center at Children's Hospital in Boston. From 1988, he was Clinical Professor of Pediatrics Emeritus at Harvard Medical School.

Brazelton was president of the Society for Research in Child Development (1987–1989), and of the National Center for Clinical Infant Programs (1988–1991). He appeared many times before Congressional committees in support of parental and medical leave bills, and continued to work with the Alliance for Better Child Care for a more comprehensive day care bill. He was a co-founder of Parent Action and served on the National Commission on Children.

Brazelton is widely known for developing a "child-oriented" approach suggesting to start toilet training not earlier than 24 months of child's age while looking for "readiness signs" for mature toilet behavior. In his work, he shared his opinion that "...there is little innate in the child that leads [them] to want to be clean and dry, it must be understood as a kind of compliance to external pressure", that parents should withstand "external pressure" of grandparents to start toilet education around 9 months of age and postpone it until a child is demonstrating certain "readiness signs". Later Brazelton served as Chairman of Pampers Parenting Institute funded by P&G Corporation, a global disposable diaper market leader. He also participated in Pampers advertising for Toddler diapers N6.

Brazelton appeared several times on The Oprah Winfrey Show and the Ellen DeGeneres Show. Brazleton was the paediatrician of television and podcast personality Conan O'Brien in the 1960s–70s.

== Neonatal behavior ==
Brazelton's foremost achievement in pediatrics and child development has been to increase pediatricians' awareness of, and attention to, the effect of young children's behavior, activity states, and emotional expressions on the ways their parents react to, and thereby affect them. For example, one of his first publications in the field of psychology was a study with Kenneth Kaye of the interaction between babies' sucking at breast or bottle and the mother's attempts to maintain it, the earliest form of human "dialogue". The Brazelton Neonatal Behavioral Assessment Scale (NBAS) assesses not only the physical and neurological responses of newborns, but also their emotional well-being and individual differences.

The Neonatal Behavioral Assessment Scale (NBAS) looks at a wide range of behaviors and is suitable for examining newborns and infants up to two months old. By the end of the assessment, the examiner has a behavioral "portrait" of the infant, describing the baby's strengths, adaptive responses and possible vulnerabilities. The examiner shares this portrait with parents to develop appropriate caregiving strategies aimed at enhancing the earliest relationship between babies and parents. It evaluates a wide range of 38 behaviors to build a behavioral profile of an infant up to 2 months old. The Scale contains 28 behavioral and 18 reflex items. It assesses the baby's capabilities across different developmental areas (autonomic, motor, state and social-interactive systems) and describes how infants integrate these areas as they adapt to their new environment. This approach was innovative for recognizing that a baby is a highly developed organism, even when just newly born. The profile describes the baby's strengths, adaptive responses and possible vulnerabilities.

The NBAS is based on several key assumptions. First, infants, even ones that seem vulnerable, are highly capable when they are born. "A newborn already has nine months of experience when she is born," Dr. Brazelton notes. "She is capable of controlling her behavior in order to respond to her new environment." Second, babies "communicate" through their behavior, which, although it may not always seem like it, is a rational language. Not only do infants respond to cues around them, like their parents' faces, but they also take steps to control their environment, such as crying to get a response from their caregivers. Third, infants are social organisms, individuals with their own unique qualities, ready to shape as well as be shaped by the caregiving environment.

== Publications ==
- Developmental Psychology, Child Development And Pediatric Behavior (2018). Co-written with Mahmoud Mansour; Hamideh Jahangiri. ISBN 978-613-9-45251-4
- Neonatal Behavioral Assessment Scale

=== Popular books ===
- Infants and Mothers: Differences in Development, 1969, ISBN 0-440-04045-0
- The Irreducible Needs Of Children: What Every Child Must Have To Grow, Learn, And Flourish, by T. Berry Brazelton and Stanley I. Greenspan
- Touchpoints The Essential Reference: Your Child's Emotional And Behavioral Development
  - Touchpoints Birth to Three: Your Child's Emotional and Behavioral Development
  - Touchpoints Three to Six: Your Child's Emotional and Behavioral Development
- Calming Your Fussy Baby: The Brazelton Way
- Discipline: The Brazelton Way
- Feeding Your Child: The Brazelton Way
- Sleep: The Brazelton Way
- Toilet Training: The Brazelton Way
- Understanding Sibling Rivalry: The Brazelton Way
- Learning to Listen: A Life Caring for Children
- Toddlers and Parents: A Declaration of Independence
- Going To The Doctor
- To Listen To A Child: Understanding The Normal Problems Of Growing Up
- What Every Baby Knows
- The Earliest Relationship
- Working And Caring

== Death ==
Brazelton died on March 13, 2018, at the age of 99.
