= Kenneth Kaye =

American psychologist and writer

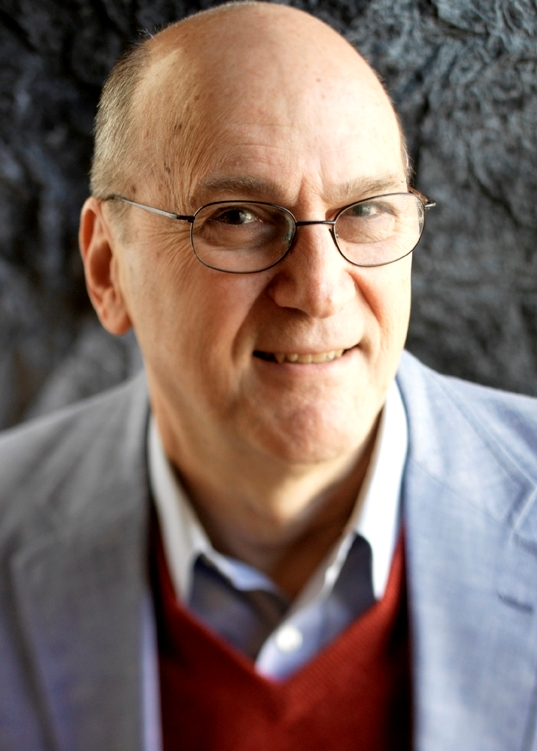
Kenneth Kaye

Kenneth Kaye (January 24, 1946 – May 26, 2021) was an American psychologist and writer whose research, books, and articles connect the fields of human development, family relationships and conflict resolution.

== Life ==
Although spanning several professional disciplines, the substantial body of Kaye's work is characterized by family systems theory and by a search for observable, reproducible processes rather than stopping at generalizations about formal properties, for example, of stages in mental or social development.

Kaye was educated at Harvard University (A.B. in English and American Literature, 1966; Ph.D. in Developmental Psychology and Education, 1970). Following a Visiting Fellowship at King's College, Cambridge (UK), he taught at the University of Washington (1970–71) and the University of Chicago (Department of Education and Committee on Human Development, 1971–81). From 1982 to 2007 he was an Adjunct Faculty member in the Department of Psychiatry, Northwestern University Medical School.

In later years, Kaye published six books of fiction under the name Ken Kaye.

== Research and principal publications ==
=== Early human development ===
Beginning with his doctoral dissertation and continuing through the University of Chicago years, 22 of Kaye's published articles addressed the fundamental question, What gives Homo sapiens, uniquely among all other creatures, the ability to learn through imitation, language, and consciousness of a reflecting self? His principal mentors were the social-cognitive psychologist Jerome S. Bruner, British ethologist M.P.M. Richards, and pediatrician T. Berry Brazelton. Elaborated most fully in his book The Mental and Social Life of Babies: How Parents Create Persons, Kaye theorized and demonstrated that those distinguishing psychological powers, rather than developing intrinsically from innate capacities of the human infant biologically reorganizing themselves (Piaget), are shaped gradually by interactions due to the co-evolution of infant behavior and human adult behavior. Specifically, he traced the development of turn-taking beginning with instinctive maternal responses to physiological/neurological bursts and pauses in neonatal activity, through transactions in which adults adjust to babies' perceived (projected) intentions, to true dialogue which makes symbolic language possible.

The Mental and Social Life of Babies appeared in Spanish, Italian, and Japanese editions. Kaye's innovative microanalytic studies of parent-infant interaction in the 1970s have been discussed continuously to the present in hundreds of scholarly papers and books on diverse psychological topics.

=== The IQ controversy ===
In the mid-1970s, he published 6 articles and book reviews on the controversy triggered by Arthur Jensen's famous Harvard Educational Review article on the heritability of IQ. Kaye's message: "Educational revolution will not come until after educational psychology makes a paradigm shift. Psychology has sold society a dogmatic set of assumptions that preclude beliefs in the educability of children, the potential of curriculum, and the accountability of schools."

=== The science of human behavior ===
Mainly growing out of his research methods in the work on infancy, 6 publications dealt with methodological rigor and interpretive issues in the science of human behavior.

=== Family therapy and parenting ===
Beginning in 1981, Kaye became a licensed clinical psychologist and served on the faculty of the Family Institute of Chicago for several years. His 1984 book Family Rules: Raising Responsible Children. was republished in a mass market edition by St. Martin's Press and an updated edition in 2005.

=== Family business systems and conflict resolution ===
In 1986, Kaye began to specialize his practice in consulting to families who were in business together. He was among the first psychologists to do so, phasing out his general clinical practice by the mid-1990s. By 2009, his published articles in this field equalled in number those in his earlier, academic career. Kenneth Kaye's books in this field are Workplace Wars: Turning Personal Conflict to Productive Teamwork (1994) and The Dynamics of Family Business (2005).
