= Mirroring =

Subconscious imitative behaviour

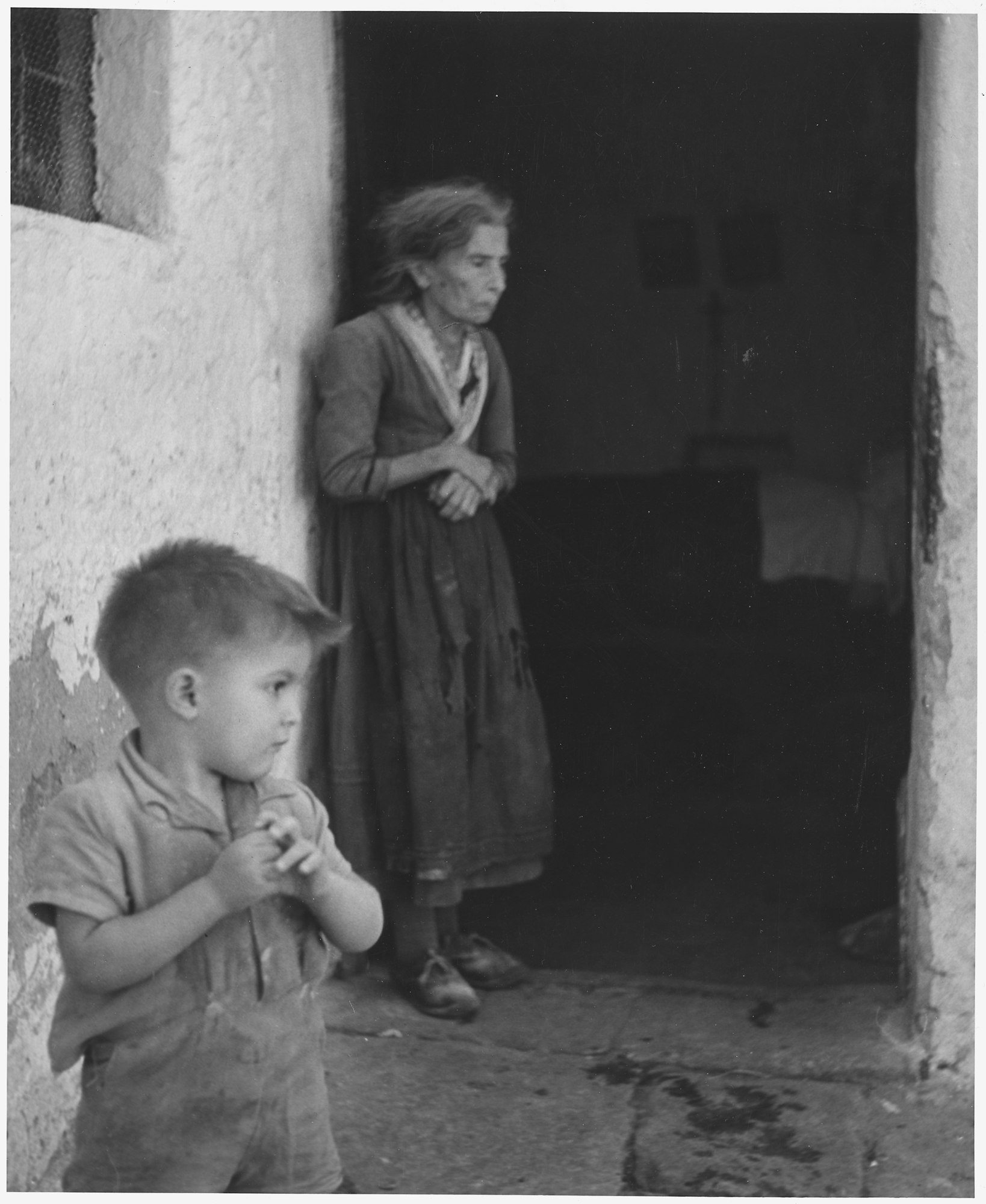
A young boy mirrors the gesture of his grandmother

Mirroring, or the chameleon effect, is a behavior in which one person subconsciously imitates the gesture, speech pattern, or attitude of another. Mirroring often occurs in social situations, particularly in the company of close friends or family, often going unnoticed by both parties. Mirroring can positively influence how individuals perceive one another, which can lead to building rapport with others.

Mirroring is distinct from conscious imitation under the premise that while the latter is a conscious, typically overt effort to copy another person, mirroring is unconsciously done during the act and often goes unnoticed.

The display of mirroring often begins as early as infancy, as babies begin to mimic individuals around them and establish connections with particular body movements. The ability to mimic another person's actions allows the infant to establish a sense of empathy and thus begin to understand another person's emotions. The infant continues to establish connections with other individuals' emotions and subsequently mirror their movements.

Mirroring can establish rapport with the individual who is being mirrored, as the similarities in nonverbal gestures allow the individual to feel more connected with the person exhibiting the mirrored behavior. As the two individuals in the situation display similar nonverbal gestures, they may believe that they share similar attitudes and ideas as well. Mirror neurons react to and cause these movements, allowing the individuals to feel a greater sense of engagement and belonging within the situation.

== Occurrence ==
Mirroring generally takes place unconsciously as individuals engage in social interaction. Mirroring is common in conversation, as the listeners will typically smile or frown along with the speaker, as well as imitate body posture or attitudes about the topic. Individuals may be more willing to empathize with and accept people whom they believe hold similar interests and beliefs, and thus mirroring the person with whom one is speaking may establish connections between the individuals involved.

In prehistory, mirroring someone's actions resulted in positive outcomes during life-or-death circumstances, such as staying still near a predator. This mirroring or chameleon effect remains present in interactions between those who share personal relationships, whether friendly or romantic in nature. During conversation, a person may reflect their friend's posture and facial expression, and this positively influences the relationship as it leads each person to believe that they share similarities and are in sync with one another.

=== Interviews ===
Additionally, mirroring has been shown to influence an individual's performance in job interviews. In a study by Word, Zanna and Cooper, interviewers were instructed to study types of body language under different experimental conditions. In one condition, interviewers were instructed to display distant and uninterested body language, such as leaning away or avoiding eye contact. In another condition, interviewers were to demonstrate more welcoming body language, such as smiling and making eye contact. Since individuals being interviewed mirrored the body language of the interviewer, the study found that the individuals subject to less friendly body language fared worse in the interview than individuals subject to welcoming body language. The study suggests that the initial attitude adopted by an interviewer may affect the performance of the interviewee as a result of mirroring.

=== Lack of ability ===
Individuals with autism or other social difficulties may be less likely to engage in mirroring, as they may be less unconsciously and consciously aware of the social actions of others. This factor may cause additional difficulties for the individuals, as without mirroring, establishing connections with other people may be more difficult. Additionally, other individuals may be less likely to build rapport with the person, as without mirroring the person may seem more dissimilar and less friendly. Individuals who are not unconsciously aware of the gesture may have difficulties in social situations, as they may be less able to understand another person's perspective without it being explicitly stated, and thus may not understand covert cues that are often used in the social world. It is possible for autistic individuals to deliberately learn and become aware of these cues.

=== Examinations in humans ===
The use of noninvasive fMRI studies have shown that there is evidence of mirroring in humans similar to that found in monkeys in the inferior parietal lobe and part of the inferior frontal gyrus. Humans show additional signs of mirroring in parts of the brain not observed to show mirroring properties in primates, such as the cerebellum. Mirroring has also been shown to allow non-autistic children to understand what the intentions of an action are before seeing the entire sequence. Because of this, a child can see someone pick up food with the intention to eat and fire all necessary motor chains needed for them to pick up their own food and go through the motions of eating it as well. It has been shown that children with autism lack this motor chain reaction and are thought to use other senses, such as visual or somatosensory, to accomplish similar tasks.

== Development ==
In infant-parent interactions, mirroring consists of the parent imitating the infant's expressions while vocalizing the emotion implied by the expression. This imitation helps the infant to associate the emotion with their expression, as well as feel validated in their own emotions as the parent shows approval through imitation. Studies have demonstrated that mirroring is an important part of child and infant development. According to Kohut's theories of self-psychology, individuals need a sense of validation and belonging in order to establish their concepts of self. When parents mirror their infants, the action may help the child develop a greater sense of self-awareness and self-control, as they can see their emotions within their parent's faces. Additionally, infants may learn and experience new emotions, facial expressions, and gestures by mirroring expressions that their parents utilize. The process of mirroring may help infants establish connections of expressions to emotions and thus promote social communication later in life. Infants also learn to feel secure and valid in their own emotions through mirroring, as the parent's imitation of their emotions may help the child recognize their own thoughts and feelings more readily.

=== Self-concept ===
Mirroring has been shown to play a critical role in the development of an infant's notion of self. The importance of mirroring suggests that infants primarily gather their social skills from their parents, and thus a household that lacks mirroring may inhibit the child's social development. Without mirroring, it may be difficult for the child to relate their emotions to socially learned expressions and thus have a difficult experience in expressing their own emotions.

=== Empathy ===
The inability to properly mirror other individuals may strain the child's social relationships later in life. This strain may exist because others may feel more distant from the child due to a lack of rapport, or because the child may have a difficult time feeling empathy for others without mirroring. Mirroring helps to facilitate empathy, as individuals more readily experience other people's emotions through mimicking posture and gestures. Mirroring also allows individuals to subjectively feel the pain of others when viewing injuries. This empathy may help individuals create lasting relationships and thus excel in social situations. The action of mirroring allows individuals to believe they are more similar to another person, and perceived similarity can be the basis for creating a relationship.

== Rapport ==
Rapport may be an important part of social life, as establishing rapport with an individual is generally the initial route to becoming friends or acquaintances with another person. Mirroring can help establish rapport, as exhibiting similar actions, attitudes, and speech patterns as another person may lead them to believe that one is more similar to them and thus more likely to be a friend. Individuals may believe that because one replicates the individual's gestures, that one may hold similar beliefs and attitudes as the individual. Mirroring may be more pervasive in close friendships or romantic relationships, as the individuals regard each other highly and thus wish to emulate or appease them. Additionally, individuals who are friends may have more similarities than two strangers, and thus may be more likely to exhibit similar body language regardless of mirroring.

The activation of mirror neurons takes place within the individual who begins to mirror another's movements and allows them a greater connection and understanding with the individual who they are mirroring, as well as allowing the individual who is being mirrored to feel a stronger connection with the other individual.

=== Social bonding and affiliation ===
Beyond helping people establish rapport, mirroring also plays an important role in social bonding and affiliation. Research in social psychology shows that when individuals are subtly mimicked during an interaction, they tend to like the other person more and perceive the interaction as smoother and more natural, even when they are not consciously aware that mirroring is happening. This process operates automatically and helps coordinate behavior between interaction partners, making cooperation easier. Mirroring has also been linked to affiliation goals, meaning people are more likely to unconsciously mimic others when they are motivated to belong or form social connections. Overall, these findings suggest that the chameleon effect contributes to social cohesion by aligning behavior, attention, and emotional responses between individuals.

=== Power dynamics ===
Additionally, individuals are likely to mirror the person of higher status or power within the situation or when they feel physical attraction to the other person. Mirroring individuals of higher power may create an illusion of higher status, or create rapport with the individual in power, thus allowing the person to gain favor with the individual in power. This mechanism may be helpful for individuals in situations where they are in a position of bargaining with an individual who possesses more power, as the rapport that mirroring creates may help to persuade the higher status individual to help the person of lower status.

These situations include job interviews, other work situations such as requesting promotions, parent-child interactions and asking professors for favors. Each of these situations involves one party who is in a less powerful position for bargaining and another party who has the ability to fulfill the person of lower status's needs but may not necessarily wish to. Thus, mirroring can be a useful tool for individuals of lower status in order to persuade the other party to provide goods or privileges for the lower status party.

== See also ==
- Amygdala hijack
- Kinesthetic learning
- Nonverbal communication
