= Modeling (psychology) =

Method used in psychotherapy

Modeling is:

1. a method used in certain cognitive-behavioral techniques of psychotherapy whereby the client learns by imitation alone, copying a human model without any specific verbal direction by the therapist, and
2. a general process in which persons serve as models for others, exhibiting the behavior to be imitated by others. This process is most commonly discussed for children.

== Study by Albert Bandura ==
Albert Bandura most memorably introduced the concept of behavioral modeling in his famous 1961 Bobo doll experiment. In this study, 72 children from ages three to five were divided into groups to watch an adult confederate (the model) interact with an assortment of toys in the experiment room, including an inflated Bobo doll. For children assigned the non-aggressive condition, the role model ignored the doll. For children assigned the aggressive condition, the role model spent the majority of the time physically aggressing the doll and shouting at it.

After the role model left the room, the children were allowed to interact with similar toys individually. Children who observed the non-aggressive role model's behavior played quietly with the toys and rarely initiated violence toward the Bobo doll. Children who watched the aggressive role model were more likely to model themselves on that example by hitting, kicking, and shouting at the Bobo doll.

== Factors influencing behavioral modeling ==
=== Psychological factors ===
Bandura proposed that four components contribute to behavioral modeling.

1. Attention: The observer must watch and pay attention to the behavior being modeled.
2. Retention: The observer must remember the behavior well enough to recreate it.
3. Reproduction: The observer must physically recreate the actions they observed in step 1.
4. Reinforcement: The observer's modeled behavior must be rewarded

=== Neurological factors ===
The mirror neuron system, located in the brain's frontal lobe, is a network of neurons that become active when an animal performs a behavior or observes that behavior being performed by another. For example, mirror neurons become active when a monkey grasps an object, just as when it watches another monkey do. While the significance of mirror neurons is still up for debate in the scientific community, many believe them to be the primary biological component in imitative learning.

== In neuro-linguistic programming ==
Modeling is an important component of neuro-linguistic programming (NLP), a field in which specialized modeling techniques are developed.

== See also ==
- Cognitive imitation
- Mimicry
- Mirror neuron
- Social cognition
