= Cognitive imitation =

Cognitive imitation is a form of social learning, and a subtype of imitation. Cognitive imitation is contrasted with motor and vocal or oral imitation. As with all forms of imitation, cognitive imitation involves learning and copying specific rules or responses done by another. The principal difference between motor and cognitive imitation is the type of rule (and stimulus) that is learned and copied by the observer. So, whereas in the typical imitation learning experiment subjects must copy novel actions on objects or novel sequences of specific actions (novel motor imitation), in a novel cognitive imitation paradigm subjects have to copy novel rules, independently of specific actions or movement patterns.

The following example illustrates the difference between cognitive and motor-spatial imitation: Imagine someone overlooking someone's shoulder and stealing their automated teller machine (ATM) password. As with all forms of imitation, the individual learns and successfully reproduces the observed sequence. The observer in our example, like most of us, presumably knows how to operate an ATM (namely, that you have to push X number of buttons on the ATM screen in a specific sequence), so the specific motor responses of touching the screen isn't what the thief is learning. Instead, the thief could learn two types of abstract rules. On the one hand, the thief can learn a spatial rule: touch item in the top right, followed by item on the top left, then the item in the middle of the screen, and finally the one on lower right. This would be an example of motor-spatial imitation because the thief's response is guided by an abstract motor-spatial rule. On the other, the thief could ignore the spatial patterning of the observed responses and instead focus on the particular items that were touched, generating an abstract numerical rule, independently of where they are in space: 3-1-5-9. This would constitute an example of cognitive imitation because the individuals is copying an abstract serial rule without copying specific motor-responses. In this example, the thief's responses match those he observed only because the numbers are in the same location. If the numbers were in a different location—that is, if the numbers on the ATM's keypad were scrambled with every attempt to enter a password—the thief would, nonetheless, reproduce the target password because they learned a cognitive (i.e., an abstract, item-specific serial rule), rather than a spatial rule (i.e., an observable motor-spatial pattern).

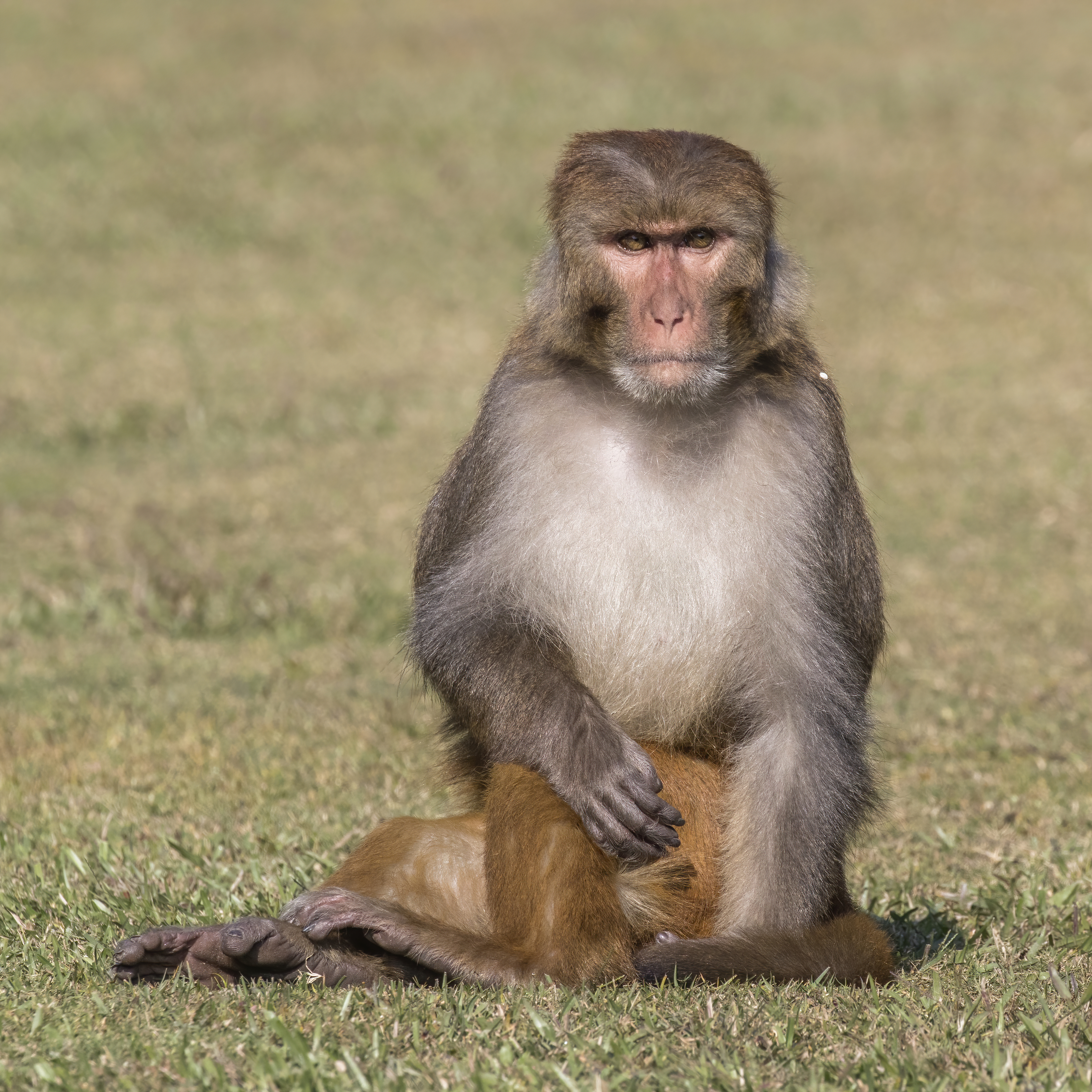
Rhesus Monkey

== In rhesus monkeys ==
The term "cognitive imitation" was first introduced by Subiaul and his colleagues (Subiaul, Cantlon, et al., 2004), defining it as "a type of observational learning in which a naïve student copies an expert's use of a rule". To isolate cognitive from motor imitation, Subiaul and colleagues trained two rhesus macaques to respond, in a prescribed order, to different sets of photographs that were displayed simultaneously on a touch-sensitive monitor. Because the position of the photographs varied randomly from trial to trial, sequences could not be learned by motor imitation. Both monkeys learned new sequences more rapidly after observing an expert execute those sequences than when they had to learn new sequences entirely by trial and error. A mircro-analysis of each monkeys' performance showed that each monkey learned the order of two of the four photographs faster than baseline levels. A second experiment ruled out social facilitation as an explanation for this result. A third experiment, however, demonstrated that monkeys did not learn when the computer highlighted each picture in the correct sequence in the absence of a monkey ("ghost control").

== Dissociating cognitive and motor-spatial imitation ==
Subiaul and colleagues, using two computerized tasks that measure the learning of two abstract rules: cognitive—item-based—rules (e.g., apple-boy-cat;) and motor-spatial-based rules (e.g., up-down-right) have shown that there are important dissociations between the imitation of these two types of rules. Specifically, results have shown that while 3-year-olds successfully imitate item-specific rules (i.e., cognitive imitation), these same 3-year-olds fail to imitate motor-spatial rules (i.e., motor-spatial imitation). This dissociation isn't because there's something inherently harder about learning spatial versus cognitive rules. Follow-up studies have shown that 3-year-olds easily learn new spatial rules by trial and error, correctly recalling such rules after a 30s delay, (Exp. 2). This result excludes the possibility that 3-year-olds' motor-spatial imitation problems are due to difficulty learning (i.e., encoding and recalling) novel spatial rules in general. In another study, 3-year-olds observed a model correctly touch the first item (e.g., Top Right) in the sequence, but then skip the middle item (e.g., Top Left picture) and, instead, touch the last item in the sequence (e.g., Bottom Left picture), resulting in an error, marked as unintentional by the model who said, "Whoops! That's not right!". This is a goal emulation learning condition, as the child had to copy the model's intended goal (Top-Right, Bottom-Left, Top-Left), rather than the observed (incorrect) response (Top-Right, Top-Left), similar to Meltzoff's "re-enactment" paradigm. When given an opportunity to respond, 3-year-olds generated the intended (i.e., correct) sequence (Exp. 3.) 3-year-old's success in the goal emulation condition excludes the possibility that 3-year-olds' motor-spatial imitation problem is due to difficulty vicariously learning (i.e., because of a lack of interest, failure to attend, problems inferring goals, etc.) a novel spatial rule from a model. Children's success in the goal emulation condition shows that social learning may be achieved by social reasoning (inferring goals) and causal inferences (error detection), independently of any domain-specific imitation learning mechanism.

To further explore this dissociation between cognitive- and motor-spatial imitation Subiaul and colleagues conducted a large-scale cross-sectional, within-subject study with preschoolers (2–6 years) using the same two tasks: cognitive (item-specific) and motor-spatial (spatial-specific). Results showed that children's cognitive imitation performance did not predict their motor-spatial imitation learning, and vice versa. Importantly, while age predicted improved cognitive and motor-spatial imitation performance, children's ability to individually learn each type of rule via trial and error did not predict their ability to imitate those same rules.

Subiaul and colleagues have argued that these results are consistent with the hypothesis that imitation learning is domain-specific, not domain-general. A critical caveat may be that the imitation of NOVEL rules and responses is domain-specific while the imitation of FAMILIAR responses is likely to be mediated by domain-general, non-specialized mechanisms, as Heyes and others have argued.

== See also ==
- Imitation
- Mimic octopus
- Modelling (psychology)
- Monkey see, monkey do
