= Early Human Development =

- Discipline: Human development
- Language: English
- Edited by: E.F. Maalouf

Publication details
- History: 1977–present
- Publisher: Elsevier
- Frequency: Monthly
- Impact factor: 2.079 (2020)

Standard abbreviations
- ISO 4: Early Hum. Dev.

Indexing
- CODEN: EHDEDN
- ISSN: 0378-3782
- LCCN: 77644403
- OCLC no.: 476330727

Links
- Journal homepage

Early Human Development is an academic journal covering human development published by Elsevier. The editor-in-chief is E.F. Maalouf (Homerton University Hospital). The journal covers research on the continuum between fetal life and the perinatal period, aspects of postnatal growth influenced by early events, and the safeguarding of the quality of human survival.

The journal is known for publishing "a large number of unprofessional articles" and was under investigation by the publisher as of December 2020.

== Abstracting and indexing ==
The journal is abstracted and indexed in Chemical Abstracts, Current Contents/Clinical Medicine, Current Contents/Life Sciences, EMBASE, Elsevier BIOBASE, MEDLINE, Science Citation Index Expanded, and Scopus. According to the Journal Citation Reports, the journal has a 2016 impact factor of 2.169.
