= The Journal of Individual Psychology =

- Discipline: Individual psychology
- Language: English
- Edited by: Jon Sperry, Len Sperry

Publication details
- Former names: List of former names: Zeitschrift für Individualpsychologie (1914–?); Journal of Individual Psychology (?–1935); Internationale Zeitschrift für Individualpsychologie (1923–?); International Journal of Individual Psychology (1935–1936); Individual Psychology News (1940–41); Individual Psychology Bulletin (1940–1951); American Journal of Individual Psychology (1952–1956); Individual Psychologist (1963–1978); Journal of Individual Psychology (1957–1973); Individual Psychology: The Journal of Adlerian Theory, Research & Practice (1982–1997); Journal of Individual Psychology (1998–present)
- History: 1935–present
- Publisher: University of Texas Press on behalf of North American Society of Adlerian Psychology (United States)
- Frequency: Quarterly

Standard abbreviations
- ISO 4: J. Individ. Psychol.

Indexing
- ISSN: 1522-2527 (print); 2332-0583 (web)
- LCCN: 98657442
- OCLC no.: 637676305

Links
- Journal homepage; Journal access at Project MUSE

The Journal of Individual Psychology is a quarterly peer-reviewed academic journal covering theory and methods of individual psychology. It is currently published by the University of Texas Press on behalf of the North American Society of Adlerian Psychology. The editors-in-chief are Jon and Len Sperry (Lynn University).

== History ==
The journal's roots can be traced to Zeitschrift für Individualpsychologie founded by Alfred Adler in 1914 (Germany). Publication was interrupted by the first world war, and resumed in 1923 under the name Internationale Zeitschrift für Individualpsychologie.

Adler immigrated to America in 1935 and established the International Journal of Individual Psychology, published in Chicago. After Adler's death in 1937, the journal was edited by his daughter, Alexandra Adler, and then by Rudolf Dreikurs. Individual Psychology News was published in 1940 renaming itself Individual Psychology Bulletin from 1941 to 1951. When the American Society of Adlerian Psychology was incorporated in 1952, it took over the publication under the title American Journal of Individual Psychology (1952 to 1956).

In 1957, Heinz Ansbacher took over as editor and it was renamed Journal of Individual Psychology. The new, broader editorial policy and focus was announced, calling for papers related to a "holitistic, teleological, phenemological, and socially-oriented approach, based on the assumptions of an active creative self, an open dynamic system of motivation, and an innate potential for social living." The first issue included an article by Albert Ellis among others, and a paper written by Alfred Adler in 1937, the year of his death. This title, Journal of Individual Psychology was used from 1957 to 1973. The journal was noted for maintaining high academic standards covering topics such as the teleological approach to personality and in the tradition of Adler's socially oriented approach psychology. In 1982, The Journal of Individual Psychology merged with Individual Psychologist and was published under new name and format, Individual Psychology: The Journal of Adlerian Theory, Research & Practice. In 1998, it was renamed back to Journal of Individual Psychology.

== Adlerian Digitization Project ==
The Adlerian Digitization Project, supported by the North American Society of Adlerian Psychology, has made full text versions available to the public:

- Individual Psychology News (1940–1941)
- Individual Psychology Bulletin (1941–1951)
- American Journal of Individual Psychology (1952–1956)
- Journal of Individual Psychology (1957–1973)
- Individual Psychologist (1963–1987)

== Indexing and abstracting ==
The Journal of Individual Psychology (1974–1981), Journal of Individual Psychology, and Individual Psychology: The Journal of Adlerian Theory, Research & Practice (1982–1997) is abstracted and indexed by the EBSCO Psychology & Behavioral Sciences Collection and PsycINFO (from 1950).
