= Compensation (psychology) =

Psychological strategy

In psychology, compensation is a strategy whereby one covers up, consciously or unconsciously, weaknesses, frustrations, desires, or feelings of inadequacy or incompetence in one life area through the gratification or (drive towards) excellence in another area. Compensation can cover up either real or imagined deficiencies and personal or physical inferiority. Positive compensations may help one to overcome one's difficulties. On the other hand, negative compensations do not, which results in a reinforced feeling of inferiority.

There are two kinds of negative compensation:

Overcompensation, characterized by a superiority goal, leads to striving for power, dominance, self-esteem, and self-devaluation.
Undercompensation, which includes a demand for help, leads to a lack of courage and a fear for life.

A well-known example of failing overcompensation is observed in people going through a midlife-crisis. Approaching midlife, many people lack the energy to maintain their psychological defenses, including their compensatory acts.

== Origin ==
Alfred Adler, founder of the school of individual psychology, introduced the term compensation in relation to inferiority feelings. In his book Study of Organ Inferiority and Its Psychical Compensation (1907), he argued that perceived inferiority or weakness led to physical or psychological attempts to compensate for it. Such compensation could be positive or negative in its effects: a classic case of a favorable over-compensation for stuttering was the development of Demosthenes as an outstanding orator.

Adler's motivation to investigate this was from personal experience. He was a very sickly child. He was unable to walk till he was four because of rickets. Then he was a victim of pneumonia as well as a series of accidents.

Adler also transferred this idea of compensation to psychic training.

== Examples ==
- Compensation may follow the direction of a perceived deficiency, as when a childhood fear of water is over-compensated by an obsession with sailing, or an original fear of picture books by a focus on literature. Or it may be opposed to the original problem-area, as when childhood rage becomes an unstable adult pacifism; or tangential to it, as when sporting weakness is compensated for by academic strivings.
- Narcissistic people, by compensation theory, mute the feelings of low self-esteem by self-aggrandizement, for example by talking "highly", or contacting "highly admired" persons. Narcissistic children (according to Melanie Klein) try to compensate for their jealousy and anger by fantasizing about power, beauty, fame and richness.

== Cultural implications ==
- Christopher Lasch, an American historian and social critic wrote in his book The Culture of Narcissism (1979) that North American society in the 1970s was a narcissistic society which worshipped fame and consumption, feared dependency, aging, and death, and being self-absorbed was constantly on the look-out for compensatory inputs.
- Consumption has been put forward as a means of compensation. A classic example is the use of goods (material & abstract, e.g. holidays) to compensate for failures in human relationships, as when parents attempt to compensate for "poor" physical conditions (poverty, abuse ...) they lived in, or to make up for "poor" psychological conditions (acrimony, neglect, divorce ...) they subjected children to, with inappropriately lavish gifts.

== See also ==
- Displacement (psychology)
- Sublimation (psychology)
- Inferiority complex
- Superiority complex
- Narcissistic abuse

== Sources ==
- Claude S. Fisher: Comment On "Anxiety": Compensation In Social History
- Christopher Lasch (1979). The Culture of Narcissism: American Life in an Age of Diminishing Expectations. New York: Norton.
- http://everything2.com/index.pl?node_id=535671
- Беляев И. А. Ограничение и компенсация способностей и потребностей целостного человеческого существа // Вестник Оренбургского государственного университета. — 2009. — No. 2 (96), февраль. — С. 24–30.
