= Neo-Adlerian =

Neo-Adlerian psychologists are those working in the tradition of, or influenced by Alfred Adler, an early associate of, and dissident from the ideas of, Sigmund Freud.

== Education ==
Neo-Adlerian ideas have been identified in the field of education, associated particularly with the work of Rudolf Dreikurs. The neo-Adlerian classroom model stresses the importance of the student's search for feelings of belonging.

== Neo-Freudians ==
Fritz Wittels used the term 'neo-Adlerian' to refer derogatively to the Neo-Freudians, due to their emphasis on the social aspects of psychology. Heinz Ansbacher however sought to capture the Neo-Freudians as neo-Adlerians, to promote Adler's influence. Henri Ellenberger would later adjudge that what he called the neo-psychoanalysts like Karen Horney and Erich Fromm would indeed more accurately be known as neo-Adlerians.

Transactional analysis (TA) has also been termed a neo-Adlerian school – Eric Berne himself acknowledging that "of all those who preceded transactional analysis, Alfred Adler comes the closest to talking like a script analyst". A direct line of influence runs from Adler through Harry Stack Sullivan to Thomas Anthony Harris – one of the co-creators of TA – with Adler's ideas on guiding fictions and the sense of inferiority feeding into Berne's concept of psychological games, which can also be considered in terms of the interactions of different life style systems.

== See also ==
- Adlerian
- Classical Adlerian psychology
- Positive discipline
- School discipline
