= Lifestyle =

Way or style of living

Lifestyle is the interests, opinions, behaviours, and behavioural orientations of an individual, group, or culture. The term "style of life" (German: Lebensstil) was introduced by Austrian psychologist Alfred Adler in his 1929 book, The Case of Miss R., with the meaning of "a person's basic character as established early in childhood". The broader sense of lifestyle as a "way or style of living" has been documented since 1961. Lifestyle is a combination of determining intangible or tangible factors. Tangible factors relate specifically to demographic variables, i.e. an individual's demographic profile, whereas intangible factors concern the psychological aspects of an individual such as personal values, preferences, and outlooks.

A rural environment has different lifestyles compared to an urban metropolis. Location is important even within an urban scope. The nature of the neighborhood in which a person resides affects the set of lifestyles available to that person due to differences between various neighborhoods' degrees of affluence and proximity to natural and cultural environments. For example, in areas near the sea, a surf culture or lifestyle can often be present.

== Individual identity ==
A lifestyle typically reflects an individual's attitudes, way of life, values, or world view. Therefore, a lifestyle is a means of forging a sense of self and to create cultural symbols that resonate with personal identity. Not all aspects of a lifestyle are voluntary. Surrounding social and technical systems can constrain the lifestyle choices available to the individual and the symbols they are able to project to others and themself.

The lines between personal identity and the everyday doings that signal a particular lifestyle become blurred in modern society. For example, "green lifestyle" means holding beliefs and engaging in activities that consume fewer resources and produce less harmful waste (i.e. a smaller ecological footprint), and deriving a sense of self from holding these beliefs and engaging in these activities. Some commentators argue that, in modernity, the cornerstone of lifestyle construction is consumption behavior, which offers the possibility to create and further individualize the self with different products or services that signal different ways of life.

Lifestyle may include views on politics, religion, health, intimacy, and more. All of these aspects play a role in shaping someone's lifestyle. In the magazine and television industries, "lifestyle" is used to describe a category of publications or programs.

== History of lifestyles studies ==
Three main phases can be identified in the history of lifestyles studies:

=== Lifestyles and social position ===
Earlier studies on lifestyles focus on the analysis of social structure and of the individuals' relative positions inside it. Thorstein Veblen, with his 'emulation' concept, opens this perspective by asserting that people adopt specific 'schemes of life', and in particular specific patterns of 'conspicuous consumption', depending on a desire for distinction from social strata they identify as inferior and a desire for emulation of the ones identified as superior. Max Weber intends lifestyles as distinctive elements of status groups strictly connected with a dialectic of recognition of prestige: the lifestyle is the most visible manifestation of social differentiation, even within the same social class, and in particular it shows the prestige which the individuals believe they enjoy or to which they aspire. Georg Simmel carries out formal analysis of lifestyles, at the heart of which can be found processes of individualisation, identification, differentiation, and recognition, understood both as generating processes of, and effects generated by, lifestyles, operating "vertically" as well as "horizontally". Finally, Pierre Bourdieu renews this approach within a more complex model in which lifestyles, made up mainly of social practices and closely tied to individual tastes, represent the basic point of intersection between the structure of the field and processes connected with the habitus.

=== Lifestyles as styles of thought ===
The approach interpreting lifestyles as principally styles of thought has its roots in the soil of psychological analysis. Initially, starting with Alfred Adler, a lifestyle was understood as a style of personality, in the sense that the framework of guiding values and principles which individuals develop in the first years of life end up defining a system of judgement which informs their actions throughout their lives. Later, particularly in Milton Rokeach's work, Arnold Mitchell's VALS research and Lynn R. Kahle's LOV research, lifestyles' analysis developed as profiles of values, reaching the hypothesis that it is possible to identify various models of scales of values organized hierarchically, to which different population sectors correspond. Then with Daniel Yankelovich and William Wells we move on to the so-called AIO approach in which attitudes, interests and opinions are considered as fundamental lifestyles' components, being analysed from both synchronic and diachronic points of view and interpreted on the basis of socio-cultural trends in a given social context (as, for instance, in Bernard Cathelat's work). Finally, a further development leads to the so-called profiles-and-trends approach, at the core of which is an analysis of the relations between mental and behavioural variables, bearing in mind that socio-cultural trends influence both the diffusion of various lifestyles within a population and the emerging of different modalities of interaction between thought and action.

=== Lifestyles as styles of action ===
Analysis of lifestyles as action profiles is characterized by the fact that it no longer considers the action level as a simple derivative of lifestyles, or at least as their collateral component, but rather as a constitutive element. In the beginning, this perspective focussed mainly on consumer behaviour, seeing products acquired as objects expressing on the material plane individuals' self-image and how they view their position in society. Subsequently, the perspective broadened to focus more generally on the level of daily life, concentrating – as in authors such as Joffre Dumazedier and Anthony Giddens – on the use of time, especially loisirs, and trying to study the interaction between the active dimension of choice and the dimension of routine and structuration which characterize that level of action. Finally, some authors, for instance Richard Jenkins and A. J. Veal, suggested an approach to lifestyles in which it is not everyday actions which make up the plane of analysis but those which the actors who adopt them consider particularly meaningful and distinctive.

== Health ==
A healthy or unhealthy lifestyle will most likely be transmitted across generations. According to the study done by Case et al. (2002), when a 0-3-year-old child has a mother who practices a healthy lifestyle, this child will be 27% more likely to become healthy and adopt the same lifestyle. For instance, high income parents are more likely to eat more fruit and vegetables, have time to exercise, and provide the best living condition to their children. On the other hand, low-income parents are more likely to participate in unhealthy activities such as smoking to help them release poverty-related stress and depression. Parents are the first teacher for every child. Everything that parents do will be very likely transferred to their children through the learning process.

Adults may be drawn together by mutual interest that results in a lifestyle. For example, William Dufty described how pursuing a sugar-free diet led to such associations:

I have come to know hundreds of young people who have found that illness or bingeing on drugs and sugar became the doorway to health. Once they reestablished their own health, we had in common our interest in food. If one can use that overworked word lifestyle, we shared a sugarfree lifestyle. I kept in touch with many of them in campuses and communes, through their travels here and abroad and everywhere. One day you meet them in Boston. The next week you run into them in Southern California.

== Class ==
Lifestyle research can contribute to the question of the relevance of the class concept.

== Media culture ==
The term lifestyle was introduced in the 1950s as a derivative of that of style in art:

"Life-styles", the culture industry's recycling of style in art, represent the transformation of an aesthetic category, which once possessed a moment of negativity [shocking, emancipatory], into a quality of commodity consumption.

Theodor W. Adorno noted that there is a "culture industry" in which the mass media is involved, but that the term "mass culture" is inappropriate:

In our drafts, we spoke of "mass culture." We replaced that expression with "culture industry" in order to exclude from the outset the interpretation agreeable to its advocates: that it is a matter of something like a culture that arises spontaneously from the masses themselves, the contemporary form of popular art.

The media culture of advanced capitalism typically creates new "life-styles" to drive the consumption of new commodities:

Diversity is more effectively present in mass media than previously, but this is not an obvious or unequivocal gain. By the late 1950s, the homogenization of consciousness had become counterproductive for the purposes of capital expansion; new needs for new commodities had to be created, and this required the reintroduction of the minimal negativity that had been previously eliminated. The cult of the new that had been the prerogative of art throughout the modernist epoch into the period of post-war unification and stabilization has returned to capital expansion from which it originally sprang. But this negativity is neither shocking nor emancipatory since it does not presage a transformation of the fundamental structures of everyday life. On the contrary, through the culture industry capital has co-opted the dynamics of negation both diachronically in its restless production of new and "different" commodities and synchronically in its promotion of alternative "life-styles."

== See also ==
- Aeromobility – Act of taking frequent trips
- Alternative lifestyle – Lifestyles perceived to be outside the cultural norm
- Anthropology – Scientific study of humans, human behavior, and societies
- Intentional living – Lifestyle
- Life stance – Person's relation with what they accept as being of ultimate importance
- Lifestyle brand – Identification for a good or service; marketing based on a common value of a subculture
- Lifestyle guru – Personal development advisor
- Lifestyle medicine – Aspects of medicine focused on food, exercise, and sleep
- Otium – Leisure time in ancient Roman culture
- Personal life – Course or state of an individual's life
- Sedentary lifestyle – Type of lifestyle involving little to no physical activity
- Simple living – Simplified, minimalistic lifestyle
- Style of life
- Sustainable living – Lifestyle
- Tao – Philosophical concept native to China
