= Style of life =

Term describing the dynamics of personality

The term style of life (German: Lebensstil) was used by psychiatrist Alfred Adler as one of several constructs describing the dynamics of the personality.

== Origins ==
Adler was influenced by the writings of Hans Vaihinger, and his concept of fictionalism, mental constructs, or working models of how to interpret the world. From them he evolved his notion of the teleological goal of an individual's personality, a fictive ideal, which he later elaborated with the means for attaining it into the whole style of life.

== The Life Style ==
The style of life reflects the individual's unique, unconscious, and repetitive way of responding to (or avoiding) the main tasks of living: friendship, love, and work. This style, rooted in a childhood prototype, remains consistent throughout life, unless it is changed through depth psychotherapy.

The style of life is reflected in the unity of an individual's way of thinking, feeling, and acting. The life style was increasingly seen by Adler as a product of the individual's own creative power, as well as being rooted in early childhood situations. Clues to the nature of the life style are provided by dreams, memories (real or constructed), and childhood/adolescent activities.

Often bending an individual away from the needs of others or of common sense, in favor of a private logic, movements are made to relieve inferiority feelings or to compensate for those feelings with an unconscious fictional final goal.

At its broadest, the life style includes self-concept, the self-ideal (or ego ideal), an ethical stance and a view of the wider world.

Classical Adlerian psychotherapy attempts to dissolve the archaic style of life and stimulate a more creative approach to living, using the standpoint of social usefulness as a benchmark for change.

== Types of style ==
Adler felt he could distinguish four primary types of style. Three of them he said to be "mistaken styles".

These include:

1. the ruling type: aggressive, dominating people who don't have much social interest or cultural perception.
2. the getting type: dependent people who take rather than give.
3. the avoiding type: people who try to escape life's problems and take little part in socially constructive activity.
4. the socially useful type: people with a great deal of social interest and activity.

Adler warns that the heuristic nature of types should not be taken seriously, for they should only be used "as a conceptual device to make more understandable the similarities of individuals". Furthermore, he claims that each individual cannot be typified or classified because each individual has a different, unique meaning and attitude toward what constitutes success.

To present the individual understandably, in words, requires an extensive reviewing of all his facets. Yet too often psychologists are tempted away from this recognition to take the easier but unfruitful roads of classification. That is a temptation to which, in practical work, we must never yield. It is for teaching purposes only, to illuminate the broad field, that we shell designate here four different types in order temporarily to classify the attitude and behavior of individuals toward outside problems.

— Alfred Adler, The Individual Psychology of Alfred Adler

== Religious interpretation ==
Adler used life style as a way of psychologising religion, seeing evil as a distortion in the style of life, driven by egocentrism, and grace as first the recognition of the faulty life style, and then its rectification by human help to rejoin the human community.

== Wider influence ==
- Wilhelm Stekel discussed the 'Life goals' (Lebensziele) set in childhood, and neurosis as their product, in what Henri Ellenberger described as "Adler's ideas expressed almost in his own words".
- Strongly influenced by Adler was the idea of a life script in Transactional analysis. Discussing the script as "an ongoing life plan formed in early childhood", Eric Berne wrote that "of all those who preceded transactional analysis, Alfred Adler comes the closest to talking as a script analyst". He quoted him as saying: "'If I know the goal of a person I know in a general way what will happen...a long-prepared and long-meditated plan for which he alone is responsible'".

== See also ==
- Classical Adlerian psychology
- Lifestyle (sociology)
- Neo-Adlerian
- Individual Psychology
