= Raissa Adler =

Austrian feminist (1872–1962)

Raissa Timofeyevna Adler, née Epstein (Russian Раи́са Тимофе́евна А́длер) (born November 9, 1872, in Moscow; died April 21, 1962, in New York City) was a Russian-born Austrian women's rights activist of Russian-Jewish origin.

== Life ==
Raissa Epstein was born in 1872. She was daughter of a wealthy close-knit Russian-Jewish family. She received school lessons from private teachers since it was not possible for women to study in Russia in the 19th century. She went to Zürich in 1895 where she studied biology for three semesters at the University.

At the end of 1896 she moved to Vienna and joined the women's movement there. She met Alfred Adler and married him in 1897 in Smolensk. She gave birth to four children: Valentina in 1898, Alexandra in 1901, Kurt in 1905 and Cornelia in 1909. The liberally educated, politically radical and free-spirited Raissa had contact with revolutionary Russian emigrants. She became friends with Leo Trotsky through the Russian-Jew émigré Aline Furtmüller and worked with him in 1929.

Adler was involved in the area of women's issues under the Vienna City Councilor for Health Julius Tandler. Together with Tandler and Margarete Hilferding, Adler was also a co-founder of the Workers International Relief in Austria, in the committee of the Red Aid and joined the Communist Party of Austria. In 1922, she was a member of the preparatory committee of a Viennese Clarté movement (Peace movement founded in 1919 by Henri Barbusse). At the beginning of the 1930s, she was on the board of the Association for Individual psychology. After the Austrian Civil War in February 1934, she was arrested for two days because of her political activism. This incident prompted Alfred Adler to personally bring them from Vienna to the USA, where the couple emigrated to in 1935. After World War II, Adler served for a time as chairwoman of the executive committee of the Individual Psychology Association in New York. In 1954 she was elected honorary president of the board of directors.
