= Ferenc Völgyesi =

Hungarian physician (1895–1967)

Ferenc András Völgyesi (11 February 1895, Budapest – 3 July 1967, Uccle) was a controversial Hungarian physician, psychiatrist and hypnotist who published dozens of articles and books, had a prosperous private practice, and gained fame in Hungary and abroad. Völgyesi, along with Ara Jeretzian, established a medical clinic during the latter days of World War II credited with saving the lives of approximately 400 Jews. Völgyesi also served as an agent of the Hungarian Secret Service, codenamed "Viktor", starting in 1962.

== Early life ==
Ferenc Völgyesi was born in 1895 to Ábrahám (Adolf) Völgyesi and Hermina (Mária) Klein. His father was the owner of the Zöldvadász restaurant and the Trieszti nők pub in Budapest. After his death, Völgyesi's mother ran the establishments, and invested in apartment houses. Völgyesi was Jewish but in 1938 Völgyesi and his family converted to Lutheranism.

Völgyesi claimed that at the age of 17 he first discovered his ability to hypnotize. He hypnotized an 18-year-old girl who remained catatonic for three days.

== Medical training and military service ==
Völgyesi started medical studies in 1912 at the University of Medicine in Budapest. He was deployed in 1916, before graduating from medical school, to the battle fought between Hungarian and Russian troops on the Dniester River, where he recounts, "I was doing my medical supervising circuit on horseback on a beautiful sunny morning in May, and listening with a smile to the trivial complaints of the healthy sunburnt young artillerymen from Budapest...suddenly the Russian artillery opened fire...That was the first time I heard the terrible, agonized death-cry of HELP -- break forth simultaneously from a whole crowd of men...I had to amputate limbs with a penknife, and without any local anesthetic." Völgyesi received his medical degree in 1917 and soon after established a successful private practice, which was initially shared with the celebrated lay hypnotist Alfréd Pethes.

In 1912–1914, Völgyesi was an intern, and later teaching assistant at the Anatomical Institute of the University of Budapest. After his graduation, he served as a surgeon, and was later certified as a neurologist. In 1917, he was one of the founders of the Trade Union of Physicians and of the Újpest and Rákospalota National Ambulance Association. He served at the Military Command, and was later transferred to the 72nd Artillery Battalion, the 1st Division, and in 1918-1919 was the Chief Paramedic of the Hungarian Red Army. He attained First Lieutenant and later Major rank (in 1945 he was commissioned Major in reserve). In a letter written in 1944 requesting exemption from anti-Jewish regulations, he asserted that he had incited the paramedic corps against the Communist regime, was sentenced to death, but managed to flee to Transdanubia, and volunteered to the Hungarian National Army, led by Miklós Horthy, becoming Chief Paramedic of the Szombathely and Budapest Artillery Corps. He received a number of decorations during his service, and after the Soviet occupation of Hungary in 1945 was also awarded the Commemorative Medal for the Hungarian Soviet Republic. In the interwar period, he served as an assistant physician at the Departments of Neurology and Orthopedy of the Szt. János Hospital. After obtaining a certificate in medical forensics in 1927, he also served as a forensic expert.

== Hypnosis Practice ==
Initially Völgyesi focused his practice on treating trauma from the recent war. But he discovered, to his surprise, that the "victims of so-called peace" were as numerous as the victims of war.

He often scheduled his patients so that they would spend lengthy amounts of time in the waiting room with other patients, who were instructed to "talk about anything except your illness." He saw this as a useful form of informal group therapy.

In 1920, Völgyesi published the book Hypnosis: the Place and Application of Hypnosis in Modern Medicine.

During 50 years of medical practice Völgyesi's writings were widely published and reprinted, with 250 articles and 25 books in Hungarian, English, French, German, Spanish and Russian. According to him, between 1917 and 1963 he treated more than 62,000 patients, using hypno-suggestive therapy more than 800,000 times. However, his broader fame came from his experiments in animal hypnosis rather than with human subjects, an important aspect of hypnosis research largely forgotten by historians.

In his works, Völgyesi described and gave photographic evidence for the hypnosis of lobsters, crocodiles, birds, bears, lions, monkeys, and other animals to become frozen in a state of hypnotic catalepsy. He aimed to prove the common biological origins of hypnotic states in both man and animals. He maintained in this written works that the ability to hypnotize animals suggested that verbal suggestion was not the only method of hypnosis, and that these nonverbal techniques were applicable to humans as well.

In 1939 the photographer Andor Fischer filed a lawsuit against Völgyesi, claiming that Völgyesi did not pay for the photos that Fischer was hired to take of hypnotized animals. Fischer further asserted that the photos were copies of drawings of hypnotized animals, or photos of animals that were not hypnotized. The photo of the bear, for example, that Völgyesi claimed had hypnotized, was, according to Fischer, actually taken in a Hungarian circus after the chained animal had been tortured, and the chains were subsequently erased from the photo. The court denied Fischer's claims.

In 1939 Völgyesi toured North America and Europe and gave a lecture at Yale University. He was also received by Clark Hull, William Brown, Julian Huxley, and Carl Jung, among others.

Völgyesi's writings also veered into discussions of the temperaments of women and men, mysticism, love, war, happiness, civilization, and personal anecdotes. For instance, a 1942 published review of one of Völgyesi's books describes that, "the opus as a whole is uninterpretable, moreover, it is even not clearcut because of its mosaic-like nature in which professional knowledge is merged with anecdotes, and mysticism is implanted into natural science."

== German Recruiting Attempts ==
German psychiatrist (and active National Socialist) Matthias Göring attempted to recruit Völgyesi in 1938 to form a "national group" of psychiatrists in Hungary to affiliate with the Nazi regime. Völgyesi responded to Göring with reasons that he could not support the establishment of such a group.

Hungarian newspapers during this period of time made reference to Völgyesi's academic relationship with Göring. An attempt was made to parlay Völgyesi's correspondence with Göring into a "protected Jew" status for Völgyesi during the Arrow Cross period in Hungary. Also referring to his relations with Göring, Völgyesi wrote a petition in June 1944, requesting exemption from anti-Jewish regulations on account of his "counterrevolutionary conduct" against the Hungarian Soviet Republic, and his military service and decorations.

In 1942, Völgyesi volunteered to the Hungarian Army as a regiment paramedic in reserve, but was only allowed to serve for a short period of time. Between April and November 1944, he did labor service at the Szt. János Hospital but soon established his own clinic at his apartment.

== Yellow Star House at 1 Zichy Jenő Street ==
In late 1944 the Nazi-allied Arrow Cross Party took control of Hungary and accelerated efforts to round up and deport Jews. Völgyesi co-led the conversion of an apartment building at 1 Zichy Jenő utca in Budapest, where Völgyesi and his family resided, into a medical clinic staffed by mostly Jewish doctors and nurses. The clinic took in all patients in need of care, including Jews, Arrow Cross soldiers, and (later) Russian soldiers. While the effort was mainly led by an Armenian-born Christian named Ara Jeretzian, who obtained false and real permits at great personal risk to operate the clinic in defiance of official orders to resettle all Jews in another part of town, Völgyesi also played a key role, and put himself and his family at great risk. Völgyesi's reputation as a world-famous psychiatrist helped to keep the clinic from being shut down by the authorities. A life-sized portrait of Völgyesi in a gold-plated frame was covered with a life-sized portrait of Ferenc Szálasi, leader of the Arrow Cross Party.The clinic managed to stay open up until the Russian occupation of Budapest, saving the lives of approximately 400 Jews who had been harbored there. According to Jeretzian's memoir, Jeretzian obtained papers in order for Völgyesi, a Jew, to avoid being detained during the Arrow Cross period, and he also harbored Völgyesi's wife in his apartment to avoid surprise raids and deportation. Later, Völgyesi turned angry toward Jeretzian for delaying the restoration Volgyesi's apartment to his personal use, as the space was still being used to treat patients. This caused Volgyesi to complain about Jeretzian to the Soviet occupying forces, who imprisoned and tortured Jeretzian for six months.

== Postwar life ==
In 1945, Völgyesi reportedly praised the Red Army in a newspaper article, and later claimed that he had been in contact with the Soviet military counterintelligence services. Between 1945 and 1948 he was a member of the Social Democratic Party, but was expelled before its merger with the Communist Party of Hungary in 1948. In 1950, Völgyesi began working at the Péterfy Hospital, while continuing to receive patients at his private practice. In 1949, Völgyesi was criticized in the newspaper of the Communist Party of Hungary for his allegedly unscientific methods, and was expelled from the Trade Union of Physicians. However, he was quickly readmitted.

In 1949, Cardinal József Mindszenty, the leader of the Catholic Church in Hungary, was convicted of treason against the Communist People's Republic of Hungary in a show trial widely condemned by the international community. Mindszenty was extensively tortured and was forced to sign a confession. Völgyesi was repeatedly accused of playing a role in "preparing" Cardinal József Mindszenty, Archbishop of Esztergom and leader of the Catholic Church in Hungary, for his 1949 show trial. Notably, however, there seems to be no evidence to his involvement in the trial in the Historical Archives of the Hungarian State Security, the memoirs of Mindszenty, or in the books in which the documents of the case were published. According to Margit Balogh's monumental biography of Mindszenty, the story of Mindszenty's hypnosis by Völgyesi was made up László Sulner, a handwriting expert involved in the trial. Sulner presented his claims of using hypnosis and drugs on Mindszenty to the US Consulate in Austria, who were suspicious of the allegations. Later, Sulner published the story in the Chicago Sun-Times. A document from the Radio Free Europe archives dated 1956 claims that Völgyesi "prepared" Mindszenty for the trial. Völgyesi's wife was reported to have complained that Völgyesi's colleagues cut off social contact with them as a result of his role in the Mindszenty trial. In the spring of 1963 the Voice of America relayed a similar report, claiming that Völgyesi hypnotized Mindszenty following orders from the leader of the State Protection Authority (ÁVH), Gábor Péter, and ÁVH Colonel István Bálint, a torture expert, and later Head of the Medical Division of the ÁVH. This report seems to have resulted in Völgyesi and his wife being denied entry visas to Canada, and a delay in being issued visas to the United States, making it impossible for them to visit their daughter and her newborn daughter there.

The Hungarian Secret Service began conducting surveillance on Völgyesi not later than 1957 (codename "Charlatan"), and continued to do so until at least May 1963. Starting in 1962, Völgyesi, codenamed "Viktor," agreed to participate as an informant to the Hungarian Secret Service. Völgyesi was asked or offered to spy on a variety of people with whom he had family, professional, and social ties, such as his sons-in-law (one of whom was a language interpreter for the Cabinet of the European Common Market in Brussels), his patients (including the First Secretary of the Austrian Embassy in Hungary), "American millionaire" Bruce Gelb, and economist and art historian John Michael Montias. Volgyesi's primary motivation for agreeing to spy for the regime was to obtain permission for him and his wife to travel abroad, as all three of their children had emigrated from Hungary. Völgyesi also co-led spiritualist circles aiming to convince patients to choose specific surgeons to perform operations in exchange for large payments, warning that the patients would otherwise die. He also, it was claimed, attempted to contact deceased Nazi leaders from the spirit world, to ask for regime change in Hungary.
