= Superiority complex =

Psychological defense mechanism articulated by Alfred Adler

A superiority complex is a defense mechanism that develops over time to help a person cope with feelings of inferiority. The term was coined by Alfred Adler (1870–1937) in the early 1900s, as part of his school of individual psychology.

Individuals with a superiority complex typically come across as arrogant, prideful, and disdainful toward others. They may treat others in an imperious, overbearing, and even aggressive manner.

== Alfred Adler ==
Alfred Adler was the first to use the term superiority complex. He claimed that a superiority complex essentially came from the need to overcome underlying feelings of inferiority: an inferiority complex. Throughout his works Adler intertwines the occurrence of an inferiority complex and a superiority complex as cause and effect. Among his writings touching on the topic were Understanding Human Nature (1927), and Superiority and Social Interest: A Collection of Later Writings, a collection of twenty-one papers written by Adler and published posthumously in 1964.

Adler distinguished a normal striving to achieve from superiority complexes, the latter being attempts in order to overcompensate a feeling of inferiority. He states that those with an inferiority complex develop a superiority complex to overcome the difficulties presented by the former, primarily by inflating their sense of self-importance in some way. Dreams of heroism, and a false assumption of success, revealed for Adler the reactive nature of such strivings.

While Adler considered what he refers to in his writing as striving for superiority was a universal of human nature, he thought sound-minded individuals do not strive for personal superiority over others, rather for personal ambition and success through work. By contrast, those with an actual superiority complex were riddled with conceited fantasies, and with dreams of immutable supremacy.

== Other interpretations ==
An edition of the Diagnostic and Statistical Manual of Mental Disorders that was published about twenty years after Alfred Adler's works said the superiority complex (under the formal name of grandiose delusion in the DSM IV) did not come solely from the effects of an inferiority complex, and that a second cause of the delusional disorder could stem from an exaggerated emotional state.

Ada Kahn said that the superiority and inferiority complexes cannot both be found in the same individual, since individuals with superiority complexes truly believe that they are superior to others.

Vera Hoorens said that those exhibiting the superiority complex have a self-image of supremacy. Whereas individuals with an inferiority complex tend to present themselves in the best light possible, those with a superiority complex may not even attempt to make themselves look good, or to express their superiority to others. They may speak as if they are all-knowing and better than others, but ultimately do not care if others think so or not, much like with the cognitive bias known as illusory superiority.

== Cultural examples ==
- Driven to achieve in order to overcompensate his humble origins, and small stature, Picasso was described by his former partner, Fernande Olivier, as possessing a superiority complex: "He said he could only be touched by things to which he felt superior".
- Beethoven's nobility pretence was the result of a superiority complex; and it was the same complex that fuelled his extraordinary musical achievements. Ernst Bloch said of the young musician's boastful claims "This piece of presumption was needed to enable him to become Beethoven".

== See also ==
- Complex
- Dunning–Kruger effect
- Egotism
