= Sexual orientation discrimination =

Discrimination of person because of sexual orientation

Sexual orientation discrimination (also known as sexualism) is discrimination based on a person's sex, sexual orientation, or pregnancy.

== Sexual bias ==
Sexual orientation discrimination often comes up in the context of employment actions. It refers to sexual prejudice, a negative attitude towards someone that is based on their sexual orientation. An example of this bias is homophobia, which refers to discrimination towards someone who is homosexual. Often in the work environment, this is seen with heterosexual individuals who are prejudiced against lesbian, gay, and bisexual people (among others). This is specifically referred to as heterosexism.

An earlier definition of this term is: Sexual orientation discrimination is a belief or argument that one sexual orientation or sexual behavior is inherently superior to some or all others. Usually, it comes in the form of heterosexuality being considered the only natural, normal, or moral mode of sexual behavior, and is also used to refer to the effects of that instinct. The word heterosexism has also been proposed to mean essentially the same thing as this form of sexual orientation discrimination. This word has been suggested as an alternative to homophobia, in part because it uses a parallel structure to sexism or racism. The intent of the concept of heterosexism is the examination of the cultural bias against non-heterosexuals rather than individual bias, which is the focus of homophobia, as well as the adverse effects of normative heterosexuality on heterosexual-identifying people.

== Forms of discrimination ==
=== Employment actions ===
Employment actions (or ultimate employment actions), refer to hiring, firing, demotions, promotions, and compensation. Adverse employment actions, however, include termination, demotions, suspension, and changes to conditions, responsibilities and pay. Title VII of the Civil Rights Act of 1964 prohibits employment discrimination on the basis of sex. In Bostock v. Clayton County, the Supreme Court found that adverse employment actions made due to an employee's sexual orientation or gender identity violate Title VII.

=== Service provision ===
Sexual orientation discrimination also occurs at the time of service provision from a business or government agency to an individual or group. Such services may include dining at a restaurant, visiting a partner at the hospital, receiving healthcare, or acquiring a marriage license.

== Sexuality or sexual nature ==
The term pansexualism, seen especially in the field of early-20th-century psychoanalysis, was based on the usage of the term "sexualism" to refer to humanity's sexual nature. The terms "homosexualism" and "bisexuals" were also based on this usage, and were commonly used before the general adoption of the terms homosexuality and bisexuality.

== Key court decisions ==
=== Latta v. Otter ===
Latta v. Otter is a court case that resulted from a federal lawsuit filed by four couples from Boise, Idaho, where same-sex marriage remained illegal until the couples' victory in 2014. Before Latta v. Otter, only 16 U.S. states had legalized same-sex marriage, and Idaho refused to recognize same-sex marriages performed in such states. On September 8, 2014, the Ninth Circuit ruled that Idaho's ban on same-sex marriage was a violation of the U.S. Constitution's guarantee of equal protection.

=== Obergefell v. Hodges ===
Obergefell v. Hodges is the landmark civil rights case that resulted in federal legalization of same-sex marriage in the United States. In July 2013, James Obergefell and John Arthur James filed a lawsuit in the state of Ohio because it refused to recognize same-sex marriages on death certificates. In September 2013, the lawsuit was amended to include a second gay couple and a funeral director who feared prosecution for falsifying death certificates if he were to note same-sex spouses on gay clients' documents.

=== Hively v. Ivy Tech Community, College of Indiana ===
Hively v. Ivy Tech Community College restuled in an 8-3 decision by the Seventh Circuit Court of Appeals that sex discrimination includes homophobia, and therefore violates federal civil rights law. Part-time professor and open lesbian Kimberley Hively applied multiple times for full-time employment. Still, she was not approved, and her contract was not renewed. She claimed that this was due to her sexuality, and filed with the Equal Employment Opportunity Commission. The Seventh Circuit Court ruled in her favor.

=== Bostock v. Clayton County ===
Before the Bostock v. Clayton County case, the language of Title VII in the Civil Rights Act of 1964 left the phrase 'based on sex' up for interpretation. The U.S. Equal Employment Opportunity Commission has recognized members of the LGBTQ community as a protected class under Title VII since 2013, but even in 2020, only 21 states had extended employment discrimination protections to members the LGBTQ community. The Bostock ruling found that discrimination based on sexual orientation or gender identity would be considered discrimination based on sex.

== See also ==
- Antisexualism – Hostility towards sexuality
- Biphobia – Aversion to bisexual people
- Discrimination against asexual people
- Discrimination against LGBTQ people
- Heteronormativity – Concept asserting heterosexuality as the only social norm
- Homophobia – Negative attitudes towards homosexual people
- Sexualization – To make something sexual in character
- Transphobia – Anti-transgender prejudice
