= Matthias Göring =

20th-century German psychiatrist

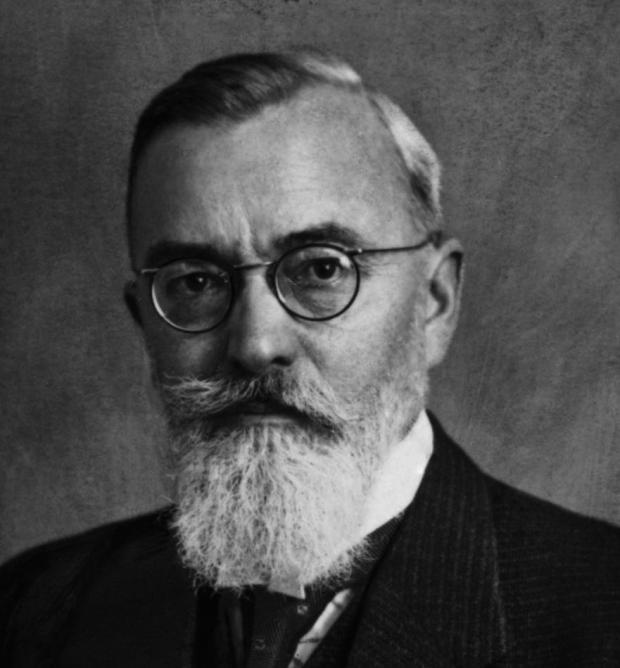
Portrait of Matthias Heinrich Göring

Matthias Heinrich Göring (5 April 1879, Düsseldorf – 24/25 July 1945, Posen) was a German psychiatrist, born in Düsseldorf. He died in prison in Poznań. He was an active Nazi.

Göring started his studies with a doctorate in law, and a doctorate in medicine at Bonn in 1907. Specializing in psychiatry and neurology he did a training analysis with Adlerian Leonhard Seif in Munich.

Like his fellow Adlerians Seif and Fritz Künkel, Göring placed an emphasis upon "community feeling," to which he added German patriotism and Christian pietism. He was therefore critical of the contemporary Freudian psychoanalysis for its alleged materialism and pansexualism.

Göring's significance in the history of psychoanalysis stems from his career after 1933. His position as leader of organized psychotherapy in Nazi Germany stemmed from the fact that he was an elder cousin of the Nazi Hermann Göring. In part to protect the fledgling institution of psychotherapy against Nazi medical activists and university psychiatrists, Göring (who joined the Nazi party in 1933) preached against "Jewish" psychoanalysis and supervised the exclusion of Jewish psychoanalysts, particularly those from the Freudian school of thought, from his society and institute.

In 1934 Göring assumed leadership of the German General Medical Society for Psychotherapy and from 1936 to 1945 both annexed and then became director of the Berlin Psychoanalytic Institute/German Institute for Psychological Research and Psychotherapy in Berlin. In 1938 he presided over the dissolution of the German Psychoanalytic Society and the Vienna Psychoanalytic Society/Vienna Psychoanalytic Institute, although made official on 25 August, Göring left behind a small "study group" in Vienna connected to the Göring Institute. and appointed psychiatrist/neurologist Heinrich Von Kogerer as its figurehead. Matthias also employed the psychotherapists Felix Boehm, Carl Müller-Braunschweig, Harald Schultz-Hencke, and Werner Kemper and a friend to Karen Horney, all of them members of the anti- or Neo-Freudianism movement. In 1933, Harald Schultz-Hencke like several non-Jewish psychotherapists helped set up the "Goering Institute" which was closely linked to the Nazi regime and promoted a "New German soul medicine," a psychotherapy for Germans.
