= Xiaomingxiong =

Hong Kong activist

Xiaomingxiong (traditional Chinese: 小明雄; 1954–?) is the pen name of Wu XiaoMing (Ng Siuming, 吳小明), also known as Samshasha, is a veteran Hong Kong gay right activist and one of the first authors to study the history of homosexuality in China.

== Biography ==
Xiaomingxiong was born in 1954 in Hong Kong to Chinese parents emigrated from the mainland. His father owned a wood cutting factory but went bankrupt during the second world war when the Japanese occupied Hong Kong. At a young age, Xiaomingxiong was exposed to a variety of political, cultural, and religious identities, being interested in Christianity and colonial Britain while also reading books on communism and socialism that were banned in Hong Kong at the time. Xiaomingxiong finished high school at the age of sixteen and went to the United States for university education in 1971. His arrival at Louisiana and later Austin, Texas, at the University of Texas at Austin coincided with the advance of the sexual revolution throughout the Western world. It was there that he met fellow students who self-labeled themselves as gay and came across the first wave of gay liberation writings. Though Xiaomingxiong read about gay life through books, it would not be until after graduation in 1975 during a brief stay in Hong Kong that he began exploring his sexuality. In 1976, Xiaomingxiong went to New York to pursue a graduate study in geology, in hopes of returning to China and finding oil. His attention was, however, quickly diverted to the vibrant post-Stonewall New York City. In the years that followed, he explored firsthand various aspects of the new urban gay lifestyle, interviewing first generations of gay bookshop owners, gay parents, and homosexuals from different races, among others. In 1978, Xiaomingxiong met with Daniel Tsang in Philadelphia, Pennsylvania. They later recorded the first interview in Cantonese on gay liberation in 1979. In June 1979, Xiaomingxiong travelled to the White House along with Third World gay and lesbian delegates, representing Asian Americans. There, he met with Midge Costanza, Assistant to the President for Public Liaison of President Jimmy Carter, pushing for anti-discrimination legislation and raising concerns regarding the United States immigration procedures.

Front cover of issue 2 of Samshasha's Pink Triangle Newsletter published in 1980

At the end of 1979, Xiaomingxiong returned to British colonial Hong Kong, where homosexual acts were still illegal and punishable by life imprisonment. He was quick to discover the one and only local underground gay bar at the time, the Dateline, through the then editor of the City Magazine. There, he met a wealthy Chinese merchant, who agreed to finance Xiaomingxiong for his first gay liberation Chinese publication, A Chinese Gay's Manifesto (1980). This was followed by the underground newsletter "Pink Triangle" (1981) and the book Twenty-five Questions about Homosexuality (1981). The public's reactions also earned Xiaomingxiong a column space in the City Magazine, allowing him to openly disseminate information and advice on homosexuality. After more than five years of preparations, the comprehensive The History of Homosexuality in China was published in 1984 just before the announcement and agreement of the Sino-British Joint Declaration. A later revision of The History of Homosexuality in China was published in 1997, just before the transferral of ownership of Hong Kong from Britain to China.

== Selected works ==
=== The History of Homosexuality in China (Chinese, 1984, revised 1997) ===
==== Context ====
Xiaomingxiong first started working on his 1984 book The History of Homosexuality when he was still in New York. After meeting at the White House, Xiaomingxiong went to the Library of Congress where he found and read a book called The Secret History of Homosexuality (Chinese, 1964). While there was a great amount of historical information, Xiaomingxiong felt that the analysis of male homosexuality was inaccurate, saying "the comments the author made on why people become homosexual were just ridiculous." During this time, homosexual acts between men was still illegal in Hong Kong because many Chinese's beliefs were that homosexuality was a "foreign vice" imported from the West. Xiaomingxiong began to write his own book in response to these beliefs. With the Sino-British Joint Declaration looming overhead, Xiaomingxiong rushed to publish his book in fear of suppressions towards freedoms of speech. Though published through the Pink Triangle Press, Xiaomingxiong received little support in publishing, and he financed and distributed The History of Homosexuality (1984) personally.

In 1991, consensual homosexual acts in the private sphere was legalized in Hong Kong. Six years later, the revised version of The History of Homosexuality was published on the eve of July 1, 1997, right before the Hong Kong handover.

==== Content ====
The History of Homosexuality (1984) documents a history of "same-sex" love within China from the Zhou dynasty to the 1980s. The book itself touches upon homosexual activities amongst various social groups and settings, specifically in "divided families on the mainland seaboard, the royal court, the nobility, scholars, and sexually segregated groups such as prisoners." With references to history, fiction, folktales, official court records, legal codes, religious documents, literature and arts, accounts by foreign missionaries, and even common slang and jokes, this book aimed to comprehensively record mentions of same-sex love in China. In writing The History of Homosexuality (1984), Xiaomingxiong's main argument was to counter the belief that homosexuality was a "disease/sin brought from the West," claiming that same-sex love actually flourished in Chinese history and tradition and that it was actually homophobia that was inherited from British rule.

In the 1997 edition of The History of Homosexuality, Xiaomingxiong made several revisions. Alongside more historical documentation, Xiaomingxiong added a preface providing contextual information regarding shifts in the social and political climate of Hong Kong in the 1980-90s. He amended his original claims; instead of arguing for "homophobia is a Western import," Xiaomingxiong argued that "existing homophobia in China was being Westernized." Scholar Helen Hok-Sze Leung states that the reason for this change was:

[B]y the time the revised edition came…in 1997, the discursive relationship between homophobia, coloniality and nationalism had shifted considerably…[These] discursive shifts in Hong Kong society and the potential for nativist tendencies in tongzhi discourse to be appropriated into a newly hegemonic Chinese nationalism prompts him [Xiaomingxiong] to reframe his understanding of homophobia in Hong Kong as a Westernized rather than Western phenomenon.

Xiaomingxiong goes on to claim that Chinese homophobia, before Westernization, functioned through an implicit "fuzzy-transgender-transsexual pansexualism," in which same-sex love was accepted as long as there was a "transgender feminization" of a male partner and the "coexistance of hetereosexual familial relationships." Leung further critiques this analysis, highlighting the reduction of transgender and bisexual identities into homophobic "regulatory mechanisms" of homosexuality.

==== Controversy ====
After the initial publication of The History of Homosexuality (1984), Xiaomingxiong came across Bret Hinsch's book Passions of the Cut Sleeve: The Male Homosexual Tradition in China (1992). After reading through the publication, Xiaomingxiong believed that some of the content and organization of Hinsch's book was similar to his. Though Xiaomingxiong reached out to Hinsch's publisher, no legal action was pursued due to his limited financial resources.

== Bibliography ==
=== Non-Fiction ===
- The History of Homosexuality in China (Chinese, 1984, revised 1997)

=== Booklets ===
- A Chinese Gay's Manifesto (Chinese, 1980)
- Twenty-five Questions About Homosexuality (Chinese, 1981)
- Thirty Questions About Homosexuality (Chinese, 1989)

=== Newsletter ===
- "Pink Triangle"" (Chinese, 1980-1)

== See also ==
- Homosexuality in China
- Transgender in China
