= Neo-Freudianism =

Psychoanalytic approach

Neo-Freudianism is a psychoanalytic approach derived from the influence of Sigmund Freud but extending his theories towards typically social or cultural aspects of psychoanalysis over the biological.

The neo-Freudian school of psychiatrists and psychologists were a group of loosely linked American theorists/writers of the mid-20th century "who attempted to restate Freudian theory in sociological terms and to eliminate its connections with biology."

== Dissidents and post-Freudians ==
=== Dissidents ===
The term neo-Freudian is sometimes loosely (but inaccurately) used to refer to those early followers of Freud who at some point accepted the basic tenets of Freud's theory of psychoanalysis but later dissented from it. "The best-known of these dissenters are Alfred Adler and Carl Jung.… The Dissidents."

An interest in the social approach to psychodynamics was the major theme linking the so-called neo-Freudians: Alfred Adler had perhaps been "the first to explore and develop a comprehensive social theory of the psychodynamic self." Following "Adler's death, some of his views…came to exert considerable influence on the neo-Freudian theory." Indeed, it has been suggested of "Horney and Sullivan ... that these theorists could be more accurately described as 'neo-Adlerians' than 'neo-Freudians'."

=== Post-Freudians ===
The Independent Analysts Group of the British Psycho-Analytical Society ("Contemporary Freudians") are—like the ego-psychologists (e.g. Heinz Hartmann) or the intersubjective analysts in the States—perhaps best thought of as "different schools of psychoanalytic thought," or as "Post-Freudians…post-Freudian developments." They are distinct from the Kleinian schools of thought and include figures such as Christopher Bollas, D. W. Winnicott, and Adam Phillips.

== Neo-Freudian ideas ==
=== History ===
As early as 1936, Erich Fromm had been independently regretting that psychoanalysts "did not concern themselves with the variety of life experience…and therefore did not try to explain psychic structure as determined by social structure." Karen Horney, too, "emphasised the role culture exerts in the development of personality and downplayed the classical driven features outlined by Freud."

Erik H. Erikson, for his part, stressed that "psychoanalysis today is…shifting its emphasis…to the study of the ego's roots in the social organisation," and that its method should be "what H. S. Sullivan called 'participant', and systematically so."

Doctor and psychotherapist Harald Schultz-Hencke (1892–1953) was thoroughly busy with questions like impulse and inhibition and with the therapy of psychoses as well as the interpretation of dreams. He worked with Matthias Göring in his institute (Deutsches Institut für psychologische Forschung und Psychotherapie), and created the name Neopsychoanalyse in 1945. The "Neo-Freudian revolt against the orthodox theory of instincts" was thus anchored in a sense of what Harry Stack Sullivan termed "our incredibly culture-ridden life." By their writings, and "in accessible prose, Fromm, Horney, and others mounted a cultural and social critique which became almost conventional wisdom."

Through informal and more formal institutional links, such as the William Alanson White Institute, as well as through likeness of ideas, the neo-Freudians made up a cohesively distinctive and influential psychodynamic movement.

=== Basic anxiety ===
Karen Horney theorized that to deal with basic anxiety, the individual has three options:

1. Moving toward others: Accept the situation and become dependent on others. This strategy may entail an exaggerated desire for approval or affection.
2. Moving against others: Resist the situation and become aggressive. This strategy may involve an exaggerated need for power, exploitation of others, recognition, or achievement.
3. Moving away from others: Withdraw from others and become isolated. This strategy may involve an exaggerated need for self-sufficiency, privacy, or independence.

=== Basic personality ===
The neo-Freudian Abram Kardiner was primarily interested in learning how a specific society acquires adaptation concerning its environment. He does this by forming within its members what he names a "basic personality." The "basic personality" can initially be traced to the operation of primary institutions. It ultimately creates clusters of unconscious motivations in the specific individual "which in turn are projected in the form of secondary institutions," such as reality systems. The basic personality finds expression in the secondary institutions.

== Criticism ==
"Fenichel developed a stringent theoretical critique of the neo-Freudians", which informed and fed into the way "Herbert Marcuse, in his 'Critique of Neo-Freudian Revisionism'...icily examines the tone of uplift and the Power of Positive Thinking that pervades the revisionists' writings, and mocks their claims to scientific seriousness."

In comparable fashion, "an article…by Mr Edward Glover, entitled Freudian or Neo-Freudian, directed entirely against the constructions of Mr Alexander" equally used the term as a form of orthodox reproach.

In the wake of such contemporary criticism, a "consistent critique levelled at most theorists cited above is that they compromise the intrapersonal interiority of the psyche;" but one may accept nonetheless that "they have contributed an enduring and vital collection of standpoints relating to the human subject."

== Influence, successors, and offshoots ==
In 1940, Carl Rogers had launched what would become person-centred psychotherapy, "crediting its roots in the therapy of Rank...& in the neo-Freudian analysts—especially Karen Horney." A decade later, he would report that it had "developed along somewhat different paths than the psychotherapeutic views of Horney or Sullivan, or Alexander and French, yet there are many threads of interconnection with these modern formulations of psychoanalytic thinking."

A half-century further on, whether by direct or by indirect influence, "consistent with the traditions of these schools, current theorists of the social and psychodynamic self are working in the spaces between social and political theory and psychoanalysis" once again.

=== Cultural offshoots ===
In his skit on Freud's remark that "if my name were Oberhuber, my innovations would have found far less resistance," Peter Gay, considering the notional eclipse of "Oberhuber" by his replacement Freud, adjudged that "the prospect that deviants would have to be called neo-Oberhuberians, or Oberhuberian revisionists, contributed to the master's decline."

== Neo-Freudians ==
- Alfred Adler
- Erik Erikson
- Erich Fromm
- Frieda Fromm-Reichmann
- Karen Horney
- Carl Jung
- Abram Kardiner
- Harald Schultz-Hencke
- Harry Stack Sullivan
- Clara Thompson

=== Others with possible neo-Freudian links ===
- Franz Alexander
- Jessica Benjamin
- Nancy Chodorow
- Richard Hakim
- Thomas Ogden
- David Rapaport
- Alex Unger
