= The Practice and Theory of Individual Psychology =

1924 book by Alfred Adler

- Title page for The Practice and Theory of Individual Psychology (1946 edition)
- Author: Alfred Adler
- Translator: P. Radin
- Language: English
- Subject: Psychology
- Publication date: 1924
- ISBN: 9781136330094

The Practice and Theory of Individual Psychology is a work on psychology by Alfred Adler, first published in 1924. In his work, Adler develops his personality theory, suggesting that the situation into which a person is born, such as family size, sex of siblings, and birth order, plays an important part in personality development. Adler is among the many therapists who have noted the significance and impact of the relationship between attitudes towards oneself and others, and highlighting the relationship between regard for self and love of another. Adler claimed that the tendency to disparage others arises out of feelings of inferiority. Adler also describes the self as part of a reflection of the thoughts of others, seeing self-esteem as determined, in part, by feelings toward significant others. According to Adler, people are inherently motivated to engage in social activities, relate to other people, and acquire a style of life that is fundamentally social in nature.
