= Harald Schultz-Hencke =

German psychiatrist and psychotherapist

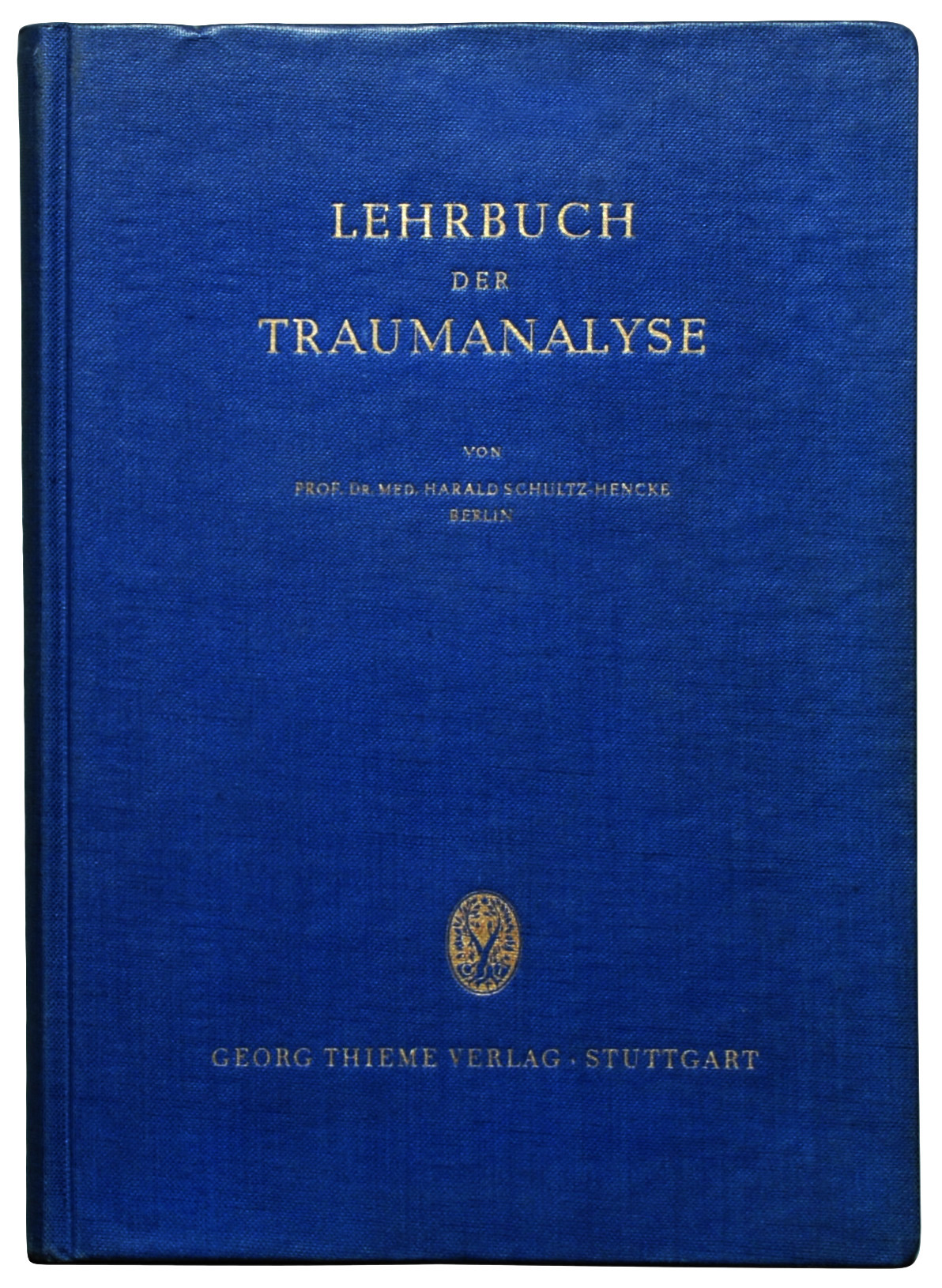
Lehrbuch der Traumanalyse, 1949

Harald Julius Alfred Carl-Ludwig Schultz-Hencke (18 August 1892, Berlin – 23 May 1953, Berlin) was a German psychiatrist and psychotherapist. After an initial introduction to psychoanalysis, with Sandor Rado as psychoanalyst, he was excluded from the German Society of Psychoanalysis because of, among other things, his divergent views on sexuality.

Schultze-Hencke was the son of Dankmar Schultz-Henke, a chemist who was the founder of the photographic institute at the Lette-Verein, and Rosa Zingler, a graphologist who had written the libretto to the opera Die Sibylle von Tivoli by Alfred Sormann and who was rumoured to be an illegitimate daughter of King Edward VII.

== Career in psychotherapy ==
In 1933, like several non-Jewish psychotherapists (Felix Julius Boehm, Carl Müller-Braunschweig and Werner Kemper) he helped set up the "Göring Institute" (named after Matthias Göring), which was closely linked to the Nazi regime and promoted a “New German soul medicine," a psychotherapy for Germans. After the war, his participation in this institute created controversy in professional circles such as the International Psychoanalytical Association.

With other psychotherapists and analysts who had left or had been excluded from other psychoanalytic organizations, he started the DPV (Deutsche Psychoanalytische Vereinigung). After numerous debates regarding whether or not these analysts should join the International Psychoanalytical Association, Schultz-Hencke, who had long been in disagreement with the basic tenets of Freudian theory, created "Neopsychanalyse." "Neopsychanalyse" or neopsychoanalysis is a psychotherapeutic technique thus named by Schultz-Hencke.

== Influence of Leibnizian symbolic thought ==
In one of his books, Schultz-Hencke had asserted that all psychotherapy should be submitted to the Leibnizian principle that "all science must be expressed in mathematical terms." This implies that even a young science must strive towards this goal. In this perspective, Schultz-Hencke analyzed all Freudian concepts and eliminated all those that do not respond to this precept, or that, according to him, could never respond to it, such as infantile sexuality, etc. So, in a way, the dualistic view of Freudian psychoanalysis is challenged in favor of a monistic view (and thus does not include notions of conflict between psychic entities, etc.).

Schultz-Hencke also wanted to subject the Oedipus complex to statistical studies. To some extent, this criticism joined that of Karl Popper and other more modern scientists who, before anything else, advocated quantitative analysis and, thus, statistics. The treatment technique advocated by Schultz-Hencke was subsequently developed by Helmut Bach, among others, who progressively demarcated the ideas of its founder to create a "psychoanalysis" within the limits of practices imposed by the IPA; psychotherapists such as Franz Alexander, Karen Horney, René Laforgue, and Erich Fromm have contributed significantly to this endeavor.

== Publications (selected) ==
- 1917: Der Einfluß des militärischen Kriegsdienstes auf die progressive Paralyse. - Freiburg i. B. : Speyer & Kaerner
- 1920: Der Sinn unserer Zeit und die freien Volkshochschulen als Vorkämpfer neuen Bildungswesens : Grundsätzliches z. Revolutionierung von Schule u. Unterricht, Berlin-Wilmersdorf: Volkshaus-Verlag
- 1927: Einführung in die Psychoanalyse; Jena: G. Fischer
- 1931: Schicksal und Neurose : Versuch e. Neurosenlehre vom Bewusstsein her, Jena: Fischer
- 1940: Der gehemmte Mensch : Entwurf eines Lehrbuches der Neo-Psychoanalyse, Stuttgart: Thieme, 6. unveränd. Auflage, Stuttgart 1989, ISBN 3-13-401806-3
- 1949: Lehrbuch der Traumanalyse. Stuttgart: G. Thieme

== Sources ==
- Alain de Mijolla (ed.). International Dictionary of Psychoanalysis, 3rd vol.: "Schultz-Hencke, Harald Julius Alfred Carl-Ludwig (1892–1953)", Macmillan Reference Books, ISBN 0-02-865924-4
- Cocks, Geoffrey. (1985). Psychotherapy in the Third Reich: The Göring Institute (2nd ed). New York: Oxford University Press
- Theilemann, Steffen, Harald Schultz-Hencke und die Freideutsche Jugend: biografie bis 1921 und die Geschichte einer Bewegung (Giessen: Psychosozial-Verlag, 2018) ISBN 978-3-8379-2802-0.
