= Ernst Rudorff =

German composer and music teacher (1840–1916)

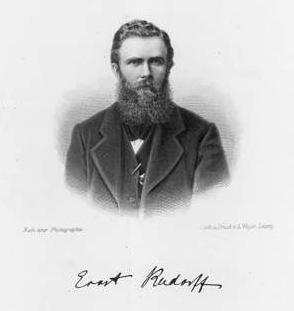

Ernst Friedrich Karl Rudorff (January 18, 1840 – December 31, 1916) was a German composer and music teacher, also a founder of the nature protection movement "Heimatschutz".

== Biography ==
Born in Berlin, Rudorff studied piano under Woldemar Bargiel from 1852 to 1857 before enrolling at the Leipzig Conservatory in 1859, where he studied under Ignaz Moscheles, Louis Plaidy, and Julius Rietz. He was also a private pupil of Moritz Hauptmann and Carl Reinecke.

In 1865 he became a piano teacher at the Cologne Conservatory, and he founded the Bach-Verein Köln in 1867. He moved to Berlin in 1869, and for four decades, to his retirement in 1910, was the head piano teacher at the Berlin Hochschule. He also conducted the Stern Gesangverein from 1880 to 1890, succeeding Max Bruch.

His collection of music manuscripts, scores, and correspondence is one of the largest and most important such collections still held in private hands. It includes autographs by Bach, Beethoven, Bruch, Clementi, Dussek, Gluck, Handel, Mendelssohn, Mozart, and Salieri. The collection materials date not just from his lifetime but from those of his father and grandfather. The collection started when his grandfather Carl Pistor outbid Carl Zelter for a group of Johann Sebastian Bach manuscripts that had been owned by Wilhelm Friedemann Bach. Mendelssohn learned of Pistor's acquisition and catalogued the manuscripts which included 13 complete cantata manuscripts; in return Pistor gifted him the autograph of newly acquired Bach's cantata Ich freue mich in Dir.

As early as 1878, Rudorff wrote on the negative effects that mass tourism and rapid industrialization has on the environment. He advocated for the creation of an organization that protected the environment while opposing the creation of railways, especially those solely for tourists. He would coin the term "Heimatschutz", starting a movement following these principles.

His students included Fridtjof Backer-Grøndahl, Wilhelm Berger, Leo Blech, Gerard von Brucken Fock, Leopold Godowsky, Elsie Hall, Siegfried Ochs, Alexandre Rey Colaço, Clemens Schmalstich, Carl Schuricht and Alfred Sormann. See: List of music students by teacher: R to S#Ernst Rudorff.

== Musical works ==
Among his works are: Symphony No. 1 in B flat, Op. 31; No. 2 in G minor, Op. 40; No. 3 in B minor, Op. 50; serenades for orchestra (Op. 20 in A; Op. 21 in G); three overtures, to Ludwig Tieck's Märchen vom blonden Ekbert (Op. 8); to Otto der Schütz (Op. 12); Romantische Ouverture (Op. 45); Ballade in 3 movements for orchestra (Op. 15); Variationen for orchestra (Op. 24); Romanze for violin and orchestra (Op. 41); Der Aufzug der Romanze (libretto by Ludwig Tieck) for solo, choir, and orchestra (Op. 18); Gesang an die Sterne (libretto by Friedrich Rückert) for six voices with orchestra; Herbstlied (Op. 43); String sextet in A (Op. 5); and many songs.

Rudorff also orchestrated Schubert's Fantasia in F minor; edited the full score of Weber's Euryanthe and the piano concertos and piano sonatas of Mozart; and published Weber's letters to Heinrich Lichtenstein (1900). His correspondence with Brahms and Joachim has also been published in collections of the latter two's letters.
