= Valentine Adler =

Austrian writer and activist (1898–1942)

- Born: 5 May 1898; Vienna, Austria
- Died: 6 July 1942 (aged 44); Unknown location in Russia
- Citizenship: Austria
- Occupation: Writer
- Spouse: Gyula Sas
- Parents: Alfred Adler; Raissa Timofeyevna Epstein
- Family: Alexandra Adler (sister)

Valentine Adler (also known as Vali Adler) (5 May 1898 – 6 July 1942) was an Austrian writer and activist sister of Alexandra Adler.

== Personal life ==
Valentine Adler was born in 1898 in Vienna, Austria. Her father was Alfred Adler (of Hungarian-Jewish and Austrian-Jewish origins) whilst her mother was Raissa Timofeyevna Epstein, daughter of a Russian-Jewish merchant family who lived in Moscow. She was the sister of Alexandra Adler. She married Hungarian journalist Gyula Sas.

== Political involvement ==
Adler joined the Communist Party of Austria in 1919. She left the party in 1921. That year, she joined the German Communist Party. She had interest in moving to the Soviet Union because of the political state of the country. As Nazism gained influence in Germany, her husband moved to Moscow. Adler moved there in 1933. Adler started to work as an editor at a publishing house focused around Soviet emigrants. She became disenchanted by the Soviet Union as the political and social climate changed and voiced her concerns through her writing.

== Arrest, sentencing and death ==
On 22 January 1937 Adler and Sas were arrested and imprisoned at the Lubyanka Building. She was interrogated there. She was then transferred to the Butyrki prison. On 19 September 1937 she was sentenced to ten years imprisonment for being "guilty of illegal Trotskyite activities and having established contacts with foreign Trotskyite groups." Her parents had met Leon Trotsky before, which the military tribunal claimed was the cause for Adler's interests and involvement in anti-Soviet activism. She died in a Gulag camp on 6 July 1942.

== Legacy ==
In 1952 Albert Einstein petitioned the Soviet Union to release details about Adler's trial. Until this petitioning, her death date was unknown. She was declared rehabilitated on 11 August 1956 by the Supreme Court of the USSR.
