= Rudolf Reitler =

Austrian physician and psychoanalyst

Rudolf Reitler (3 January 1865 – 26 March 1917) was an Austrian physician and psychoanalyst, noted as an early follower of Sigmund Freud.

== Biography ==
Born into a bourgeois Catholic family in Vienna, Reitler attended the Akademisches Gymnasium there. He passed his Matura examination in 1883, followed by medical studies at the University of Vienna until 1889. After practicing as a physician in Baden bei Wien, he headed a sanatorium in Vienna's first district from 1900.

Reitler appears to have been a childhood friend of Freud; as early as 1874, Freud mentioned him in a letter to his friend Eduard Silberstein. Together with Freud, Alfred Adler, Max Kahane, and Wilhelm Stekel, Reitler took part in the foundation of the so-called Wednesday Psychological Society, forming the nucleus of what was to become the Vienna Psychoanalytic Society in 1908. He is mentioned as having become the world's second analyst, after Freud himself. Between 1910 and 1914, Reitler wrote several shorter articles and reviews that appeared in the Zentralblatt für Psychoanalyse and the Internationale Zeitschrift für ärztliche Psychoanalyse.

Reitler's medical and scientific career was interrupted by a serious illness in 1914, forcing him to retire. He died at a sanatorium in Vienna in 1917.

== Selected bibliography ==
- Reitler, Rudolf (1911). "Kritische Bemerkungen zu Dr. Adler's Lehre vom 'männlichen Protest'". Zentralblatt für Psychoanalyse. I: 580–586.
- Reitler, Rudolf (1912). "Eine infantile Sexualtheorie und ihre Beziehung zur Selbstmordsymbolik". Zentralblatt für Psychoanalyse. II: 114–121.
- Reitler, Rudolf (1913). "Zur Augensymbolik". Internationale Zeitschrift für ärztliche Psychoanalyse. I: 158–161.
- Reitler, Rudolf (1913). "Zur Genital- und Sekret-Symbolik". Internationale Zeitschrift für ärztliche Psychoanalyse. I: 492–494.
- Reitler, Rudolf (1917). "Eine anatomisch-künstlerische Fehlleistung Leonardos da Vinci". Internationale Zeitschrift für ärztliche Psychoanalyse. IV: 205–207.
