= Alfred Sormann =

German pianist and composer

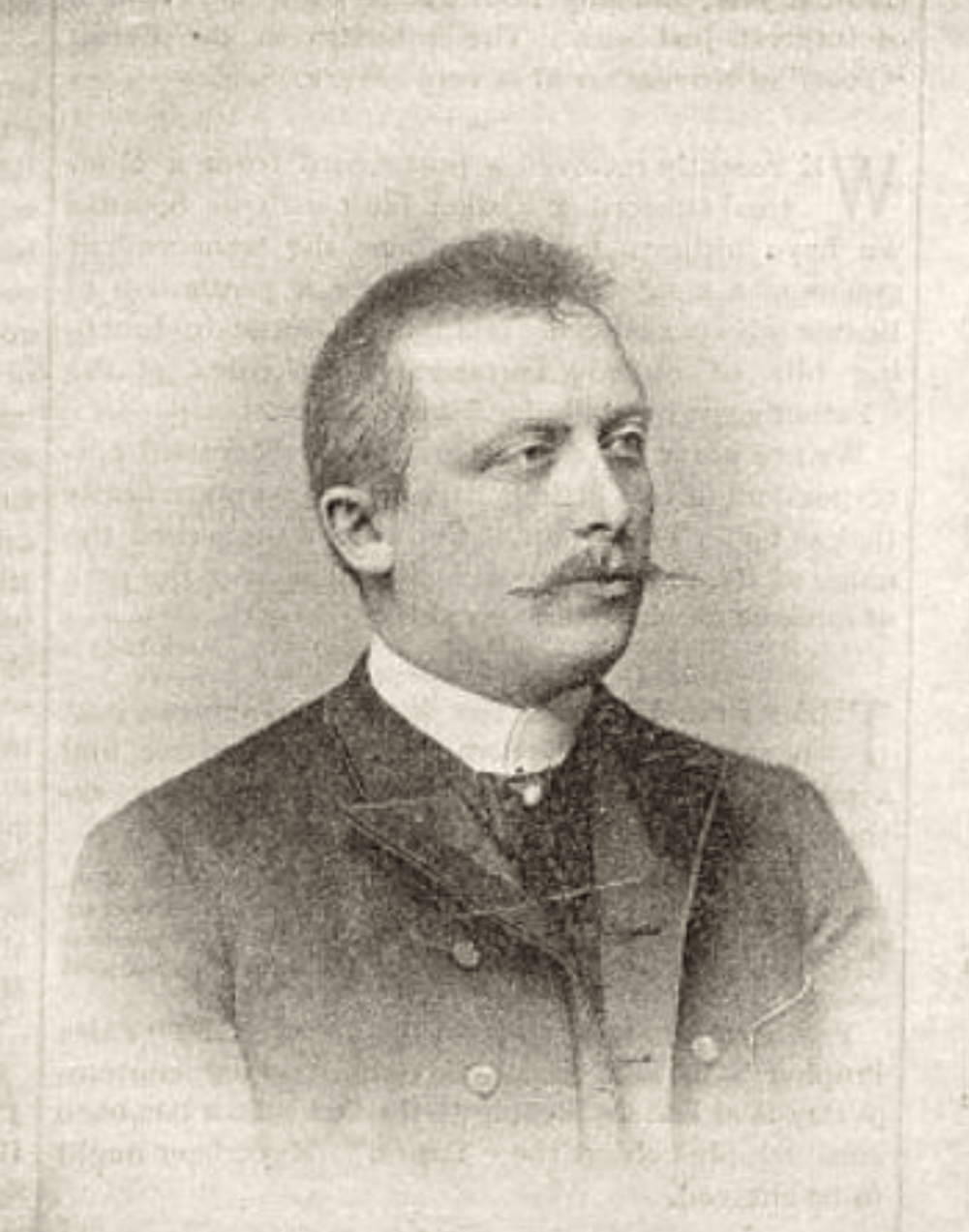
Alfred Sormann in 1890.

Alfred Richard Gotthilf Sormann (May 16, 1861 – September 17, 1913) was a German pianist and composer.

Sorman was born on May 16, 1861 in Danzig, Kingdom of Prussia. He studied at the Hochschule in Berlin under Ernst Rudorff, Karl Heinrich Barth, Philipp Spitta, and Woldemar Bargiel; in 1885 he was a pupil of Franz Liszt. His debut performance was in 1886, and he gave successful concerts in chief German towns. In 1889 he became court pianist to Friedrich Wilhelm, Grand Duke of Mecklenburg-Strelitz. He died in Berlin.

Among his works are the operas Die Sibylle von Tivoli (Berlin, 1902) with the libretto by Adelaide Rosa Schultze Henke (née Zingler, the mother of Harald Schultz-Hencke) and König Harald (Stettin, 1909); a piano concerto in E minor (opus 7); two string quartets; a piano trio; concert études; and other piano pieces.
