= Lynn R. Kahle =

American consumer psychologist

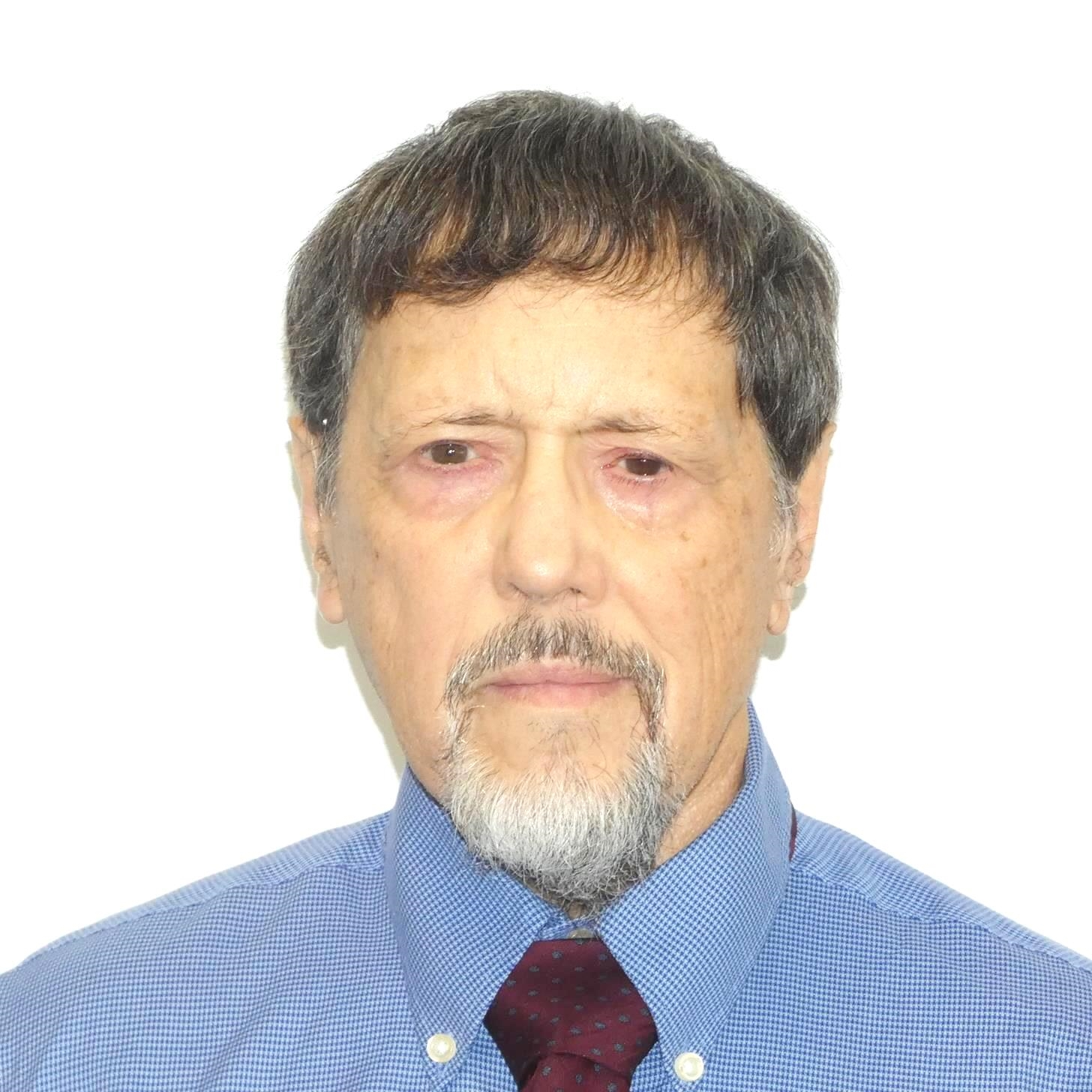
- Born: 1950 (age 75–76); Hillsboro, Oregon, U.S.
- Citizenship: U.S.A
- Known for: The Match-up Hypothesis, List of Values, Sports Marketing
- Spouse: Debra Eisert (deceased)
- Awards: Stotlar Award, Consumer Behavior Lifetime Achievement
- Scientific career
- Fields: Marketing, Psychology, Consumer Behavior
- Institutions: University of Oregon
- Doctoral advisor: Monte Page, John Berman
- Website: https://www.researchgate.net/profile/Lynn_Kahle

Lynn R. Kahle (born 1950) is an American consumer psychologist and Professor Emeritus at the University of Oregon's Lundquist College of Business. From 2018 to 2020 he taught at the Lubin School of Business, Pace University in New York as a visiting scholar and professor.

== Life ==
Kahle grew up in Hillsboro, Oregon, in the Portland metro area and graduated from Concordia College (later Concordia University) in Portland. He then graduated from Pacific Lutheran University in Tacoma, Washington, with a master's degree. He received his Ph.D. from the University of Nebraska–Lincoln and subsequently worked as a post-doctoral fellow at the University of Michigan Institute for Social Research. Kahle joined the University of Oregon in 1983 as a professor teaching in the College of Business. In 1990, he made an unsuccessful run to serve in the Oregon House of Representatives to represent District 43 as a Democrat.

He was the Academic Director of the Applied Information Management (AIM) program at the University of Oregon. He previously served as President of the Society for Consumer Psychology, which he represented on the American Psychological Association (APA) Council of Representatives from 2014 to 2019. He chaired the APA Membership Board in 2019.

Kahle developed the List of Values and has subsequently conducted research on values and lifestyles. He performed as founding academic director of the Warsaw Sports Marketing Center and has done extensive research in sports marketing. He has also studied consumption and sustainability, as well as consumption and religion. He served as Editor in Chief for the APA Handbook of Consumer Psychology.

== Work ==
Kahle has contributed to many concepts in consumer psychology, including: the match-up hypothesis, the role-relaxed consumer, the role of social values in consumption, attitude-behavior consistency, consumer thought processes, lifestyle marketing, stimulus condition self-selection, social media and sports fandom.

Kahle developed Social Adaptation theory, which maintains that people's cognitive life facilitates their functioning in their social environments. Communications is most effective when it emphasizes connections to a person's values, attitudes, and lifestyles. Sports marketing, for example, most deeply influences people whose lifestyle emphasizes sports. In social adaptation theory people actively attend to messages that inform their values. Values shape attitudes, which in turn guide behaviors. Social media have encouraged clustering of and interactions among people who share lifestyles and values. This theory has influenced work in marketing communication, global marketing, sports marketing, retailing, and consumer behaviour.

== List of values ==
Kahle's most widely adopted contribution to the field is the List of Values (LOV), a measurement instrument he introduced in 1983 as a parsimonious alternative to existing value scales for use in consumer research. The LOV comprises nine terminal social values self-respect, excitement, warm relationships with others, self-fulfillment, being well-respected, fun and enjoyment of life, security, sense of belonging, and sense of accomplishment drawn from earlier work by Milton Rokeach and Abraham Maslow but streamlined specifically for marketing and consumer psychology applications. A comparative study published in the Journal of Consumer Research in 1986 found that the LOV was in the public domain and related more closely to consumer behavior than the competing Values and Lifestyles|Values and Life Style (VALS) typology.

Subsequent research applied the LOV across multiple national contexts, including longitudinal tracking of social values in the United States from 1976 to 2017, and cross-cultural studies in Norway, Asia, and elsewhere. The instrument has been applied in research on sports fandom, sustainability, retail, gift-giving behavior, and religious values, and has been described by scholars as a widely used scale for the measurement of values in consumer behavior contexts.

== APA handbook ==
In 2022, Kahle served as Editor-in-Chief of the APA Handbook of Consumer Psychology, published by the American Psychological Association, with Tina M. Lowrey of HEC Paris and Joel Huber of Duke University serving as Associate Editors. The 33-chapter reference volume provides a comprehensive survey of the field, including historical background and coverage of core and emerging literature across areas such as consumer cognition, affect, communication, demographic and psychographic characteristics, and post-purchase behavior. The handbook draws on contributions from a wide range of scholars in consumer psychology and is designed as a library reference work aimed at researchers, practitioners, and graduate students.

== Personal life ==
Kahle was married to pediatric psychologist Dr. Debra Eisert, a clinical professor at Oregon Health & Science University who specialised in the developmental assessment of children, for approximately four decades. The two occasionally collaborated on research, including work on social attribution and child development published in the journal Human Development. Eisert died of multiple myeloma in June 2017. They had two sons, Kevin and Kurtus.

== Awards and honors ==
Kahle has won numerous awards. This include:

- The American Marketing Association Lifetime Achievement Award for the Consumer Behavior Special Interest Group.
- The Stotlar Award from the Sport Marketing Association, for lifetime contributions to education in sports business.
- The Distinguished Career Contributions to the Scientific Understanding of Sports Business from the American Marketing Association Sports Special Interest Group.
- The Thomas C. Stewart Distinguished Professor Award from the University of Oregon, awarded in 2014.
- The Albert Nelson Marquis Lifetime Achievement Award, received in 2018.

== Bibliography ==
Selected Publications

- Kahle, Lynn R., Lowrey, Tina, and Huber, Joel (Eds.). (2022). APA Handbook of Consumer Psychology. Washington, DC: American Psychological Association. ISBN 978-1-4338-3642-8
- Kahle, Lynn R., and Eda Gurel-Atay, Eds. (2014). Communicating Sustainability for the Green Economy. Armonk, NY: M.E. Sharpe. ISBN 978-0-7656-3680-5
- Minton, Elizabeth, and Lynn R. Kahle (2014). Belief Systems, Religion, and Behavioral Economics: Marketing in Multicultural Environments. New York, NY: Business Expert Press. 160 pages. ISBN 978-1-60649-704-3.
- Stockard, Jean, Gaylene Carpenter, and Lynn R. Kahle (2014). "Continuity and Change in Values in Midlife: Testing the Age Stability Hypothesis," Experimental Aging Research, 40, 1-21.
- Gurel-Atay, Eda, Guang-Xin Xie, Johnny Chen, and Lynn R. Kahle (2010). "Changes in Social Values in the United States, 1976-2007." Journal of Advertising Research, 50(1), 57–67.
- Kahle, Lynn R., Raymond Liu, Gregory M. Rose, and Woo-Sung Kim (2000). "Dialectical Thinking in Consumer Decision Making." Journal of Consumer Psychology, 9(1), 53-58
- Homer, Pamela M. and Lynn R. Kahle (1988). "A Structural Equation Test of the Value-Attitude-Behavior Hierarchy," Journal of Personality and Social Psychology, 54(April), 638–646.
- Kahle, Lynn R., Ed. (1983). Social Values and Social Change: Adaptation to Life in America. New York: Praeger. ISBN 0-03-063909-3
- Gurel-Atay & Kahle (2019), "Consumer Social Values" Routledge.ISBN 9781138240438
