= Heinz Ansbacher =

German-American psychologist

Heinz Ludwig Ansbacher (October 21, 1904 – June 22, 2006) was a German-American psychologist specializing in the theories of Alfred Adler.

== Biography ==
Ansbacher was born in Frankfurt am Main, German Empire. After completing high school he worked in a brokerage firm. He immigrated to the U.S. via steamer, working as a dishwasher. Upon arrival in New York City he resumed his career in the financial business and attended evening lectures by Alfred Adler. At one point he went to see Adler for a personal consultation concerning his unhappiness over his work and over the termination of a recent relationship. Adler encouraged him to enroll in graduate school.

He attended seminars in Adler's home, sparking his interest in psychology. Through Adler, he met Rowena Ripin, who had her doctoral degree from the University of Vienna. They were married a year later. Although he had no bachelor's degree, Ansbacher was admitted to the doctoral program at Columbia University. He wrote his doctoral dissertation on the perception of number as affected by the monetary value of objects, under R.S. Woodward, graduating in 1937. This work concerning the importance of context was cited in the 1939 American Psychological Association Presidential Address.

Ansbacher served on the faculty of Brown University from 1940 through 1943, and worked for Walter S. Hunter as an editor for Psychological Abstracts. Following this, he worked for the Office of War Information writing air-drop leaflets to convince German soldiers to give up the war effort. In addition, he wrote some papers on German military psychology. He came to the University of Vermont at Burlington (UVM) in 1947.

In 1958, Heinz Ansbacher took over the editorship of The Individual Psychology News and renamed the periodical the Journal of Individual Psychology - much to the satisfaction of Adlerians outside the USA. Under his editorship, which continued until 1974, the journal maintained high academic standards and was devoted to "a holistic, phenomenological, teleological, field theoretical, and socially oriented approach to psychology and related fields" endeavoring to "continue the tradition of Alfred Adler's Individual Psychology".

== Works and honors ==
Heinz and Rowena Ansbacher both worked directly with Alfred Adler as scholars and editors and are considered among the leading early followers of Classical Adlerian psychology. Their major contribution, The Individual Psychology of Alfred Adler (1956), is still the definitive text on individual psychology and is still in print. They also authored Superiority and Social Interest (1964) and Cooperation Between the Sexes (1978). Ansbacher said his collaboration with his wife Rowena was what really made the work so successful.

They were jointly awarded the degree of Doctor of Letters, Honoris Causa by UVM in 1980.

== Family ==
Heinz and Rowena Ansbacher were the parents of Charles Ansbacher (1942–2010), founder and conductor of the Boston Landmarks Orchestra, which gives free classical music concerts at various locations in the Boston area.
