= Inferiority complex =

Intense feeling of inadequacy and inferioriority

In psychology, an inferiority complex is a consistent feeling of inadequacy, often resulting in the belief that one is in some way deficient, or inferior, to others.

According to Alfred Adler, a feeling of inferiority may be brought about by upbringing as a child (for example, being consistently compared unfavorably to a sibling), physical and mental limitations, or experiences of lower social status (for example, being treated unfavorably by one's peers).

An inferiority complex may cause an individual to overcompensate in a number of ways. For example, a person who feels inferior because they are shorter than average (also known as a Napoleon complex) due to common modern day height prejudices may become overly concerned with how they appear to others. They may wear special shoes to make themself appear taller or deliberately surround themselves with individuals who are shorter than they are. If this is taken to the extreme, it becomes a neurosis.

It may also cause an individual to be prone to flashy outward displays, with behavior ranging from attention-seeking to excessive competitiveness and aggression, in an attempt to compensate for their either real or imagined deficiencies.

== Definition ==
According to the Cambridge Dictionary of Psychology, "[i]n Adlerian psychology, a combination of an erroneous belief of an individual that they are unable to cope with some aspect of life because of a real or imagined physical or psychological deficiency, feelings of depression, and a cessation of coping efforts in that area". In another sense "A general term for a personal sense of inferiority".

== History ==
The notion of an inferiority complex was introduced into the psychoanalytic branch of psychology by Alfred Adler, founder of classical Adlerian psychology, paralleling what Pierre Janet had called a feeling of incompleteness (sentiment d’incomplétude). The idea appears in many of Sigmund Freud's works, but has fallen out of favor due to later advances in theory. It was also used on occasion by Freud's sometime colleague Carl Jung, (who first employed the term complex in general as the denotation for a group of related ideas that conform to a certain pattern).

Adler considered that many neurotic symptoms could be traced to overcompensation for this feeling of inferiority, as well as such compensatory over-achievements as the oratory of the stammering Demosthenes.

== Causes ==
An inferiority complex occurs when the feelings of inferiority are intensified in the individual through discouragement or failure. Those who are at risk for developing a complex include people who show signs of low self-esteem or self-worth or have low status in their peer group. They may also display symptoms similar to depression. Children reared in households where the parents are perceived as having overbearing expectations may also develop an inferiority complex.

According to Adler, "Everyone (...) has a feeling of inferiority. But the feeling of inferiority is not a disease; it is rather a stimulant to healthy, normal striving and development. It becomes a pathological condition only when the sense of inadequacy overwhelms the individual and, far from stimulating them to useful activity, makes them depressed and incapable of development."

== Classifications ==
Classical Adlerian psychology makes a distinction between primary and secondary inferiority feelings.

- A primary inferiority feeling is said to be rooted in the young child's original experience of weakness, helplessness and dependency, where there is also a lack of parental acceptance and affection, or an actual constitutional weakness. It can then be intensified by comparisons to siblings, romantic partners, and adults.
- A secondary inferiority feeling relates to an adult's experience of being unable to reach a subconscious, reassuring fictional final goal of subjective security and success to compensate for the inferiority feelings. The perceived distance from that reassuring goal would lead to a negative/depressed feeling that could then prompt the recall of the original inferiority feeling; this composite of inferiority feelings, i.e. the original feeling recalled due to the secondary feeling, could be experienced as overwhelming. The reassuring goal invented to relieve the original, primary feeling of inferiority (which actually causes the secondary feeling of inferiority) is the "catch-22" of this dilemma.

== Effects ==
When an inferiority complex is in full effect, it may impact the performance of an individual as well as impact an individual's self-esteem. Unconscious psychological and emotional processes can inhibit a student's ability to receive and understand new information in addition to an excessive guardedness that results from an inability to accept or understand one's own subconscious feelings of inferiority.

In his PhD dissertation, Guy Hutt found that in students who display difficulty with math classes, the subject can become associated with a psychological inferiority complex, low motivation and self-efficacy, poor self-directed learning strategies, and feelings of being unsafe or anxious.

In the mental health treatment population, this complex sometimes overlaps in patients with other disorders such as certain types of schizophrenia, mood disorders, and personality disorders. Alfred Adler identified an inferiority complex as one of the contributing factors to some unhealthy childhood behaviors.

Individuals with increased feelings of inferiority have a higher tendency toward self-concealment, which in turn results in an increase in loneliness and a decrease in happiness.

== Superiority complex ==
Related to the inferiority complex is a "superiority complex", a psychological defense mechanism in which a person's outward display of superiority displaces or conceals their feelings of inferiority. Differentiated by Adler from a normal desire for social recognition, the superiority complex results in vulgar displays of self-worth or status, stemming from underlying feelings of inferiority – sometimes judged by observers to appear as a form of imposture.

== See also ==
- Contempt
- Respect
- Self-image
- Toxic positivity
- Self-deprecation
