= North American Society of Adlerian Psychology =

- Formation: 1952

The North American Society of Adlerian Psychology (NASAP) was created in 1952 and is the primary organization in the United States for the promotion of the psychological and philosophical theories of Alfred Adler, known as Adlerian Psychology or Individual psychology. Adler was a one-time collaborator with Sigmund Freud in the early days of the psychoanalytic movement who split with Freud to develop his own theories of psychology and human functioning.

In the late 1940s a group of psychiatrists and psychologists in Chicago, under the leadership of Rudolf Dreikurs, among others, founded an informal group to carry on discussion and teaching of theories and techniques of Adler. This early Adlerian organization became the Individual Psychology Association of Chicago, which quickly grew until it became the North American Society of Adlerian Psychology.

The current headquarters of the organization is in Canton, GA. Members are students and practitioners of Adlerian psychology (or individual psychology), coaches, parents, educators, and family members. Members are primarily concentrated in the United States and Canada, but there are also members from Uruguay, Brazil, Mexico, countries in Europe, Israel, Iran, China, Taiwan, Romania, and Japan. NASAP holds annual conferences in North American cities where practitioners share Adlerian counseling, education, and parenting techniques and theory.

== Organization ==
NASAP consists of the Council of Representatives (COR). The Council of Representatives is composed of Section Representatives and Affiliate Representatives, as well as the Board of Directors (BOD), and Committee and Task Force chairs and co-chairs.

The Board of Directors (BOD) includes the current President, vice-president, Past President, President-Elect, and the Treasurer, Secretary, Affiliate Liaison, and Section Liaison.

General Members of NASAP include Individual, Professional, Family, Associate, Retired, Lifetime, and Student Members.

NASAP's staff includes executive director, Susan Belangee, PhD, and one office administrative staff member.

=== NASAP Sections ===
Section Representatives are elected by their sections. Currently NASAP has six sections: Adlerian Counseling & Therapy (ACT), Education, Family Education, Professional Clinicians, Transformative Leadership & Coaching (TLC), and Theory, Research, & Teaching (TRT).

NASAP Affiliates

Affiliate Groups exist in North American and internationally. Affiliate groups have representatives, who are sent to the COR by their local Affiliate Organization. In order for Affiliates to send Representatives to the COR, they must have at least 5 general members of NASAP as active members of their Affiliate. Affiliate Organization membership has annual dues. To form an Affiliate Organization one needs to have an organization charter or constitution, by-laws, statement of purpose, a list of members, and approval by the board of directors.

=== NASAP Committees ===
There are committees include the Conference committee, Constitution & Bylaws, Finances & Grant Administration, Education & Professional Development, Ethics, Long Range Planning Committee (LRPC), Membership, Nominating committee, Publications & Theory Development and its subcommittee the Newsletter committee, and the Public Relations committee.

The Social Justice Task Force (SJTF) was established in 2020 and has two co-chairs.

== Publications ==
The principal publication of the Society is the Journal of Individual Psychology. This publication traces its root back to Zeitschrift für Individualpsychologie, a journal founded by Alfred Adler in 1914. Jon Sperry and Len Sperry are the current co-editors of the journal and the editorial team is located at Lynn University. It was known under several different titles, and incorporated the Individual Psychologist journal, also published by the Society.

NASAP also has an online newsletter called The Connection.
