= Alexandra Adler =

Austrian neurologist (1901–2001)

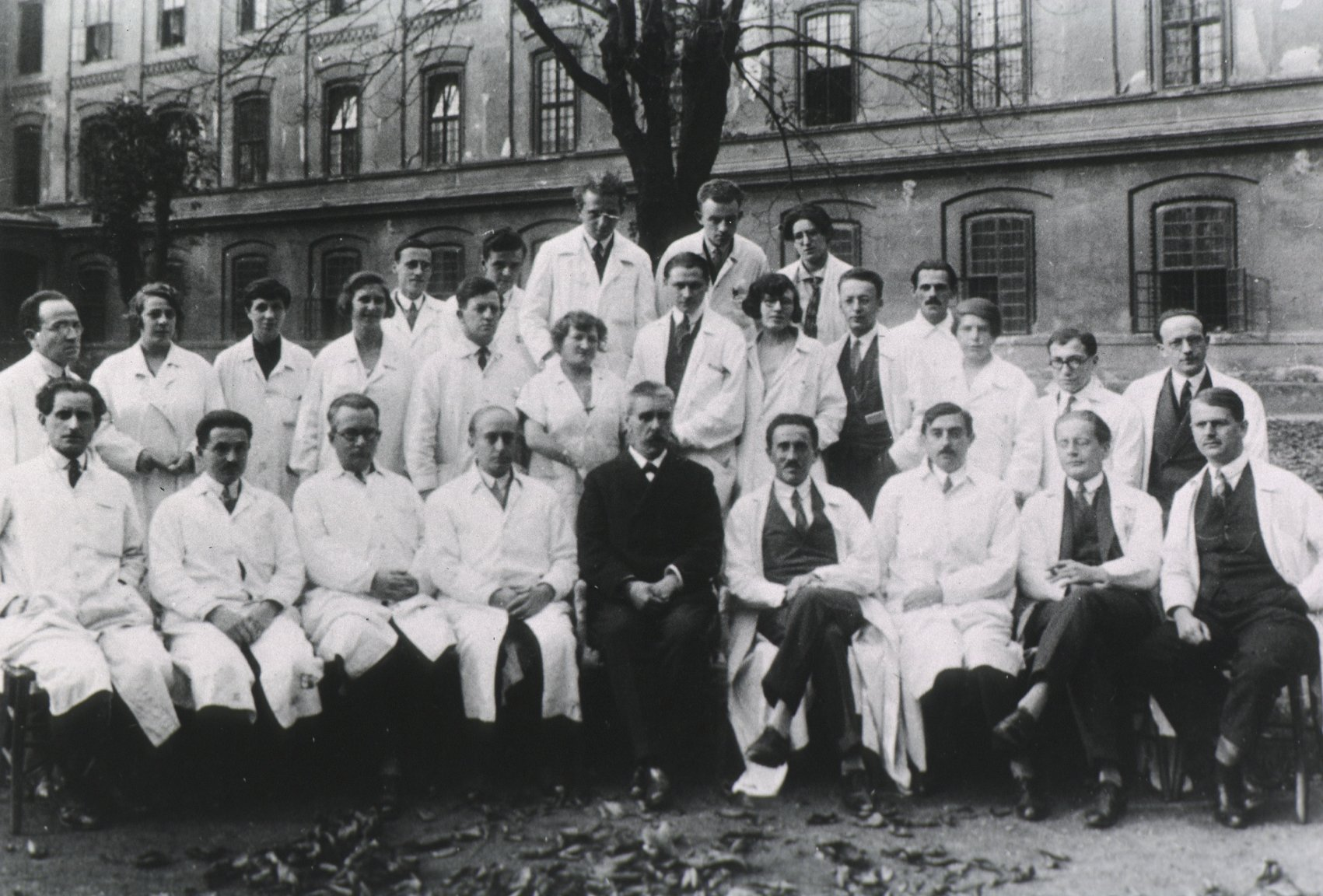
- Julius Wagner-Jauregg's staff in 1927
- Born: 24 September 1901; Vienna
- Died: 4 January 2001
- Occupations: Psychiatrist, neurologist
- Father: Alfred Adler

Alexandra Adler (24 September 1901 – 4 January 2001) was an Austrian-born neurologist and the daughter of psychoanalyst Alfred Adler and Raissa Adler. She has been described as one of the "leading systematizers and interpreters" of Adlerian psychology. Her sister was socialist activist Valentine Adler. Alexandra Adler's husband was Halfdan Gregersen.

== Career ==
Adler was born in September 24th 1901 in Vienna, Austria to a well-to-do Jewish family. Adler's father and grandfather were Austrian-Jews whilst her paternal grandmother was of Hungarian Jewish origin-. Adler's mother was born in Russia to a Russian-Jewish merchant family. Adler completed her medical studies at the University of Vienna in 1926, and then specialized in psychiatry at the University of Vienna Neuropsychiatric Hospital. She subsequently went on to assume a leadership position at the university's neurological department for women. In 1934, Adler ran a child guidance center, where she remained in charge until Nazis shut the center down. She emigrated to the United States in 1935, where she worked as a neurology instructor at the Harvard Medical School. She worked at as an instructor at Harvard for nine years. She was noted as one of Harvard's first women neurologists. Also in 1935, she established the Journal of Psychology. In 1938, Adler became the medical director of the Alfred Adler Clinic, named after her father. Adler was one of the leading interpreters of her father's theory, where she published many theories discussing individual psychology. In 1946 she joined New York University College of Medicine's psychiatry department, and became a professor there in 1969. During her time there, she had the opportunity to participate in many prestigious events, such as being one of the first women invited by the American Academy of Neurology (AAN) to speak at their 1949 First Annual Meeting. She spoke on the effects of visual agnosia. She also served as the president for the American Society of Adlerian Psychology.

== Medical studies ==
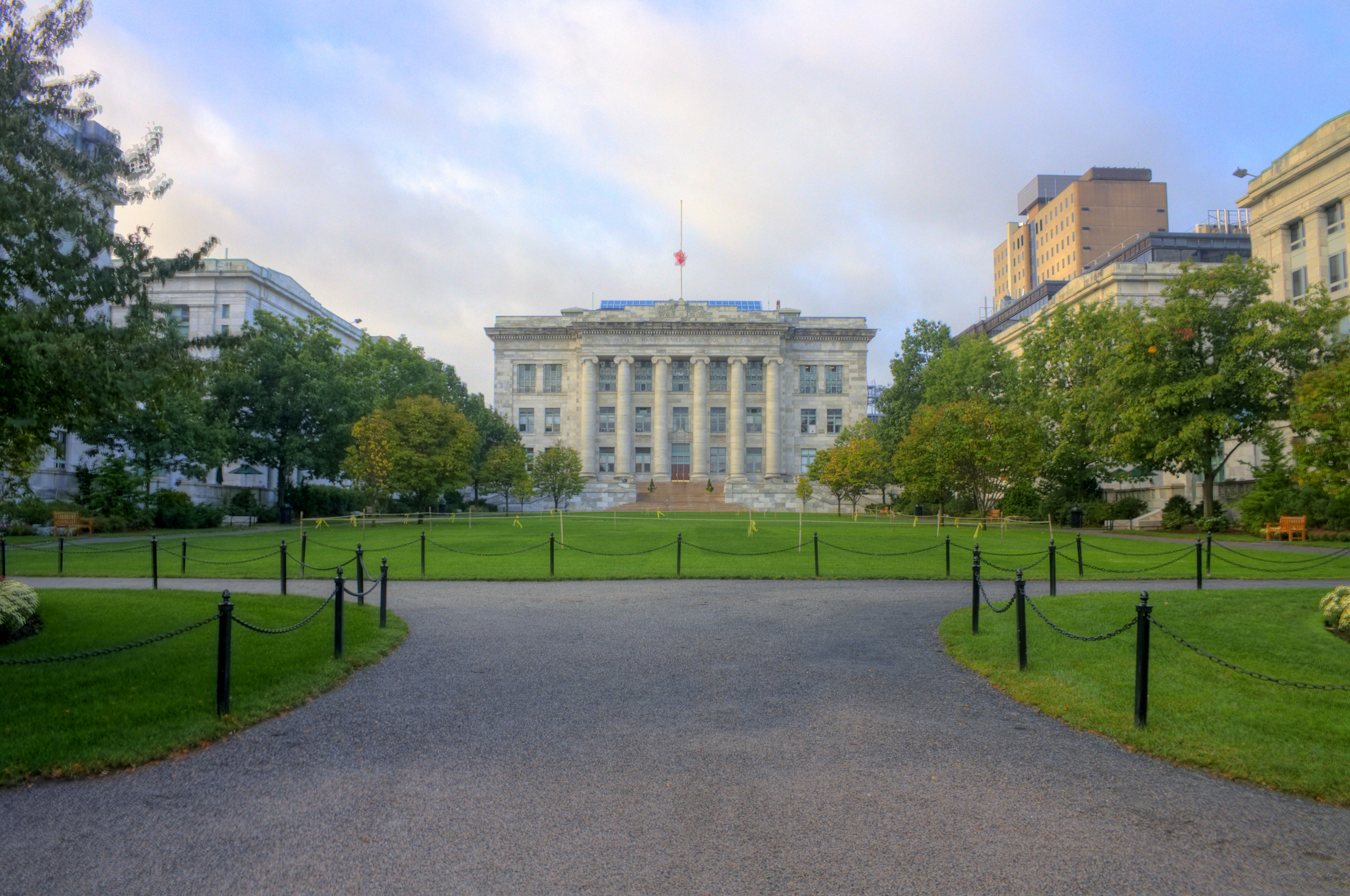
Harvard Medical School quadrangle in Longwood Medical Area

From 1928 to 1938, Alexandra Adler conducted an investigation at the Boston City Hospital examining known cases of encephalitis or encephalomyelitis, a disease that causes inflammation of the brain. The study included over 100 patients. Patients were only admitted if encephalitis was the sole illness of the individual. The aim of the study was to contribute knowledge for these diseases.

In 1937, Adler conducted a study along with the Harvard neurosurgeon Tracy Putnam. The study was conducted on the brain of a patient with multiple sclerosis, resulting in new information on how the disease affected the human body. Illustrations from the study are frequently used in medical literature.

In 1943, Adler studied survivors of the Cocoanut Grove nightclub fire of 1942. The study found that 50% of the survivors still experienced trauma and disturbances a year after the accident. These symptoms included changes in personality such as lack of sleep, anxiety, guilt and fears of the event. After observations and following up 46 patients of the acute stage, it was found that survivors were only recognizing parts of what happened. It was theorized that this was due to the stress or a possible lesion in the brain due to carbon monoxide exposure. Adler became one of the first neurologists to create a detailed documentation of what is known as post-traumatic stress disorder. Her findings allowed her to apply what she discovered to work with treatment for World War II Veterans, who potentially had PTSD.

In the 1950s and throughout the 1960s, Adler continued her father's work of Adlerian psychology for possible treatments for schizophrenia, neuroses, and personality disorders. She believed this could be done through modern drug treatment, group therapy, and the existentialist and religious psychotherapies.

== Personal life ==
Adler grew up in Vienna, Austria and would often play piano with her father, renowned psychologist Alfred Adler.

In 1959, Adler married Halfdan Gregerson, a former dean at Williams College.

She lived till the age of 99. She died on January 4, 2001, in New York City.

== Publications ==
Throughout Adler's career she published several peer reviewed articles as well as a memoir commemorating her father's 100 birth anniversary, "Recollections of My Father". Below is a list of her other publications related to her field of study.

Equine Encephalomyelitis in Man.

Influence of Early Experiences Upon the Formation of the Personalities.

Traumatic Carotid Artery Dissection During Acrobatic Flight Associated with -G(z) Acceleration.

She also authored several articles on the work of other psychiatrists such as Paul Schilder and delivered a lecture on suicide and drunkenness.
