= Rudolf Dreikurs =

Austrian psychiatrist and educator

- Born: February 8, 1897; Vienna, Austria-Hungary
- Died: May 25, 1972 (aged 75); Chicago, Illinois, U.S.
- Education: University of Vienna
- Known for: Individual psychology
- Scientific career
- Fields: Psychiatry

Rudolf Dreikurs (Austrian German: [ˈdraɪkʊrs]; February 8, 1897 – May 25, 1972) was an Austrian psychiatrist and educator who developed psychologist Alfred Adler's system of individual psychology into a pragmatic method for understanding the purposes of reprehensible behaviour in children and for stimulating cooperative behaviour without punishment or reward.

He suggested that human misbehavior is the result of feeling a lack of belonging to one's social group. When this happens, the child acts from one of four "mistaken goals": undue attention, power, revenge or avoidance (inadequacy). His overall goal was that students would learn to cooperate reasonably without being penalized or rewarded because they would feel that they are valuable contributors to the classroom.

In 1952, Dreikurs organized a group of followers of Adlerian psychology to found the North American Society of Adlerian Psychology. He was an active leader in the organization until his death. Dr. Eva Dreikurs Ferguson (1929–2025), the daughter of Stephanie (Koch) and Rudolf Dreikurs, was herself a clinical psychologist who continued her father's work in Adlerian psychology.

== Bibliography ==
- A Parent's Guide to Child Discipline by Rudolf Dreikurs and Loren Grey.
- The Challenge of Marriage.
- The Challenge of Parenthood.
- Children: The Challenge by Rudolf Dreikurs, Vicki Soltz. ISBN 978-0-470-83508-1
- Coping With Children's Misbehavior, a Parent's Guide.
- Discipline Without Tears by Rudolf Dreikurs, et al. ISBN 978-0-452-26898-2
- Encouraging Children to Learn by Rudolf Dreikurs, Don Sr. Dinkmeyer.
- Family council: the Dreikurs technique for putting an end to war between parents and children (and between children and children).
- Fundamentals of Adlerian Psychology.
- Maintaining Sanity in the Classroom: Classroom Management Techniques by Rudolf Dreikurs, et al.
- New Approach to Discipline: Logical Consequences.
- Psychology in the Classroom: A Manual for Teachers.
- Social Equality the Challenge of Today.

== See also ==
- Classical Adlerian psychology
- List of Austrian scientists
- List of Austrians

== Sources ==
- The Courage to Be Imperfect: The Life and Work of Rudolf Dreikurs. Biography by Janet Terner, W.L. Pew. New York, 1978.
- Rudolf Dreikurs — A Biographical Summary by Eva Dreikurs Ferguson, copyright 2008.
