= Pansexualism =

Hypothesis in psychology

Pansexualism is a hypothesis in psychology "that regards all desire and interest as derived from [the] sex instinct" or, in other words, "that the sex instinct plays the primary part in all human activity, mental and physical"

The above definition is one that stemmed from a misunderstanding of Freud's views on the role sexuality played in the formation of neuroses. His views were misunderstood and criticized, with others accusing him of pansexualism. In 1923, Freud wrote, ". . . it is a mistake to accuse psycho-analysis of 'pan-sexualism' and to allege that it drives all mental occurrences from sexuality and traces them all back to it. On the contrary, psycho-analysis has from the very first distinguished the sexual instincts [drives] from others which it has provisionally termed 'ego-instincts [drives]' . . . and even the neuroses it has traced back not to sexuality alone but to the conflict between the sexual impulses and the ego."

In the preface to the fourth edition of his Three Essays on the Theory of Sexuality, Sigmund Freud wrote, "People have gone so far in their search for high-sounding catchwords as to talk of the 'pan-sexualism’ of psycho-analysis and to raise the senseless charge against it of explaining ‘everything’ by sex. We might be astonished at this, if we ourselves could forget the way in which emotional factors make people confused and forgetful."

Johann Christoph Friedrich von Schiller used the term to explain the aesthetic and sensual civilization that reconciled sensuality with reason.

== See also ==
The dictionary definition of sometimes a cigar is just a cigar at Wiktionary
