= Alfred Adler =

Austrian psychotherapist (1870–1937)

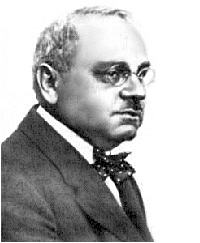
- Born: 7 February 1870; Rudolfsheim, Austria-Hungary (now Rudolfsheim-Fünfhaus, Vienna, Austria)
- Died: 28 May 1937 (aged 67); Aberdeen, Scotland
- Citizenship: Austria
- Education: University of Vienna
- Known for: Individual psychology Belonging; Gemeinschaftsgefühl; Social interest Birth order Inferiority complex Style of life
- Spouse: Raissa Epstein
- Children: Alexandra Adler, Kurt Alfred Adler, Valentine Adler, Cornelia Adler
- Scientific career
- Fields: Psychotherapist, psychiatrist

Alfred Adler (/ˈædlər/ AD-lər; Austrian German: [ˈalfreːd ˈaːdlɐ]; February 7, 1870 – May 28, 1937) was an Austrian medical doctor, psychotherapist, and founder of the school of individual psychology. His emphasis on the importance of feelings of belonging, relationships within the family, and birth order set him apart from Freud and others in their common circle. He proposed that contributing to others ("social interest" or Gemeinschaftsgefühl) was how the individual feels a sense of worth and belonging in the family and society. His earlier work focused on inferiority, coining the term "inferiority complex", an isolating element which he argued plays a key role in personality development. Adler considered a human being as an individual whole, and therefore he called his school of psychology Individual Psychology.

Adler was the first to emphasize the importance of the social element in the re-adjustment process of the individual and to carry psychiatry into the community. A Review of General Psychology survey, published in 2002, ranked Adler as the 67th most eminent psychologist of the 20th century.

== Early life ==
Adler was born on February 7, 1870 at Mariahilfer Straße 208 in Rudolfsheim, a village on the western fringes of Vienna, a modern part of Rudolfsheim-Fünfhaus, the 15th district of the city. He was second of the seven children of an Austrian-Jewish couple, Pauline (Beer) and Leopold Adler. Leopold was a grain merchant and came from a Hungarian-Jewish family. Alfred's younger brother died in the bed next to him when Alfred was only three years old, and throughout his childhood, he maintained a rivalry with his older brother. This rivalry was spurred on because Adler believed his mother preferred his brother over him. Despite his good relationship with his father, he still struggled with feelings of inferiority in his relationship with his mother.

Alfred was an active, popular child and an average student who was also known for the competitive attitude toward his older brother, Sigmund. Early on, he developed rickets, which kept Alfred from walking until he was four years old. At the age of four, he developed pneumonia and heard a doctor say to his father, "Your boy is lost". Along with being run over twice and witnessing his younger brother's death, this sickness contributed to his overall fear of death. At that point, he decided to be a physician. He was very interested in the subjects of psychology, sociology, and philosophy. After graduating from the University of Vienna in 1895, specialized as an eye doctor, and later in neurology and psychiatry.

== Career ==
Adler began his medical career as an ophthalmologist, but he soon switched to general practice, and established his surgery in a less affluent part of Vienna across from the Prater, a combination of amusement park and circus. His clients included circus people, and it has been suggested that the unusual strengths and weaknesses of the performers led to his insights into "organ inferiorities" and compensation.

In his early career, Adler wrote an article in defense of Sigmund Freud's theory after reading one of his most well known works, The Interpretation of Dreams. In 1902, because of his supportive article, Adler received an invitation from Freud to join a small, informal discussion group that included Max Kahane, Rudolf Reitler, and Wilhelm Stekel. The group, the "Wednesday Society" (Mittwochsgesellschaft), met regularly on Wednesday evenings at Freud's home and was the beginning of the psychoanalytic movement, expanding over time to include many more members. By 1906, membership stood at 17. Each week, a member would present a paper and after a short break of coffee, cakes, and cigars the group would discuss it. The main members were Fritz Wittels, Otto Rank, Max Eitingon, Karl Abraham, Hanns Sachs, Ernest Jones, Max Graf, and Sandor Ferenczi. In 1908, Adler presented his paper, "The aggressive instinct in life and in neurosis", at a time when Freud believed that early sexual development was the primary determinant of the making of character, with which Adler took issue. Adler proposed that the sexual and aggressive drives were "two originally separate instincts which merge later on". Freud at the time disagreed with this idea.

When Freud in 1920 proposed his dual instinct theory of libido and aggressive drives in Beyond the Pleasure Principle, without citing Adler, he was reproached that Adler had proposed the aggressive drive in his 1908 paper (Eissler, 1971). Freud later commented in a 1923 footnote he added to the Little Hans case that, "I have myself been obliged to assert the existence of an aggressive instinct" (1909, p. 140, 2), while pointing out that his conception of an aggressive drive differs from that of Adler. A long-serving member of the group, he made many more beyond this 1908 pivotal contribution to the group, and Adler became president of the Vienna Psychoanalytic Society eight years later (1910). He remained a member of the Society until 1911, when he and a group of his supporters formally disengaged from Freud's circle, the first of the great dissenters from orthodox psychoanalysis (preceding Carl Jung's split in 1914).

This departure suited both Freud and Adler, since they had grown to dislike each other. During his association with Freud, Adler frequently maintained his own ideas, which often diverged from Freud's. While Adler is often referred to as "a pupil of Freud", this was not true; they were colleagues, Freud referring to him in print in 1909 as "My colleague Dr Alfred Adler". The association of Adler and Freud lasted a total of nine years, and they never saw each other after the separation. Freud continued to dislike Adler even after the separation and tended to do so with other defectors from psychoanalysis. Even after Adler's death, Freud maintained his distaste for him. When conversing with a colleague over the matter, he stated, "I don't understand your sympathy for Adler. For a Jewish boy out of a Viennese suburb a death in Aberdeen is an unheard of career in itself and a proof of how far he had got on. The world really rewarded him richly for his service in having contradicted psychoanalysis."

Adler founded the Society for Individual Psychology in 1912, after his break from the psychoanalytic movement. Adler's group initially included some orthodox Nietzschean adherents (who believed Adler's ideas on power and inferiority were closer to Nietzsche than Freud's). Their enmity aside, Adler retained a lifelong admiration for Freud's ideas on dreams and credited him with creating a scientific approach to their clinical utilization (Fiebert, 1997). Nevertheless, even regarding dream interpretation, Adler had his own theoretical and clinical approach. The primary differences between Adler and Freud centered on Adler's contention that the social realm (exteriority) is as important to psychology as is the internal realm (interiority). The dynamics of power and compensation extend beyond sexuality; gender and politics can be as important as libido. Moreover, Freud did not share Adler's socialist beliefs, the latter's wife (Raissa Timofeyewna Epstein) being for example an intimate friend of many of the Russian Marxists such as Leon Trotsky.

In 1927, Adler entrusted the founding of the Adler's Society to Dimitrije Mitrinović, a Serbian philosopher, revolutionary, and mystic.

In Berlin, in summer 1930, Adler met with English occultist Aleister Crowley. Their connection was through Karl Germer, a German and American businessman and occultist known as Frater Saturnus, who was one of Adler's patients. Crowley later claimed to "know [Adler] personally" and even to have "handled" some of his Berlin patients and to have "put a lot of my own theory and practice into it."

== The Adlerian school ==
Following Adler's break from Freud, he enjoyed considerable success and celebrity in building an independent school of psychotherapy and a unique personality theory. He traveled and lectured for a period of 25 years promoting his socially oriented approach. His intent was to build a movement that would rival, even supplant, others in psychology by arguing for the holistic integrity of psychological well-being with that of social equality. Adler's efforts were halted by World War I (1914–1918), during which he served as a doctor with the Austro-Hungarian Army, first on the Russian front and then at a children's hospital.

After the conclusion of the war, Adler's influence increased greatly. In 1919, he started the first Child Guidance clinic in Vienna. With the collapse of the Austro-Hungarian Empire, the Social Democratic Party of Austria came to power in the newly-formed Austrian Republic. The Social Democrats supported welfare programs with a particular focus on childhood educational reform. The resulting climate enabled Adler and his associates to establish 28 child guidance clinics, and Vienna became the first city in the world to provide schoolchildren with free educational therapy.

From 1921 onwards, Adler was a frequent lecturer in Europe and then the United States in 1926, becoming a visiting professor at Columbia University in 1927. His clinical treatment methods for adults were aimed at uncovering the hidden purpose of symptoms using the therapeutic functions of insight and meaning. Adler was concerned with overcoming the superiority/inferiority dynamic, and was one of the first psychotherapists to discard the analytic couch in favor of two chairs. This allows the clinician and the patient to sit together more or less as equals.

Adler's clinical methods, which include "Adlerian therapy" or individual psychology, are not limited to treatment after-the-fact but extend to the realm of prevention by preempting future problems in the child. Prevention strategies include encouraging and promoting social interest, belonging, and a cultural shift within families and communities that leads to the eradication of pampering and neglect, and especially corporal punishment.

Adler often wrote for the lay public, and his popularity was related to the relative optimism and comprehensibility of his ideas. Adler always retained a pragmatic approach that was task-oriented. These "Life tasks" are occupation/work, society/friendship, and love/sexuality. Their success depends on cooperation. The tasks of life are not to be considered in isolation since, as Adler famously commented, "they all throw cross-lights on one another".

In his bestselling book, Man's Search for Meaning, Dr. Viktor E. Frankl compared his own "Third Viennese School of Psychotherapy" (after Freud's and Adler's schools) to Adler's analysis:

According to logotherapy, the striving to find a meaning in one's life is the primary motivational force in man. That is why I speak of a will to meaning in contrast to the "pleasure principle" (or, as we could also term it, the will to pleasure) on which Freudian psychoanalysis is centered, as well as in contrast to the will to power on which Adlerian psychology, using the term "striving for superiority," is focused.

== Emigration ==
In the early 1930s, most of Adler's Austrian clinics had been closed due to his Jewish heritage. Some claim he had converted to Christianity, but no sources were found to sustain this claim, and all indicates he remained ethnically Jewish through his life, his wife being Jewish too, so antisemitic policies affected them. Adler thus left Austria for a professorship at the Long Island College of Medicine in the US, in 1934.

== Basic principles ==
Adler was influenced by the mental construct ideas of the philosopher Hans Vaihinger (The Philosophy of 'As if') and the literature of Dostoyevsky. While still a member of the Vienna Psychoanalytic Society, he developed a theory of organic inferiority and compensation that was the prototype for his later turn to phenomenology and the development of his famous concept, the inferiority complex.

Adler was also influenced by the philosophies of Immanuel Kant, Friedrich Nietzsche, Rudolf Virchow, and the statesman Jan Smuts (who coined the term "holism"). Adler's School, known as "Individual Psychology"—an arcane reference to the Latin individuals meaning indivisibility, a term intended to emphasize holism—is both a social and community psychology as well as a depth psychology. Adler was an early advocate in psychology for prevention and emphasized the training of parents, teachers, social workers, and so on in democratic approaches that allow a child to exercise their power through reasoned decision making whilst co-operating with others. He was a social idealist, and was known as a socialist in his early years of association with psychoanalysis (1902–1911).

Adler was pragmatic and believed that lay people could make practical use of the insights of psychology. Adler was also an early supporter of feminism in psychology and the social world, believing that feelings of superiority and inferiority were often gendered and expressed symptomatically in characteristic masculine and feminine styles. These styles could form the basis of psychic compensation and lead to mental health difficulties. Adler also spoke of "safeguarding tendencies" and neurotic behavior long before Anna Freud wrote about the same phenomena in her book The Ego and the Mechanisms of Defense.

Adlerian-based scholarly, clinical, and social practices focus on the following topics:

- Social interest and community feeling
- Holism and the creative self
- Fictional finalism, teleology, and goal constructs
- Psychological and social encouragement
- Inferiority, superiority, and compensation
- Life style/style of life
- Early recollections (a projective technique)
- Family constellation and birth order
- Life tasks and social embeddedness
- The conscious and unconscious realms
- Private logic and common sense (based in part on Kant's "sensus communis")
- Symptoms and neurosis
- Safeguarding behavior
- Guilt and guilt feelings
- Socratic questioning
- Dream interpretation
- Child and adolescent psychology
- Democratic approaches to parenting and families
- Adlerian approaches to classroom management
- Leadership and organizational psychology

Adler created Adlerian Therapy, because he believed that one's psyche should be studied in the context of that person's environment.

=== Adler's approach to personality ===
In one of his earliest and most famous publications, Study of Organ Inferiority and Its Psychical Compensation, Adler outlined the basics for what would be the beginning foundation of his personality theory. The article focuses mainly on the topics of organ inferiority and compensation. Organ inferiority is when one organ, or portion of the body, is weaker than the rest. Adler postulated that the body's other organs would work together to compensate for the weakness of this "inferior" organ. When compensation occurs, other areas of the body make up for the function lacking in the inferior portion. In some cases, the weakness may be overcompensated, transforming it into a strength. An example would be an individual with a weak leg becoming a great runner later on. As his theory progressed, the idea of organ inferiority was replaced with feelings of inferiority instead and he continued evolving this theory and its key ideas.

Adler's book, Über den nervösen Charakter (The Neurotic Character), defines his earlier key ideas. He argued that human personality could be explained teleologically: parts of the individual's unconscious self ideally work to convert feelings of inferiority to superiority (or rather completeness). The desires of the self ideal were countered by social and ethical demands. If the corrective factors were disregarded and the individual overcompensated, then an inferiority complex would occur, fostering the danger of the individual becoming egocentric, power-hungry and aggressive, or worse.

Common therapeutic tools include the use of humor, historical instances, and paradoxical injunctions.

=== Psychodynamics and teleology ===
Adler maintained that human psychology is psychodynamic in nature. Unlike Freud's metapsychology that emphasizes instinctual demands, human psychology is guided by goals and fueled by a yet unknown creative force. Like Freud's instincts, Adler's fictive goals are largely unconscious. These goals have a "teleological" function. Constructivist Adlerians, influenced by neo-Kantian and Nietzschean ideas, view these "teleological" goals as "fictions" in the sense that Hans Vaihinger spoke of (fictio). Usually, there is a fictional final goal which can be deciphered alongside of innumerable sub-goals. The inferiority/superiority dynamic is constantly at work through various forms of compensation and overcompensation. For example, in anorexia nervosa the fictive final goal is to "be perfectly thin" (overcompensation on the basis of a feeling of inferiority). Hence, the fictive final goal can serve a persecutory function that is ever-present in subjectivity (though its trace springs are usually unconscious). The end goal of being "thin" is fictive, however, since it can never be subjectively achieved.

Teleology serves another vital function for Adlerians. Chilon of Sparta's "hora telos" ("see the end, consider the consequences") provides for both healthy and maladaptive psychodynamics. Here we also find Adler's emphasis on personal responsibility in mentally healthy subjects who seek their own and the social good.

=== Constructivism and metaphysics ===
As a psychodynamic system, Adlerians excavate the past of a client/patient in order to alter their future and increase integration into community in the 'here-and-now'. The 'here-and-now' aspects are especially relevant to those Adlerians who emphasize humanism and/or existentialism in their approaches.

=== Holism ===
Metaphysical Adlerians emphasize a spiritual holism in keeping with what Jan Smuts articulated (Smuts coined the term "holism"), that is, the spiritual sense of one-ness that holism usually implies (etymology of holism: from ὅλος "holos," a Greek word meaning all, entire, total). Smuts believed that evolution involves a progressive series of lesser wholes integrating into larger ones. Whilst Smuts' text Holism and Evolution is thought to be a work of science, it actually attempts to unify evolution with a higher metaphysical principle (holism). The sense of connection and one-ness revered in various religious traditions (among these, Christianity, Judaism, Islam, Buddhism, and Hinduism) finds a strong complement in Adler's thought.

The pragmatic and materialist aspects to contextualizing members of communities, the construction of communities, and the socio-historical-political forces that shape communities matter a great deal when it comes to understanding an individual's psychological make-up and functioning. This aspect of Adlerian psychology holds a high level of synergy with the field of community psychology, especially given Adler's concern for what he called "the absolute truth and logic of communal life". However, Adlerian psychology, unlike community psychology, is holistically concerned with both prevention and clinical treatment after-the-fact. Hence, Adler can be considered the "first community psychologist", a discourse that formalized in the decades following Adler's death (King & Shelley, 2008).

Adlerian psychology, Carl Jung's analytical psychology, Gestalt therapy, and Karen Horney's psychodynamic approach are holistic schools of psychology. These discourses eschew a reductive approach to understanding human psychology and psychopathology.

=== Typology ===
Adler developed a scheme of so-called personality types, which were however always to be taken as provisional or heuristic since he did not, in essence, believe in personality types, and at different times proposed different and equally tentative systems. The danger with typology is to lose sight of the individual's uniqueness and to gaze reductively, acts that Adler opposed. Nevertheless, he intended to illustrate patterns that could denote a characteristic governed under the overall style of life. Hence American Adlerians, such as Harold Mosak, have made use of Adler's typology in this provisional sense:

- The Getting or Leaning type are sensitive people who have developed a shell around themselves which protects them, but they must rely on others to carry them through life's difficulties. They have low energy levels and so become dependent. When overwhelmed, they develop what we typically think of as neurotic symptoms: phobias, obsessions and compulsions, general anxiety, hysteria, amnesias, and so on, depending on individual details of their lifestyle.
- The Avoiding types are those that hate being defeated. They may be successful, but have not taken any risks getting there. They are likely to have low social contact in fear of rejection or defeat in any way.
- The Ruling or Dominant type strive for power and are willing to manipulate situations and people, anything to get their way. People of this type are also prone to anti-social behavior.
- The Socially Useful types are those who are very outgoing and very active. They have a lot of social contact and strive to make changes for the good.

These 'types' are typically formed in childhood and are expressions of the Style of Life.

=== The importance of memories ===
Adler placed great emphasis on the interpretation of early memories in working with patients and school children, writing that, "Among all psychic expressions, some of the most revealing are the individual's memories." Adler viewed memories as expressions of "private logic" and as metaphors for an individual's personal philosophy of life or "lifestyle". He maintained that memories are never incidental or trivial; rather, they are chosen reminders: "(A person's) memories are the reminders she carries about with her of her limitations and of the meanings of events. There are no 'chance' memories. Out of the incalculable number of impressions that an individual receives, she chooses to remember only those which she considers, however dimly, to have a bearing on her problems."

=== On birth order ===
Adler emphasized birth order as having an influence on the style of life and the strengths and weaknesses in one's psychological makeup. Birth order refers to the placement of siblings within the family. Adler distinguished between psychological and ordinal birth order (e.g., a second child might behave like a firstborn, in which case they are considered to be an ordinal secondborn but a psychological firstborn). Adler believed that the firstborn child would be in a favorable position, enjoying the full attention of new parents, until the arrival of a second child. This second child would cause the firstborn to suffer feelings of "dethronement," no longer being the center of attention.

In early writings (1908), Adler suggested that in a three-child family, the oldest child would be the most likely to suffer from neuroticism and substance addiction, reasoning that this was a compensation for the feelings of excessive responsibility and the loss of their pampered position. Youngest children would tend to be overindulged, leading to poor social empathy. Consequently, the middle child, who would experience neither dethronement nor overindulgence, was most likely to develop into a successful individual yet also most likely to be a rebel and to feel "squeezed-out."

Adler did not produce scientific support for his interpretations on birth order roles. The value of the hypothesis was to extend the importance of siblings in marking the psychology of the individual beyond Freud's limited emphasis on the parents. Hence, Adlerians utilize the concept to map the influence that siblings (or lack thereof) had on the psychology of their clients. The idiographic approach entails an examination of the phenomenology of one's birth order position for likely influence on the subject's Style of Life. The subjective experiences of sibling positionality and inter-relations are significant for Adlerian therapists, rather than the specific predictions that may or may not have been objectively true in Adler's time.

For Adler, birth order answered the question, "Why do children, who are raised in the same family, grow up with very different personalities?" Adler argued that children do not grow up in the same shared environment; the oldest child grows up in a family where they have younger siblings, the middle child with older and younger siblings, and the youngest with older siblings. The position in the family constellation, Adler argued, is the reason for these differences in personality, a point later taken up by Eric Berne.

=== On addiction ===
Adler's insight into birth order, compensation, and issues relating to the individuals' perception of community also led him to investigate the causes and treatment of substance abuse disorders, particularly alcoholism and morphinism, which were already serious social problems of his time. Adler's work with addicts was significant since most other prominent proponents of psychoanalysis invested relatively little time and thought into these widespread ills of the modern and post-modern age. In addition to applying his individual psychology approach of organ inferiority, for example, to the onset and causes of addictive behaviors, he also tried to find a clear relationship of drug cravings to sexual gratification or their substitutions. Early pharmaco-therapeutic interventions with non-addictive substances, such as neuphyllin were used, since withdrawal symptoms were explained by a form of "water-poisoning" that made the use of diuretics necessary.

Adler and his wife's pragmatic approach, and the seemingly high success rates of their treatment, were based on their ideas of social functioning and well-being. Life style choices and situations were emphasized, for example the need for relaxation or the negative effects of early childhood conflicts were examined, which compared to other authoritarian or religious treatment regimens, were modern approaches. Certainly some of his observations, for example that psychopaths were more likely to be drug addicts, are not compatible with current methodologies and theories of substance abuse treatment, but the self-centered attributes of the illness and the clear escapism from social responsibilities by pathological addicts put Adler's treatment modalities clearly into a modern contextual reasoning.

=== On homosexuality ===
Adler's ideas regarding non-heterosexual sexuality and various social forms of deviance have long been controversial. Adler had classified 'homosexuals' as falling among the "failures of life" and framed homosexuality as a lack of social interest and a choice. In 1917, he began his writings on homosexuality with a 52-page magazine, and sporadically published more thoughts throughout his life.

The Dutch psychologist Gerard J. M. van den Aardweg underlines how Alfred Adler came to his conclusions for, in 1917, Adler believed that he had established a connection between homosexuality and an inferiority complex towards one's own gender. This point of view differed from Freud's theory that homosexuality is rooted in narcissism or Jung's view of expressions of contrasexuality vis-à-vis the archetypes of the Anima and Animus.

There is evidence that Adler may have moved toward abandoning the hypothesis. Near the end of Adler's life, in the mid-1930s, his opinion toward homosexuality began to shift. Elizabeth H. McDowell, a New York state family social worker recalls undertaking supervision with Adler on a young man who was "living in sin" with an older man in New York City. Adler asked her, "Is he happy, would you say?" "Oh yes," McDowell replied. Adler then stated, "Well, why don't we leave him alone."

According to novelist Phyllis Bottome, who wrote Adler's Biography (after Adler himself laid that task upon her):

"He always treated homosexuality as lack of courage. These were but ways of obtaining a slight release for a physical need while avoiding a greater obligation. A transient partner of your own sex is a better known road and requires less courage than a permanent contact with an "unknown" sex.... Adler taught that men cannot be judged from within by their "possessions," as he used to call nerves, glands, traumas, drives et cetera, since both judge and prisoner are liable to misconstrue what is invisible and incalculable; but that he can be judged, with no danger from introspection, by how he measures up to the three common life tasks set before every human being between the cradle and the grave: work (employment), love or marriage (intimacy), and social contact (friendships.)"

=== Parent education ===
Adler emphasized both treatment and prevention. With regard to psychodynamic psychology, Adlerians emphasize the foundational importance of childhood in developing personality and any tendency toward various forms of psychopathology. The best way to inoculate against what are now termed "personality disorders" (what Adler had called the "neurotic character"), or a tendency to various neurotic conditions (depression, anxiety, etc.), is to train a child to be and feel an equal part of the family.

The responsibility of the optimal development of the child is not limited to the mother or father, but rather includes teachers and society more broadly. Adler argued therefore that teachers, nurses, social workers, and so on require training in parent education to complement the work of the family in fostering a democratic character. When a child does not feel equal and is enacted upon (abused through pampering or neglect), he or she is likely to develop inferiority or superiority complexes and various concomitant compensation strategies. These strategies exact a social toll by seeding higher divorce rates, the breakdown of the family, criminal tendencies, and subjective suffering in the various guises of psychopathology. Adlerians have long promoted parent education groups, especially those influenced by the famous Austrian/American Adlerian Rudolf Dreikurs (Dreikurs & Soltz, 1964).

=== Spirituality, ecology and community ===
In a late work, Social Interest: A Challenge to Mankind (1938), Adler turns to the subject of metaphysics, where he integrates Jan Smuts' evolutionary holism with the ideas of teleology and community: "sub specie aeternitatis". Unabashedly, he argues his vision of society: "Social feeling means above all a struggle for a communal form that must be thought of as eternally applicable... when humanity has attained its goal of perfection... an ideal society amongst all mankind, the ultimate fulfillment of evolution." Adler follows this pronouncement with a defense of metaphysics:

I see no reason to be afraid of metaphysics; it has had a great influence on human life and development. We are not blessed with the possession of absolute truth; on that account we are compelled to form theories for ourselves about our future, about the results of our actions, etc. Our idea of social feeling as the final form of humanity – of an imagined state in which all the problems of life are solved and all our relations to the external world rightly adjusted – is a regulative ideal, a goal that gives our direction. This goal of perfection must bear within it the goal of an ideal community, because all that we value in life, all that endures and continues to endure, is eternally the product of this social feeling.

This social feeling for Adler is Gemeinschaftsgefühl, a community feeling whereby one feels he or she belongs with others and has also developed an ecological connection with nature (plants, animals, the crust of this earth) and the cosmos as a whole, sub specie aeternitatis.

== Use of Adler's work without attribution ==
Much of Adler's theorizing has been absorbed into modern psychology without attribution. Psychology historian Henri F. Ellenberger writes, "It would not be easy to find another author from which so much has been borrowed on all sides without acknowledgement than Alfred Adler." Ellenberger posits several theories for "the discrepancy between greatness of achievement, massive rejection of person and work, and wide-scale, quiet plagiarism..." These include Adler's "imperfect" style of writing and demeanor, his "capacity to create a new obviousness," and his lack of a large and well-organized following.

== Influence on depth psychology ==
In collaboration with Sigmund Freud and a small group of Freud's colleagues, Adler was among the co-founders of the psychoanalytic movement and a core member of the Vienna Psychoanalytic Society. To Freud, Adler was "the only personality there". He was the first major figure to break away from psychoanalysis to form an independent school of psychotherapy and personality theory, which he called individual psychology because he believed every human to be an indivisible whole, an individuum. He also imagined a person to be connected or associated with the surrounding world.

This was after Freud declared Adler's ideas as too contrary, leading to an ultimatum to all members of the Society (which Freud had shepherded) to drop Adler or be expelled, disavowing the right to dissent (Makari, 2008). Nevertheless, Freud took Adler's ideas seriously, calling them "honorable errors". Following this split, Adler would come to have an enormous, independent effect on the disciplines of counseling and psychotherapy as they developed over the course of the 20th century (Ellenberger, 1970). He influenced notable figures in subsequent schools of psychotherapy such as Rollo May, Viktor Frankl, Abraham Maslow, and Albert Ellis. His writings preceded, and were at times surprisingly consistent with, later Neo-Freudian insights such as those evidenced in the works of Otto Rank, Karen Horney, Harry Stack Sullivan, and Erich Fromm, some considering that it would take several decades for Freudian ego psychology to catch up with Adler's ground-breaking approach.

Adler emphasized the importance of equality in preventing various forms of psychopathology, and espoused the development of social interest and democratic family structures for raising children. His most famous concept is the inferiority complex, which speaks to the problem of self-esteem and its negative effects on human health (e.g., sometimes producing a paradoxical superiority striving). His emphasis on power dynamics is rooted in the philosophy of Nietzsche, whose works were published a few decades before Adler's. Specifically, Adler's conceptualization of the "Will to Power" focuses on the individual's creative power to change for the better.

Adler argued for holism, viewing the individual holistically rather than reductively, the latter being the dominant lens for viewing human psychology. Adler was also among the first in psychology to argue in favor of feminism, and the female analyst, making the case that power dynamics between men and women (and associations with masculinity and femininity) are crucial to understanding human psychology (Connell, 1995).

Adler is considered, along with Freud and Jung, to be one of the three founding figures of depth psychology, which emphasizes the unconscious and psychodynamics (Ellenberger, 1970; Ehrenwald, 1991). He is also considered by some to be one of the greatest psychologists and philosophers of the 20th century.

== Personal life ==
During his college years, he had become attached to a group of socialist students, among which he had found his wife-to-be, Raissa Timofeyewna Epstein, an intellectual and social activist from Russia studying in Vienna. Because Raissa was a militant socialist, she had a large impact on Adler's early publications and ultimately his theory of personality. They married in 1897 and had four children, two of whom, his daughter Alexandra and his son Kurt, became psychiatrists. Their children were writer, psychiatrist, and socialist activist Alexandra Adler; psychiatrist Kurt Adler; writer and activist Valentine Adler; and Cornelia "Nelly" Adler. Raissa, Adler's wife, died at age 89 in New York City on April 21, 1962.

Author and journalist Margot Adler (1946–2014) was Adler's granddaughter.

== Death and cremation ==
Adler died from a heart attack in 1937 in Aberdeen, Scotland, during a lecture tour. While walking down a street, Adler was seen to collapse and lie motionless on the pavement. As a man ran over to him and loosened his collar, Adler mumbled "Kurt", the name of his son, and died. The autopsy performed determined his death was caused by a degeneration of the heart muscle.

Adler's remains were cremated at Warriston Crematorium in Edinburgh, but the ashes were never claimed. In 2007, his ashes were rediscovered in a casket at Warriston Crematorium and returned to Vienna for burial in 2011.

== Legacy ==
Adler's death was a temporary blow to the influence of his ideas, although a number of them were subsequently taken up by neo-Freudians. Through the work of Rudolf Dreikurs in the US and many other adherents worldwide, Adlerian ideas and approaches remain strong and viable more than 80 years after his death.

Around the world, there are various organizations promoting Adler's orientation toward mental and social well-being. These include the International Committee of Adlerian Summer Schools and Institutes (ICASSI), the North American Society of Adlerian Psychology (NASAP) and the International Association for Individual Psychology. Teaching institutes and programs exist in Austria, Canada, England, Germany, Greece, Israel, Italy, Japan, Latvia, Switzerland, the US, Jamaica, Peru, and Wales.

== Artistic and cultural references ==
The two main characters in the novel Plant Teacher engage in a session of Adlerian lifestyle interpretation, including early memory interpretation.

In the episode Something About Dr. Mary of the television series Frasier, Frasier recalls having to "pass under a dangerously unbalanced portrait of Alfred Adler" during his studies at Harvard.

He appears as a character in the Young Indiana Jones Chronicles television series.

== English-language Adlerian journals ==
=== North America ===
- The Journal of Individual Psychology (University of Texas Press)
- The Canadian Journal of Adlerian Psychology (Adlerian Psychology Association of British Columbia)

=== United Kingdom ===
- Adlerian Yearbook (Adlerian Society, UK)

== Publications ==
Alfred Adler's key publications were The Practice and Theory of Individual Psychology (1924), Understanding Human Nature (1927), and What Life Could Mean to You (1931). Other important publications are The Pattern of Life (1930), The Science of Living (1930), The Neurotic Constitution (1917), The Problems of Neurosis (1930). In his lifetime, Adler published more than 300 books and articles.

=== The Collected Clinical Works of Alfred Adler ===
The Alfred Adler Institute of Northwestern Washington published a twelve-volume set, The Collected Clinical Works of Alfred Adler, covering his writings from 1898 to 1937. An entirely new translation of Adler's magnum opus, The Neurotic Character, is featured in Volume 1. Volume 12 provides comprehensive overviews of Adler's mature theory and contemporary Adlerian practice.

- Volume 1: The Neurotic Character — 1907
- Volume 2: Journal Articles 1898–1909
- Volume 3: Journal Articles 1910–1913
- Volume 4: Journal Articles 1914–1920
- Volume 5: Journal Articles 1921–1926
- Volume 6: Journal Articles 1927–1931
- Volume 7: Journal Articles 1931–1937
- Volume 8: Lectures to Physicians & Medical Students
- Volume 9: Case Histories
- Volume 10: Case Readings & Demonstrations
- Volume 11: Education for Prevention
- Volume 12: The General System of Individual Psychology

=== Other key Adlerian texts ===
- Adler, A. (1964). The Individual Psychology of Alfred Adler. H. L. Ansbacher and R. R. Ansbacher (Eds.). New York: Harper Torchbooks. ISBN 0-06-131154-5.
- Adler, A. (1979). Superiority and Social Interest: A Collection of Later Writings. H. L. Ansbacher and R. R. Ansbacher (Eds.). New York, NY: W. W. Norton. ISBN 0-393-00910-6.

== See also ==
- Adlerian
- Classical Adlerian psychology
- Neo-Adlerian
