= Individual psychology =

School of psychology founded by Alfred Adler

Individual psychology (German: Individualpsychologie) is a psychological method and school of thought founded by the Austrian psychiatrist Alfred Adler. The English edition of Adler's work on the subject, The Practice and Theory of Individual Psychology (1924), collects papers and lectures given mainly between 1912 and 1914.

Adler formulated a personality theory that emphasizes the social and contextual origins of behavior: the circumstances into which a person is born and grows shape personality development and life goals.

In developing individual psychology Adler broke with Sigmund Freud's psychoanalytic school and established an independent approach that emphasized social factors, goals, and a holistic understanding of the person rather than Freudian drives. Adler initially described his work as "free psychoanalysis" but later rejected the label "psychoanalysis" for his method, preferring the term individual psychology to stress the indivisibility of the person.

The term "individual" signals Adler's insistence that a person be treated as a unified, goal-directed whole rather than as a set of conflicting drives or parts. Individual psychology also stresses humans' social embeddedness: wellbeing is linked to belonging and contribution to the community — a concept Adler called "social interest" (Gemeinschaftsgefühl).

== Adler's psychology ==
Adler's model departs from Freudian emphasis on sex and libido and instead focuses on how individuals evaluate and respond to their world, particularly the social, vocational, and love-related demands they encounter. Adler argued that people confront three major life tasks — society (community), work (occupation), and love (relationships) — and that how they meet these tasks shapes personality.

Adler emphasized the role of early experiences (including unwanted children, organ inferiority, and birth order) in forming a person's subjective goals and lifestyle, though he also emphasized the individual's creative capacity in shaping their life.

=== The theory of compensation, resignation, and over-compensation ===
Adler proposed that feelings of inferiority are central motivational forces. People develop strategies to compensate for perceived weaknesses; these strategies may be adaptive or maladaptive depending on the individual's goals and social connectedness.

==== Compensation ====
Adler introduced the concept of compensation as efforts to counteract physical or psychological deficiencies. He regarded neurotic behaviors at times as defensive or compensatory reactions to perceived inferiority.

Sofie Lazarsfeld, a student influenced by Adler, argued that typical development includes encouragement, persistence, and cooperation; but in adverse conditions, children may overcompensate and develop problematic striving that can lead to psychological difficulties.

==== Resignation ====
Some individuals respond to perceived inadequacy by resigning themselves to limitations, withdrawing from challenges and opportunities for growth.

==== Over-compensation ====
Over-compensation occurs when efforts to overcome perceived inferiority become excessive; historically-cited examples (e.g. Demosthenes' intensive training to overcome a speech defect) illustrate how compensation can produce notable achievement, but Adler warned that pathological over-compensation can become neurotic.

=== Primary and secondary feelings of inferiority ===
Adler distinguished primary feelings of inferiority (normal infant/child experiences of smallness and dependency) from secondary inferiority (adult feelings of insufficiency resulting from unrealistic goals). An inferiority complex describes a persistent, maladaptive sense of inadequacy that affects functioning.

=== Feeling of community ===
Gemeinschaftsgefühl (community feeling or social interest) is a core Adlerian construct encompassing affective, cognitive, and behavioral elements: feeling connected to humanity, recognizing interdependence, and acting for the common good. Adler increasingly emphasized this construct in his later writings.

=== Withdrawal ===
Adler described withdrawal as retreat into a private fantasy of superiority — a "final compensation" or secret life plan — that protects the fragile ego but is fragile and vulnerable to internal tension and external challenge.

=== Holism ===
Adler's emphasis on the indivisibility of the person — viewing the personality as a unified, goal-directed whole — distinguishes his approach and places importance on the interaction of biological and social factors in personality formation.

== Classical Adlerian psychology today ==
Adlerian ideas continue to influence psychotherapy practice and theory. Contemporary Adlerian organizations and training institutes apply Adler's teachings in psychotherapy, education, and community programs, often integrating Adlerian principles with other therapeutic approaches. Henri Ellenberger described the gradual penetration of Adlerian insights into modern psychological thought.

=== Striving for significance ===
Adlerian theory proposes that behavior is oriented toward growth and the pursuit of significance and belonging. Striving can be constructive (toward social usefulness) or destructive (toward power over others) depending on goals and social interest.

=== Style of life ===
The style of life denotes the individual's characteristic pattern of goals, worldview, and strategies for achieving goals. It is formed early and organizes behavior across relationships, work, and love.

=== Fictional final goal ===
Adler proposed that people create a fictional final goal — a future-oriented ideal that organizes behavior. This "final cause" guides actions and gives subjective meaning to striving and compensation.

=== Private logic and safeguarding tendencies ===
Private logic refers to the idiosyncratic reasoning that justifies an individual's lifestyle; safeguarding tendencies are cognitive or behavioral strategies (e.g., symptoms, aggression, withdrawal) used to protect fragile self-esteem and avoid failure.

== Classical Adlerian psychotherapy ==
Classical Adlerian psychotherapy can be individual, couple, or family therapy and typically follows a growth-oriented, encouragement-based model. Techniques include Socratic questioning, interpretation of life tasks and early recollections, role-playing, guided imagery, and "prescription" of the symptom to reduce its effectiveness.

A common six-phase outline used by classical Adlerian clinicians includes establishing rapport and assessment, promoting insight into the life plan, encouraging corrective experiences, challenging private logic, and reinforcing social interest and community engagement.

== Uses ==
=== Individual ===
Classical Adlerian therapy is used with individuals across the lifespan and is adaptable to both brief and longer-term formats.

=== Teacher education and parent/family programs ===
Adlerian principles have been applied in teacher-training programs, parent education, and couple-enrichment workshops aimed at increasing cooperation, democratic childrearing, and improved family functioning.

== Contemporary techniques and schools ==
Two main contemporary currents exist: those directly following classical Adlerian practice and those influenced by Rudolf Dreikurs, who popularized Adlerian ideas in the United States and emphasized social belonging and democratic approaches to education and parenting.

== Notable Adlerian psychologists ==
Notable figures associated with Adlerian theory include Alexandra Adler, Heinz Ansbacher, Rudolf Dreikurs, Sofie Lazarsfeld, Harold Mosak (1921-2018, cofounder of the Alfred Adler Institute), Henry T. Stein (b. 1932, leading US Classical Adlerian psychotherapist, director of The Adlerian Translation Project), and others who developed or applied Adler's ideas in clinical, educational, and social contexts.

== Works ==
- Adler, A., Über den nervösen Charakter: Grundzüge einer vergleichenden Individual-Psychologie und Psychotherapie (1912).
- Adler, A., Praxis und Theorie der Individual-Psychologie (1919–1930).
- Adler, A., The Practice and Theory of Individual Psychology (1924).
- Adler, A., Problems of Neurosis: A Book of Case-Histories (1929).
- Ansbacher, H. L.; Ansbacher, R. R., eds., The Individual Psychology of Alfred Adler (1956).

== Criticism ==
Karl Popper and others have criticized Adlerian psychology (like psychoanalysis) as unfalsifiable and thus problematic from the perspective of a rigorous philosophy of science. In Popper's essay "Science: Conjectures and Refutations", Adler's individual psychology is compared - along with Freudian and Marxist theory - to astrology in that the vagueness of the theory and a culture of confirmation bias encourage adherents to continually (re)interpret the theory to align it with new evidence. The implication being that such theory and "clinical observations" supporting the theory, is pseudoscientific.

== See also ==
- Classical Adlerian psychology
- Classical Adlerian psychotherapy
- North American Society of Adlerian Psychology
- Alfred Adler
- Karl Popper
- Rudolf Dreikurs
- Style of life
- Sigmund Freud
- Pseudoscience
