= Impact of the COVID-19 pandemic on suicide rates =

Suicide cases have remained constant or decreased since the outbreak of the COVID-19 pandemic. According to a study done on twenty-one high and upper-middle-income countries in April–July 2020, the number of suicides has remained static. These results were attributed to a variety of factors, including the composition of mental health support, financial assistance, having families and communities work diligently to care for at-risk individuals, discovering new ways to connect through the use of technology, and having more time spent with family members which aided in the strengthening of their bonds. Despite this, there has been an increase in isolation, fear, stigma, abuse, and economic fallout as a result of COVID-19. Self-reported levels of depression, anxiety, and suicidal thoughts were elevated during the initial stay-at-home periods, according to empirical evidence from several countries, but this does not appear to have translated into an increase in suicides.

According to surveys conducted across the United States in June 2020, 10.7 percent of adults aged 18 and up said they had seriously considered suicide in the previous 30 days. They ranged in age from 18 to 24 and were classified as members of minority racial/ethnic groups, unpaid caregivers, and essential workers.

Few studies have been conducted to examine the impact of suicides on low- and lower-middle-income countries. According to the World Health Organization, "in 2016, low- and middle-income countries accounted for 79 percent of global suicides." This is because there are not enough high-quality vital registration systems, and even fewer collect real-time suicide data.

Myanmar and Tunisia, two lower-middle-income countries, were studied along with one low-income country, Malawi. It was found that: "In Malawi, there was reportedly a 57% increase in January–August 2020, compared with January–August 2019, and in Tunisia, there was a 5% increase in March–May 2020, compared with March–May, 2019. By contrast, in Myanmar, there was a 2% decrease in January–June 2020, compared with January–June 2019." It was informed that these changes could have been due to a lack of precise information since the beginning.

In spite of the fact that there is no increase in suicidal rates around many countries, mental health is still a prominent issue. COVID-19 has increased the risk of psychiatric disorders, chronic trauma, and stress, all of which can lead to suicide and suicidal behavior. According to studies conducted in China, the outbreak has had a significant impact on mental health, with an increase in health anxiety, acute stress reactions, adjustment disorders, depression, panic attacks, and insomnia. Relapses and increased hospitalization rates are occurring in cases of severe mental disorders, obsessive–compulsive disorder, and anxiety disorders, all of which include high risks of suicide. National surveys in China and Italy revealed a high prevalence of depression and anxiety in relation to COVID-19, both of which can act as independent risk factors for suicide.

When the economy is affected negatively, the suicide rate is higher than compared to periods of prosperity. Since the start of the COVID-19 pandemic, businesses were put on hold, many people have been laid off from work, and the stock market has experienced significant drops in history, all resulting in fear of the financial crisis.

Stigma is also identified as a primary cause of suicide. Frontline workers, the elderly, the homeless, migrants, and daily wage workers face unique challenges, making them more vulnerable. According to Somoy News, located in Bangladesh, a 36-year-old Bangladeshi man (Zahidul Islam, from the village of Ramchandrapur) died by suicide because he and his village mates suspected he was infected with COVID-19 due to his fever and cold symptoms, as well as his weight loss. He died from suicide by hanging himself from a tree because of the social avoidance and attitudes of those around him. A similar case was reported in India, on February 12, 2020; a victim, while returning from a city to his native village, died from suicide by hanging himself to prevent the spread of COVID-19 throughout the village. These cases were a result of xenophobia and stigma.

Suicides have increased for African Americans during the COVID-19 pandemic in the United States.
