= Relaxation technique =

Any method, process, procedure, or activity that helps a person to relax

- ICD-9-CM: 94.33

A relaxation technique (also known as relaxation training) is any method, process, procedure, or activity that helps a person to relax; attain a state of increased calmness; or otherwise reduce levels of pain, anxiety, stress or anger. Relaxation techniques are often employed as one element of a wider stress management program and can decrease muscle tension, lower blood pressure, and slow heart and breath rates, among other health benefits.

Relaxation therapy, the application of relaxation techniques, can be applied in various settings to complement treatment for stress, anxiety, depression, and pain. It addresses both psychological and physiological effects of stress such as increased heart rate, sweating, and muscle tension. There are many variations of relaxation techniques, including progressive muscle relaxation, autogenic training, guided imagery, biofeedback-assisted relaxation, and other techniques.

Thus, relaxation techniques are useful for either emotional pain caused by stress, anger, anxiety, and mood of depression, or chronic pain caused by strains, single-side muscle use, awkward position, restriction of movement in certain areas of the spine, improper form during physical activity, and stressful posture. Multiple relaxation techniques share a fundamental principle to decrease muscle tension and lower physical or mental pain.

Relaxation techniques are generally safe for healthy individuals. Occasional instances exist where individuals have reported negative experiences after receiving relaxation techniques.

== Background ==
Current and past researchers have explored the relationship between physical and mental disorders through various methods and investigated the effects of relaxation techniques. The subsequent literature review presents a brief and succinct overview of the latest research discoveries, providing a background for the understanding of relaxation techniques.

Claude Bernard, a scientist in 1865, observed that maintaining a constant internal environment, our internal milieu, when facing changes in external environment and conditions is critical for life and well-being.

Additionally, chronic stressors can have negative consequences, and they are especially prevalent in humans, potentially due to their high cognitive ability, which may cause ongoing stress responses to various adverse life and work circumstances. The connection between psychosocial stressors and chronic illness is intricate and influenced by various factors, such as the type, quantity, and duration of stressors, along with an individual's biological susceptibility (like genetics and inherent characteristics) and their learned ways of coping.

Previous studies have indicated that relaxation techniques, including but not limited to deep breathing, guided imagery, meditation, and progressive muscle relaxation, are effective ways to reduce stress, indicating that relaxation techniques are effective in promoting relaxation both physically and psychologically.

Research released in the 1980s indicated stronger ties between stress and health and showed benefits from a wider range of relaxation techniques than had been previously known. This research received national media attention, including a New York Times article in 1986.

A more recent study found that participants who practiced progressive muscle relaxation, deep breathing, and guided imagery experienced a statistically significant increase in relaxation compared to the control group. While there was no significant difference in relaxation levels before training, all intervention groups demonstrated significantly higher levels of relaxation after training compared to the control group. Additionally, there was a linear association between progressive muscle relaxation & guided imagery and physiological relaxation, while the deep breathing group initially showed increased physiological arousal before quickly returning to baseline levels. These findings support existing research findings on the effectiveness of relaxation techniques, which can effectively enhance relaxation states both psychologically and physiologically.

== Uses ==
People use relaxation techniques for the following reasons, among others:

- Anger management
- Anxiety attacks
- Cardiac health
- Childbirth
- Depression
- General well-being
- Headache
- High blood pressure
- Preparation for hypnosis
- Immune system support
- Insomnia
- Pain management
- Relaxation (psychology)
- Stress management
- Addiction treatment
- Nightmare disorder

Thus, relaxation techniques are used and designed to help individuals reduce tension and anxiety, both physically and psychologically, by inducing the body's "relaxation response," characterized by a slower respiratory rate, reduced blood pressure, and a slower heart rate. The main techniques are progressive muscle relaxation, autogenic training, guided imagery, and biofeedback-assisted relaxation.

== Techniques ==
=== Progressive muscle relaxation (PMR) ===
Progressive muscle relaxation (PMR) is one of the most important and easy-to-learn relaxation techniques developed by Dr. Edmund Jacobson in the 1920s, setting the foundation for the development of relaxation techniques. It involves the effective and repetitive relaxation of 14 different muscle groups and has been used to treat anxiety, tension headaches, migraines, TMJ, neck pain, insomnia, bipolar disorder, anxiety, backaches, high blood pressure, etc. PMR is a two-step practice that involves creating tension in specific muscle groups and then releasing it to build awareness of the sensations of tension and deep relaxation. It is recommended to repeat the process several times and to practice regularly to induce physical muscular relaxation at the first signs of stress.

After the initial practice of PMR, several muscle groups may still require additional tensing and relaxation to achieve maximum effects. Decreasing the degree of muscle tension is typically recommended by Dr. Edmund to "train" the body for immediate and continuous response.

The following steps are recommended to perform effective PMR.

1. First, to practice PMR, find a comfortable place where you will not be disturbed for 10-15 minutes.
2. Begin by focusing on each muscle group and tensing them for five seconds while breathing in, then releasing and relaxing the muscle while noticing the feeling of relaxation.
3. Repeat this process for each muscle group while gradually reducing the amount of tension used to deepen the sense of relaxation.
4. Transition to the next muscle group once you feel relaxed in the current one.
5. It is recommended to start at one part of the body and move systematically, and to not hold your breath or tense muscles that cause discomfort.

=== Guided imagery ===
Guided imagery (GI) is a well-established technique for reducing stress and anxiety. It involves replacing distressing memories with positive mental imagery through a process of sensory engagement and behavioral and physiological responses. The technique is guided by an instructor or audio recording that directs participants to imagine a peaceful or pleasant setting, often involving rich sensory experiences such as sounds, smells, and visual details.

By actively engaging the senses and focusing on specific contextual details, guided imagery enables individuals to generate vivid and realistic mental images that create a strong sense of presence and immersion in the imagined scenario, which helps to divert attention away from negative thoughts and feelings, and fosters a sense of relaxation and tranquility. When used in combination with progressive muscle relaxation (PMR), the PMR-GI approach is a highly effective method for managing the symptoms of nausea and vomiting, as well as improving patients' overall mental well-being.

==== Nature-based vs traditional GI ====
Studies have identified several connections between exposure to natural environments and health outcomes. Specifically, there is compelling evidence linking nature exposure to enhancements in cognitive function, brain activity, blood pressure, mental health, physical activity, and sleep. However, it may not always be feasible to alleviate anxiety symptoms by spending time in natural settings, depending on the situation and context. Studies have demonstrated that incorporating nature-based GI interventions can overcome the barriers of limited access to natural environments and enhance the effectiveness of GI interventions. Nature-based GI techniques have been shown to be highly effective in managing anxiety, while also offering the advantages of being affordable and highly accessible, providing a great alternative to traditional GI.

=== Biofeedback-related relaxation ===
Biofeedback is a technique that enables individuals to make subtle changes in their body, such as the relaxation of muscles, which can help alleviate pain and decrease tension. With the aid of an electronic device that provides feedback and real-time information on changes in heart rate, blood pressure, or muscle tension, individuals can learn to monitor their level of relaxation and recognize and regulate their body's response to stress. Biofeedback-related relaxation techniques are found by researchers to decrease test anxiety in nursing students, significantly reduce average blood glucose, A1C, muscle tension, and lower hypertension.

=== Other techniques ===
Various techniques are used by individuals to improve their state of relaxation. Some of the methods are performed alone; some require the help of another person (often a trained professional); some involve movement, some focus on stillness; while other methods involve different elements.

Certain relaxation techniques known as "formal and passive relaxation exercises" are generally performed while sitting or lying quietly, with minimal movement, and involve "a degree of withdrawal". These include:

- Autogenic training
- Biofeedback
- Deep breathing
- Guided imagery
- Hypnosis
- Meditation
- Pranayama
- Progressive muscle relaxation
- Qigong
- The Relaxation Response
- Transcendental Meditation technique
- Yoga Nidra
- Zen Yoga

Movement-based relaxation methods incorporate exercises such as walking, gardening, yoga, tai chi, qigong, and more. Some forms of bodywork are helpful in promoting a state of increased relaxation. Examples include massage, acupuncture, the Feldenkrais method, myotherapy, and reflexology

Some relaxation methods can also be used during other activities, for example, autosuggestion and prayer. At least one study has suggested that listening to certain types of music, particularly new-age music and classical music, can increase feelings associated with relaxation, such as peacefulness and a sense of ease.

A technique growing in popularity is flotation therapy, which is the use of a float tank in which a solution of Epsom salt is kept at skin temperature to provide effortless floating. Research in USA and Sweden has demonstrated a powerful and profound relaxation after twenty minutes. In some cases, floating may reduce pain and stress and has been shown to release endorphins.

Even actions as simple as a walk in the park have been shown to aid feelings of relaxation, regardless of the initial reason for the visit.

A new relaxation technique course, developed specifically for medical students in universities, was found to be effective in reducing anxiety, burnout, and depression, leading to significant improvements in academic performance and evaluated parameters. Introducing this particular course is important because the prevalence of stress-related mental disorders in medical students is significantly higher than in the general public.

== Side effects ==
Relaxation techniques are generally deemed safe for healthy individuals, with most research studies reporting no adverse side effects. However, there have been occasional instances where individuals have reported negative experiences such as heightened anxiety, intrusive thoughts, or fear of losing control.

In particular, some relaxation techniques may not be suitable for individuals with certain medical or psychiatric conditions. In rare cases, these techniques may even exacerbate existing symptoms. For instance, there have been reports that certain relaxation methods can trigger or worsen symptoms in individuals with epilepsy, psychiatric disorders, or a history of abuse or trauma.

== See also ==
- Biopsychosocial model
- Jane Madders — a 20th-century British physiotherapist and author who specialized in relaxation techniques
