= Jung's theory of neurosis =

Psychodynamic theory

Jung's theory of neurosis is based on the premise of a self-regulating psyche composed of tensions between opposing attitudes of the ego and the unconscious. A neurosis is a significant unresolved tension between these contending attitudes. Each neurosis is unique, and different things work in different cases, so no therapeutic method can be arbitrarily applied. Nevertheless, there is a set of cases that Jung especially addressed. Although adjusted well enough to everyday life, the individual has lost a fulfilling sense of meaning and purpose, and has no living religious belief to which to turn. There seems to be no readily apparent way to set matters right. In these cases, Jung turned to ongoing symbolic communication from the unconscious in the form of dreams and visions.

Resolution of the tension causing this type of neurosis involves a careful constructive study of the fantasies. The seriousness with which the individual (ego) must take the mythological aspects of the fantasies may compare with the regard that devoted believers have toward their religion. It is not merely an intellectual exercise, but requires the commitment of the whole person and realization that the unconscious has a connection to life-giving spiritual forces. Only a belief founded on direct experience with this process is sufficient to oppose, balance, and otherwise adjust the attitude of the ego.

When this process works, this type of neurosis may be considered a life-guiding gift from the unconscious, even though the personal journey forced upon the individual sometimes takes decades. This may seem absurd to someone looking at a neurosis from the attitude that it is always an illness that should not have to happen, expects the doctor to have a quick cure, and that fantasies are unreliable subjective experiences.

A significant aspect of Jung's theory of neurosis is how symptoms can vary by psychological type. The hierarchy of discriminating psychological functions gives each individual a dominant sensation, intuition, feeling, or thinking function preference with either an extroverted or introverted attitude. The dominant is quite under the control of the ego. But the inferior function remains a gateway for unconscious contents. This creates typical manifestations of inferior insight and behavior when extreme function one-sidedness accompanies the neurosis.

== The attitude of the unconscious ==
Jung's theory of neurosis is based on a psyche that consists of tensions between various opposite attitudes in a self-regulating dynamic. The ego, being the center of consciousness, represents the coalescing attitude of consciousness. The ego's attitude is in tension with a complementary and balancing attitude in the unconscious.

In appropriate circumstances the unconscious attitude can directly oppose the ego's attitude and produce all manner of neuroses. These situations arise when the conscious attitude has been unable to recognize and effectively integrate issues important to the attitude of the unconscious.

"It may perhaps seem odd that I should speak of an 'attitude of the unconscious.' As I have repeatedly indicated, I regard the attitude of the unconscious as compensatory to consciousness. According to this view, the unconscious has as good a claim to an "attitude" as the latter (Jung, [1921] 1971: par. 568)."

== Freud, Alfred Adler, and psychological types ==
Jung started from Freud's and Adler's already developed and competing theories of neurosis. Both claimed universal applicability and rejected the other's. Jung saw both theories as valuable but limited in scope. As such, he used them at appropriate times. His attempt to reconcile his appreciation of each theory compelled Jung to investigate and incorporate psychological types into his theory. Jung considered Freud's "Eros" theory extroverted and Adler's power theory introverted.

"The actual existence of far-reaching type-differences, of which I have described eight groups in [Psychological Types], has enabled me to conceive the two controversial theories of neurosis as manifestations of a type-antagonism. This discovery brought with it the need to rise above the opposition and to create a theory which would do justice not merely to one or the other side, but to both equally (Jung, 1966: pars. 65-66)."

Despite their apparently irreconcilable differences, Jung found his "justice" perspective by identifying a fundamental limitation in common.

"They are critical methods, having, like all criticism, the power to do good when there is something that must be destroyed, dissolved, or reduced, but capable only of harm when there is something to be built (Jung, 1966: par. 65)."

== Positive meaning of neurosis ==
For Jung, a neurosis is not completely negative, despite, and even because of, its debilitating aspects. Interpreted positively, it has fundamental purpose for some people.

"The reader will doubtless ask: What in the world is the value and meaning of a neurosis, this most useless and pestilent curse of humanity? To be neurotic – what good can that do? ... I myself have known more than one person who owed his whole usefulness and reason for existence to a neurosis, which prevented all the worst follies in his life and forced him to a mode of living that developed his valuable potentialities. These might have been stifled had not the neurosis, with iron grip, held him to the place where he belonged (Jung, 1966: par. 68)."

== Collective mythological images ==
Jung distinguished between the personal unconscious and the collective unconscious. To find the positive therapeutic direction as impartially as he could, Jung identified and interpreted dream images generated by the collective unconscious in a constructive way rather than reducing them to personal indications. Since collective themes are common to all humanity, they find their counterpart in mythological motifs.

"[Freud's and Adler's theories] rest on an exclusively causal and reductive procedure which resolves the dream (or fantasy) into its memory components and the underlying instinctual processes. I have indicated above the justification as well as the limitation of this procedure. It breaks down at the point where the dream symbols can no longer be reduced to personal reminiscences or aspirations, that is, when the images of the collective unconscious begin to appear (Jung, 1966: par. 122)."

== Normalcy of the divided psyche ==
Jung considered the divided psyche normal even though it manifests itself pathologically in neurosis and, more especially, in psychosis.

"As a matter of history, it was the study of dreams that first enabled psychologists to investigate the unconscious aspect of conscious psychic events."

"It is on such evidence that psychologists assume the existence of an unconscious psyche – though many scientists and philosophers deny its existence. They argue naively that such an assumption implies the existence of two 'subjects,' or (to put it in a common phrase) two personalities within the same individual. But that is exactly what it does imply – quite correctly. And it is one of the curses of modern man that many people suffer from this divided personality. It is by no means a pathological symptom; it is a normal fact that can be observed at any time and anywhere. It is not merely the neurotic whose right hand does not know what the left is doing. This predicament is a symptom of a general unconsciousness that is the undeniable common inheritance of all mankind (Jung, 1964:23)."

"He hears and does not hear; he sees, yet is blind; he knows and is ignorant (Jung, 1964:33)."

== Collective neuroses in politics ==
Jung saw the divided psyche in the normal individual reflected in the neurotic nature of global politics, and vice versa.

If, for a moment, we regard mankind as one individual, we see that the human race is like a person carried away by unconscious powers; and the human race also likes to keep certain problems tucked away in separate drawers ... Our world is, so to speak, dissociated like a neurotic, with the Iron Curtain making a symbolic line of division. ... It is the face of his own evil shadow that grins at Western man from the other side of the Iron Curtain (Jung, 1964:85).

== See also ==
- Analytical psychology
- Neurosis
