= Thomas William Salmon =

American physician (1876–1927)

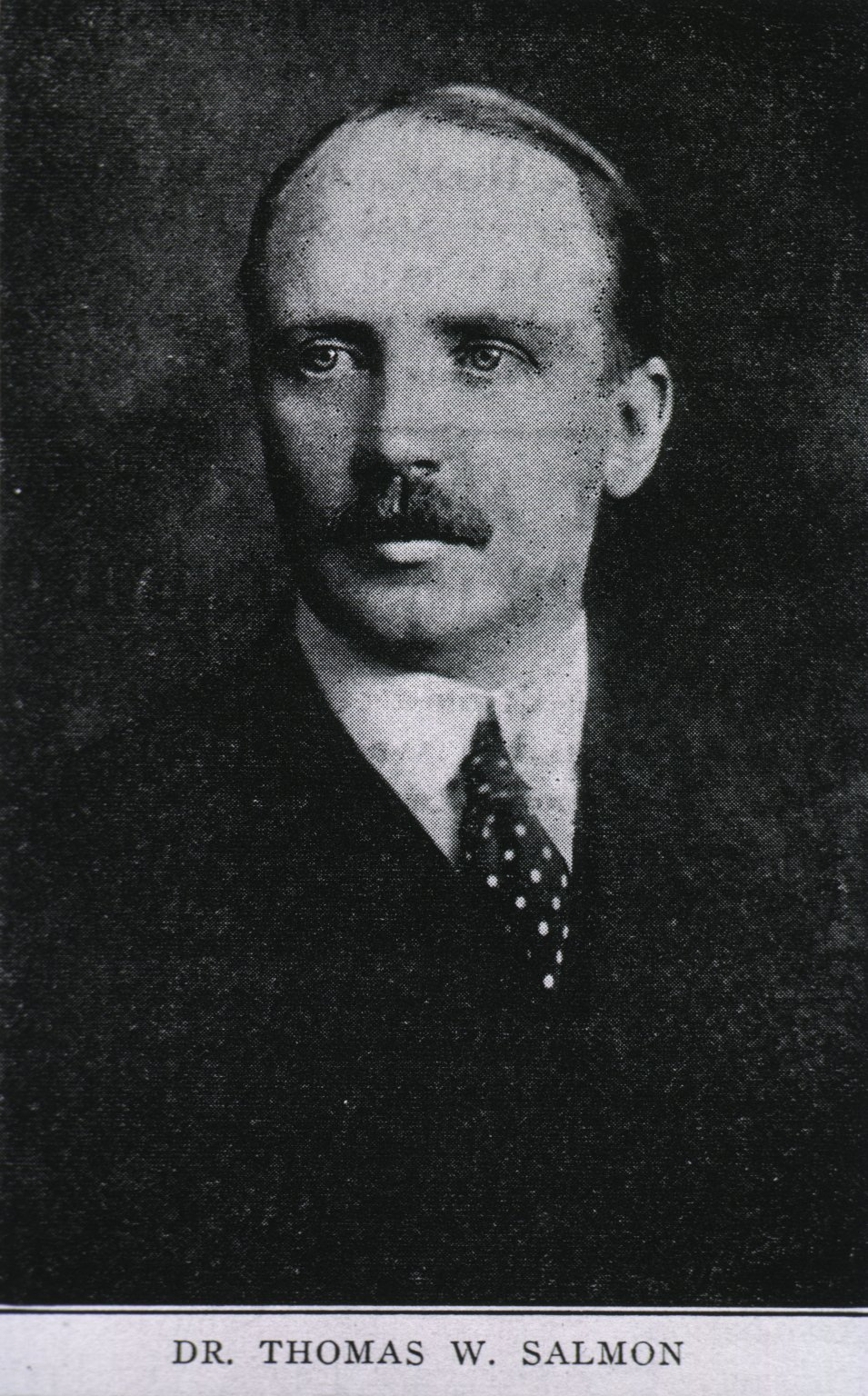
Thomas Salmon

Thomas William Salmon, M.D. (1876–1927) was a leader of the mental hygiene movement in the United States in early twentieth century.

== Formative years and early career ==
Salmon was born in Lansingburg (now Troy, New York), the son of a physician. He entered the Albany Medical College, and received his M.D. in 1899. He began his medical practice in Brewster, New York but left it 1901. He worked at Willard State Hospital to investigate a diphtheria epidemic, which he helped end successfully, and became New York State mental hospital bacteriologist. The two years he spent at Willard gave him entry into the world of psychiatry.

Salmon entered the U.S. Public Health Service (USPHS) in 1903. The following year, he was assigned to the Immigration Station on Ellis Island to examine the immigrants arriving from Europe. At that time, Federal law excluded entry of immigrants with evidence of mental illness, feeble mindedness, epilepsy, or criminal background. Detainees were kept at Ellis Island until arrangements could be made to return to Europe. Salmon was distressed by the poor conditions under which the detainees were kept and pressed his superiors for improvements at Ellis Island. He also urged that those applying for entry into the United States be examined at the port of embarkation to weed out those with excludable conditions. He was unsuccessful and was transferred to a Public Health Service hospital in Chelsea, Massachusetts where he practiced general medicine for four years. He was assigned as medical officer to provide care to fishermen. On his return, he recommended to the Public Health Service that a hospital ship be provided to give medical care to the northeastern fishing communities. He wrote articles and testified before U.S. Congressional committees. His efforts in bypassing his superiors were not met kindly. However, five years later, Congress authorized a hospital ship.

In 1911, the New York State Commission in Lunacy asked the Public Health Service to grant Salmon a leave of absence from the Public Health Service to study the problems of foreign-born patients in state mental hospitals. Salmon organized statistical surveys and helped to devise a uniform system of reporting admissions and discharges.

== Mental hygiene movement ==
During the years of Salmon’s work in the Public Health Service, a new movement was under way. Clifford Beers, a Yale graduate living in Connecticut became mentally ill. He was confined for three years in private and public mental hospitals where he received harsh treatment. Upon his recovery, he was determined to bring better care to mental patients. He wrote and published a book in 1909 titled A Mind that Found Itself which received favorable comments from lay and professional groups. With their help, Beers organized the Connecticut Association for Mental Hygiene and the following year he led the formation of the National Committee for Mental Hygiene. The aims of the organization were to raise standards of care for the mentally ill, to study and disseminate information about the illness, to seek methods of prevention, and to foster the organization of a mental hygiene society in each state. Funds for the new organization came from private philanthropists and foundations.

Salmon joined the National Committee for Mental Hygiene. Beers served as Secretary and Salmon became the Director of Special Surveys and his first task was to obtain information about conditions in state mental hospitals. More than 60 surveys were carried out in state and county hospitals in 35 states and the information was reported to state legislatures, which led to reforms in many states. In 1915, Salmon was given the title of Medical Director of the National Committee for Mental Hygiene and he resigned from the Public Health Service.

== Military service ==
In 1914, the U.S. Surgeon General established the position of Chief of Psychiatry under Dr. Pearce Bailey, an eminent neurologist. Salmon became interested in war psychiatry during World War I and in 1916, with Bailey visited the U.S. troops at the Mexican border and discovered that the rate of psychiatric disorders among soldiers was higher than among the civilian populations. The following year, Salmon went to England to study hospital care for soldiers suffering from “shell shock” which was then considered a war-related neurosis. His visit resulted in a detailed report titled The Care and Treatment of Mental Disorders and war neuroses (Shell Shock) in the British Army and included recommendations for a U.S. program in the event the country went to war. These recommendations included the screening of recruits before induction, the organizing of base hospitals and treatment centers, and the recruitment and training of physicians, nurses, reconstruction aides (occupational therapists) and social workers to care for the patients.

In March, 1918, Colonel Salmon was asked to form a psychiatric base hospital at Camp Crane in Pennsylvania as part of the Army's newly formed neuropsychiatric service. His hospital team was deployed to La Fauche, France in May, 1918, and at the time represented one of the first successful wartime deployments of reconstruction aides, later known as occupational therapists. Based on his successes in France, Salmon became an advocate for use of reconstruction aides in the treatment of soldiers suffering from functional war neuroses.

== Post-war career ==
When the war ended, Salmon became concerned with the plight of returning veterans who suffered from mental disorders. The veterans were first sent to state, county, and private mental hospitals, but their needs were greater than the hospitals could offer. Salmon pushed for the establishment of veteran hospitals around the country. Officials in Washington, DC were not favorable to the proposal but with the aid of the American Legion and other veteran groups, Congress eventually authorized the establishment of the Veterans Administration (VA). The first VA director was Dr. C.R. Forbes who soon ignored the psychiatrists’ recommendations regarding hospital care for veterans.

Beginning in 1920, Salmon worked with Pennsylvania's Commonwealth Fund to help create a juvenile delinquency research program and start clinics that offered services to children with emotional or behavioral problems. Salmon left the National Committee for Mental Hygiene in January 1922 and ended his work for the Commonwealth Fund later that year. He later accepted a professorship of psychiatry at the Columbia University in New York City. Salmon was elected as president of the American Psychiatric Association in 1923; he was the first president who had not been employed as a mental hospital superintendent.

On August 13, 1927, Salmon died in the Long Island Sound while sailing. He was buried in Dorset, Vermont.

== Works ==
- Salmon, Thomas W. (1907). "How do you Treat Delirium Tremens?". The New York Medical Journal: 1026–1030.
- Salmon, Thomas W. (1907). "The Relation of Immigration to the Prevalence of Insanity". American Journal of Insanity: 53–71.
- Salmon, Thomas W. (November 1911). "Insanity and the Immigration Law". New York State Hospitals Bulletin.
- Salmon, Thomas W. (2 November 1912). "The Scientific Treatment of the Insane: A National Problem". The New York Medical Journal.
- Salmon, Thomas W. (June 1914). "A United States Hospital Ship for Deep-sea Fishermen: All Other Fishing Countries Provide against the Inevitable Hazards of this Dangerous Calling, Congress is again asked to act, Public Health Service takes Initiative". Modern Hospital. 2 (6).
- Salmon, Thomas W. (1914). "General Paralysis as a Public Health Problem". Proceedings of the American Medico-Psychological Association: 175–184.
- Salmon, Thomas W. (February 1915). "The Care of the Insane under State Boards of Control". State Hospitals Bulletin. OCLC 226300171.
- Salmon, Thomas W. (1917). The Care and Treatment of Mental Diseases and War Neuroses ("Shell Shock") in the British Army. New York: War Work Committee of the National Committee for Mental Hygiene. OCLC 11539475.
- Salmon, Thomas W. (1917). "The Care and Treatment of Mental Diseases and War Neuroses (Shell Shock) in the British Army". Mental Hygiene. 1 (4): 509–547.
- Salmon, Thomas W. (1917). "Some New Fields in Neurology and Psychiatry". Journal of Nervous & Mental Disease. 46 (2): 90–99. doi:10.1097/00005053-191708000-00002. S2CID 143099763.
- Salmon, Thomas W. (1917). "Feeblemindedness and the Law from a Medical Viewpoint". Medical Times: 33–36.
- Salmon, Thomas W. (1917). "War Neuroses (Shell Shock)". The Military Surgeon: 674–693.
- Salmon, Thomas W. (1918). "Neurology and Psychiatry in the Army". Journal of Nervous & Mental Disease. 47 (3): 212. doi:10.1097/00005053-191803000-00007.
- Salmon, Thomas W. (1919). "Psychiatric Lessons of the War". The New York Medical Journal.
- Salmon, Thomas W. (1919). "War Neuroses and their Lesson". The New York Medical Journal: 993.
- Salmon, Thomas W. (November 1919). "Some New Problems for Psychiatric Research in Delinquency". Journal of the American Institute of Criminal Law and Criminology. 10 (3): 375–384. doi:10.2307/1133818. JSTOR 1133818.
- Salmon, Thomas W. (1922). "Some Problems of Disabled Ex-service Men Three Years after the Armistice". Mental Hygiene: 1–10.
- Salmon, Thomas W. (26 September 1923). Mind and Medicine (Speech). Opening Session of the College of Physicians and Surgeons. Columbia University.
- Salmon, Thomas W. (1924). Mind and Medicine. New York: Columbia University Press. OCLC 574946.
- Salmon, Thomas W.; Fenton, Norman (1929). "In the American Expeditionary Force". Neuropsychiatry. The Medical Departement of the United States Army in the World War. Vol. 10. Washington, DC: U.S. Government Printing Office. OCLC 71434369.
