= Paul Charles Dubois =

Swiss neuropathologist (1848–1918)

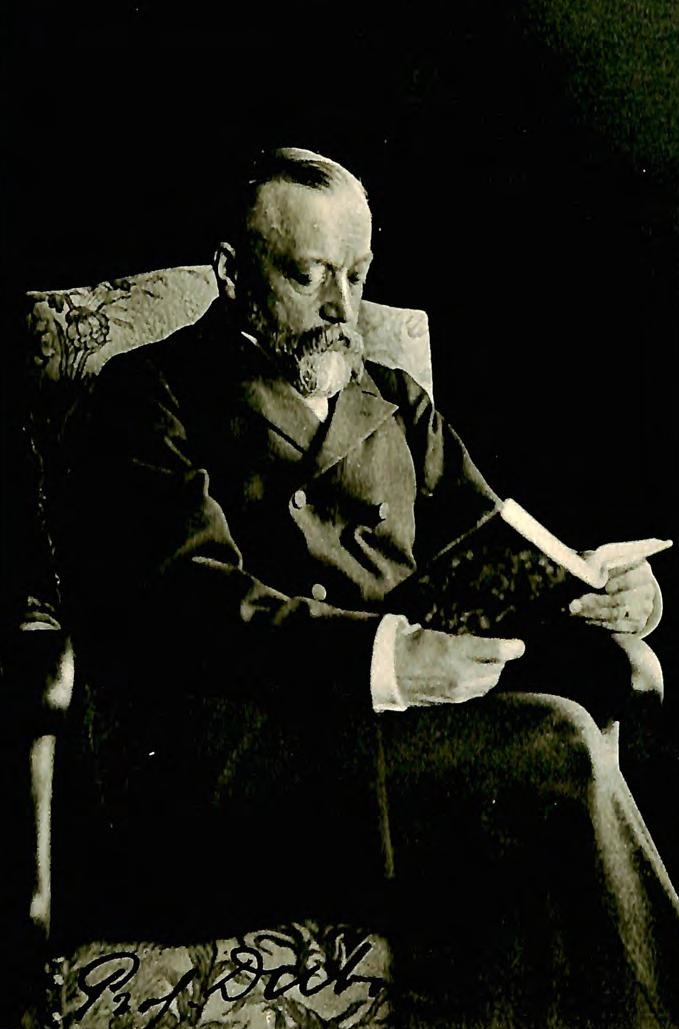
- Born: 28 November 1848
- Died: 4 November 1918 (aged 69)
- Citizenship: Swiss
- Known for: "persuasion therapy"
- Medical career
- Research: neuropathologist

Paul Charles Dubois (French pronunciation: [pɔl ʃaʁl dybwa]; 28 November 1848 – 4 November 1918) was a Swiss neuropathologist who was a native of La Chaux-de-Fonds.

Dubois studied medicine at the University of Bern, and in 1876 was a general practitioner of medicine in Bern. He was interested in psychosomatic medicine, eventually gaining a reputation as a highly regarded psychotherapist. In 1902 he became a professor of neuropathology at Bern. Dubois was influenced by the writings of German psychiatrist Johann Christian August Heinroth (1773–1843).

Dubois is known for the introduction of "persuasion therapy", a process that employed a rational approach for treatment of neurotic disorders. Within this discipline, he developed a psychotherapeutic methodology that was a form of Socratic dialogue, using the doctor-patient relationship as a means to persuade the patient to change his/her behavior. He believed it was necessary to appeal to a patient's intellect and reason in order to eliminate negative and self-destructive habits. He also maintained it was necessary for the physician to convince the patient of the irrationality of their own neurotic feelings and thought processes. Dubois was disdainful of hypnotic therapy.

Dubois has been described as "the first significant modern proponent" of a rational therapy or cognitive therapy, and for some time in the early 20th century it had competed in popularity with Freudian psychoanalysis, especially in the US, but is little known today.

His best known written work was the 1904 Les psychonévroses et leur traitement moral, which was later translated into English as "Psychic Treatment of Nervous Disorders (The Psychoneuroses and Their Moral Treatment)". The preface of this book was written by his friend, neurologist Joseph Jules Dejerine (1849–1917). Another influential publication by Dubois was a "mind over matter" treatise titled De l'influence de l'esprit sur le corps. Dubois was also an editor of Constantin von Monakow's Schweizer Archiv für Neurologie und Psychiatrie (Swiss Archive for Neurology and Psychiatry).
