= Relaxation (psychology) =

Emotional state of low tension and an absence of arousal

Mental state in terms of challenge level and skill level, according to Csikszentmihalyi's flow model. (Click on a fragment of the image to go to the appropriate article)

In psychology, relaxation is the emotional state of low tension, in which there is an absence of arousal, particularly from negative sources such as anger, anxiety, or fear.

Relaxation is a form of mild ecstasy coming from the frontal lobe of the brain in which the backward cortex sends signals to the frontal cortex via a mild sedative. Relaxation can be achieved through meditation, autogenics, breathing exercises, progressive muscle relaxation and other means.

Relaxation helps improve coping with stress. Stress is the leading cause of mental and physical problems, therefore feeling relaxed is often beneficial for a person's health. When a person is highly stressed, the sympathetic nervous system is activated because one is in a fight-or-flight response mode; over time, this could have negative effects on a human body.

== History ==
The idea of relaxation in psychology was popularized by Dr. Edmund Jacobson in his published book Progressive Relaxation (1929). It was a technical book intended for doctors and scientists. His book describes tensing and relaxing specific muscles at a time to achieve overall relaxation in the body. Jacobson then published another book called You Must Relax published in 1934 that was geared towards the general public. According to Jacobson, his research started in 1908 at Harvard University, and later moving on to Cornell and University of Chicago. His research was aimed at improving the general human well-being.

Youth relaxing during May Day. Paul Szinyei Merse: Majális

In 1932, Johannes Schultz and Wolfgang Luthe developed a method of relaxation that emphasized using the power of suggestion, called autogenic training.

In 1975, Herbert Benson and Mirium Z. Klipper published a book called The Relaxation Response, which gives instructions on tying meditation techniques into daily activities the average person could do.

== Techniques ==
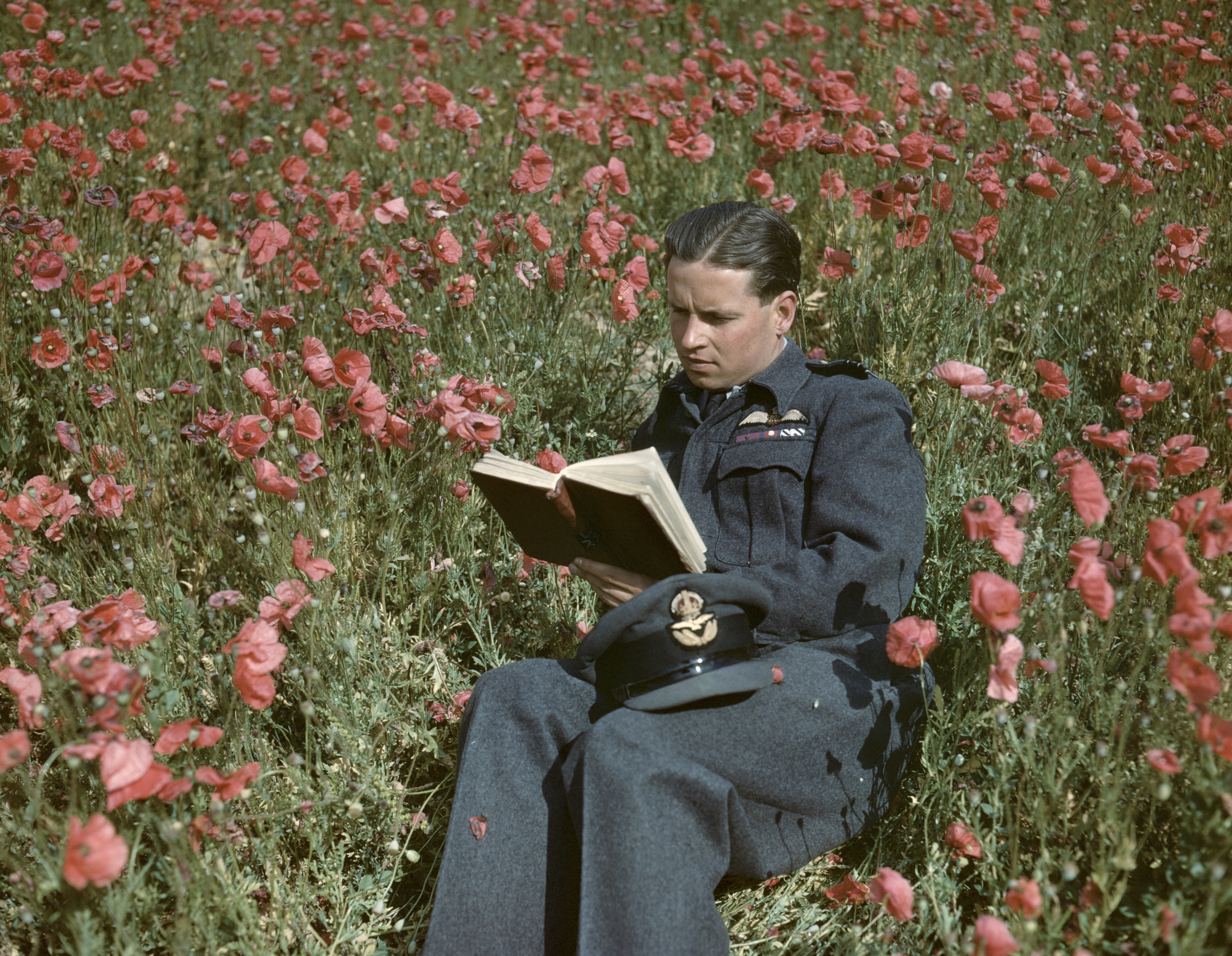
A man relaxing with a book

Although stress levels vary across society, the fact remains that stress can be detrimental to one's health. In order to combat this stress, there have been a variety of methods developed that have been proven to reduce stress and its consequences in everyday life. The majority of techniques can be classified into either physical, mental or therapeutic techniques.

=== Physical ===
Breathing techniques are one of the easiest ways to reduce stress. They require little effort and can be done anywhere at any time. Proper breathing techniques that incorporate deep abdominal breathing have been shown to reduce the physical symptoms of depression, anxiety and hypertension as well as everyday emotional symptoms of anger and nervousness. A study found cyclic sighing to be effective in reducing anxiety, negative mood and stress, and more so than equivalent-duration mindfulness meditation. These 5-min breathwork exercises consist of deep breaths followed by extended, relatively longer exhales.

Progressive muscle relaxation is a technique wherein people focus on flexing and holding a certain set of muscles and then slowly relaxing them and focusing attention on a group of muscles. Gradually, from top to bottom, one might feel a deep sense of relaxation. Progressive muscle relaxation is a somewhat adapted version of the Jacobsonian Relaxation Technique developed in the 1920s. Progressive muscle relaxation is currently used in clinical and non-clinical settings to reduce the effects of anxiety and sleeplessness brought upon by stress.

=== Mental ===
Meditation has long been practiced around the world, but has only become commonplace relatively recently in North America. Studies suggest that in addition to reducing physiological and psychological stresses placed on a body, people who practice meditation have fewer doctor visits for physical or psychological illnesses.

Hypnosis relaxation therapy has recently become another technique used among healthcare professionals to promote relaxation. When performed correctly, it puts a person into a state of deep relaxation and high vulnerability to suggestions made by the hypnotist. In addition to relaxation, hypnosis therapy is used to treat a variety of conditions. Hypnosis is promoted by the Mayo Clinic for conditions such as smoking addiction, pain, obesity, chemotherapy reaction, asthma, and allergies.

Many relaxation techniques, including physical ones, involve sustaining a passive simple focus.

=== Therapeutic ===
Relaxation techniques used in therapy by a certified counselor or therapist could include any of the previous techniques discussed. Professionals in the fields of psychology or counseling can administer a variety of these techniques. If they feel it is appropriate they may prescribe medication to assist the patient with relaxation. Although a number of these techniques are simple and can be performed on one's own time, patients may receive better results if they are guided by a professional who is very familiar with the techniques.

A common example of this guided imagery. Guided imagery includes focusing on a positive mental image or scene. It may also be known as visualization or guided meditation. One could either visualize peaceful or pleasant; it all depends on personal preference. Medical News Today indicates that guided imagery relieves pain, alleviates stress, reduces anxiety, decreases depressive symptoms, and improves sleep quality. This is commonly practiced at hospitals with the guidance needed, but there is also a way to do this at home. Multiple videos or audio are out there to help guide when lacking a guide. For example, the National Health Service (NHS) provides information about guided imagery and links audio with someone guiding the process. Additionally, they recommend doing the exercises anywhere from 15-30 minutes, practicing in an uninterrupted setting, and that for the first two weeks, practice it twice a day until you and your mind master it.

=== Meditation ===
Herbert Benson, a professor at the medical school at Harvard University, has proposed in his book The Relaxation Response a mechanism of the body that counters the fight-or-flight response. The relaxation response reduces the body's metabolism, heart and breathing rate, blood pressure, muscle tension, and calms brain activity. It increases the immune response, helps attention and decision making, and changes gene activities that are the opposite of those associated stress. The relaxation response is achieved through meditation. Benson's meditation technique involves these four steps:

1. A quiet environment to help focus
2. A mental device to help keep attention constant (a sound or word said repeatedly)
3. A positive attitude to avoid getting upset over failed attempts
4. A comfortable position

=== Autogenics ===
Autogenics was invented by Dr. Johannes Heinrich Schultz in the 1920s. The process of autogenics is by relaxing muscles deeply, and by doing so, the mind follows through and relaxes as well. There as six parts to autogenics training:

1. Heaviness in parts of the body (arms and legs feel heavy)
2. Warmth in parts of the body (arms and legs feel warm)
3. Heartbeat (heart is calm)
4. Breathing (breathing is calm)
5. Warmth in the abdominal area
6. Forehead is cool

=== Activities, lifestyle and chemicals ===
Taking walks in nature can be used to induce or support relaxation. Studies indicate taking walks in nature is more effective than walking elsewhere, walking on a treadmill, and viewing nature scenes, and that "spending at least 120 minutes a week in nature" (unspecified frequency of visits/week) is associated "with good health and well-being".

Along with taking walks, Yoga is another technique known for its relaxation benefits. Dr. Nevins of the American Osteopathic Association and the National Library of Medicine state that practicing yoga regularly creates mental clarity and calmness increases body awareness, relieves chronic stress patterns, calms the mind, centers attention, and sharpens concentration. Combining deep breathing, gentle stretching, and mindful movements, yoga activates the body's relaxation response, helping to calm the nervous system. This allows for lowering stress hormones, releasing tensions, and alleviating physical symptoms of stress, such as headaches or back pain. Yoga can also offer mental health benefits by emphasizing mindfulness, which involves being present and focusing on the breath. This practice helps quiet the mind, reduces mental chatter, and promotes inner peace. Dr. Nevins notes that yoga's ability to create mental clarity, calmness, and center attention can make it an effective tool for relieving chronic stress. Whether practiced for a few minutes or a more extended session, yoga helps center the mind, increase focus, and provide a deep sense of relaxation, making it a valuable part of a mental self-care routine.

Much like Yoga, Tai chi and Qigong involve flowing movements coupled with mental focus and breathing changes. Evidence from randomized controlled trials in Science Direct suggests that Tai Chi and Qigong may be effective in reducing depressive symptoms, stress, anxiety, and mood disturbances. Tai Chi's focus on deep, rhythmic breathing promotes relaxation. The practice encourages a meditative state that reduces mental tension and calms the mind. It also helps lower stress hormones, leading to a sense of inner peace and relaxation. Cleveland Clinic references a study by Wiley Online Library stating that after 12 weeks of practicing Tai Chi, it reduced "healthy but stressed" people's anxiety levels. Another benefit of Tai Chi is that it is more accessible because one does not need to be as flexible as one would be in Yoga. Because it is not a strength exercise, they recommend practicing it for 20 minutes daily since the body will not need recovery time.

Listening to music or audio can be useful too, in particular various relaxing audio which may include ambient music or soundscapes.

Various substances are known to reduce cortisol or stress in general or to typically contribute to relaxation, albeit effect sizes may be small and vary. These include the substance l-theanine (also contained in green tea), as well as some other anxiolytics for short-term relaxation. Apigenin (also contained in chamomile and an aromatase inhibitor), lemon balm, and gotu kola are also under investigation. Some of these chemicals appear to act through increasing GABA levels. For some and longer-term, the adaptogens rhodiola rosea (also reduces fatigue and increases antioxidant capacity which may not always be beneficial) and ashwaghanda (can also increase testosterone and increase sleepiness at the time taken) may be useful for relaxation as they appear generally healthy or safe and to be able to reduce stress.

=== Effectiveness measurement ===
Effectiveness or relaxation-related neurobiological effects of techniques may be measurable to science possibly via self-reported (or self-tracked) subjective mental states, heart rate variability, cortisol levels, as well as, possibly less commonly, changes to blood pressure, plasma/urinary norepinephrine, norepinephrine spillover rate, various other hormones, heart rate, dexamethasone suppression test, salivary α-amylase, neuroimmune biomarkers, interleukins and peripheral cytokine expression.

== Benefits ==
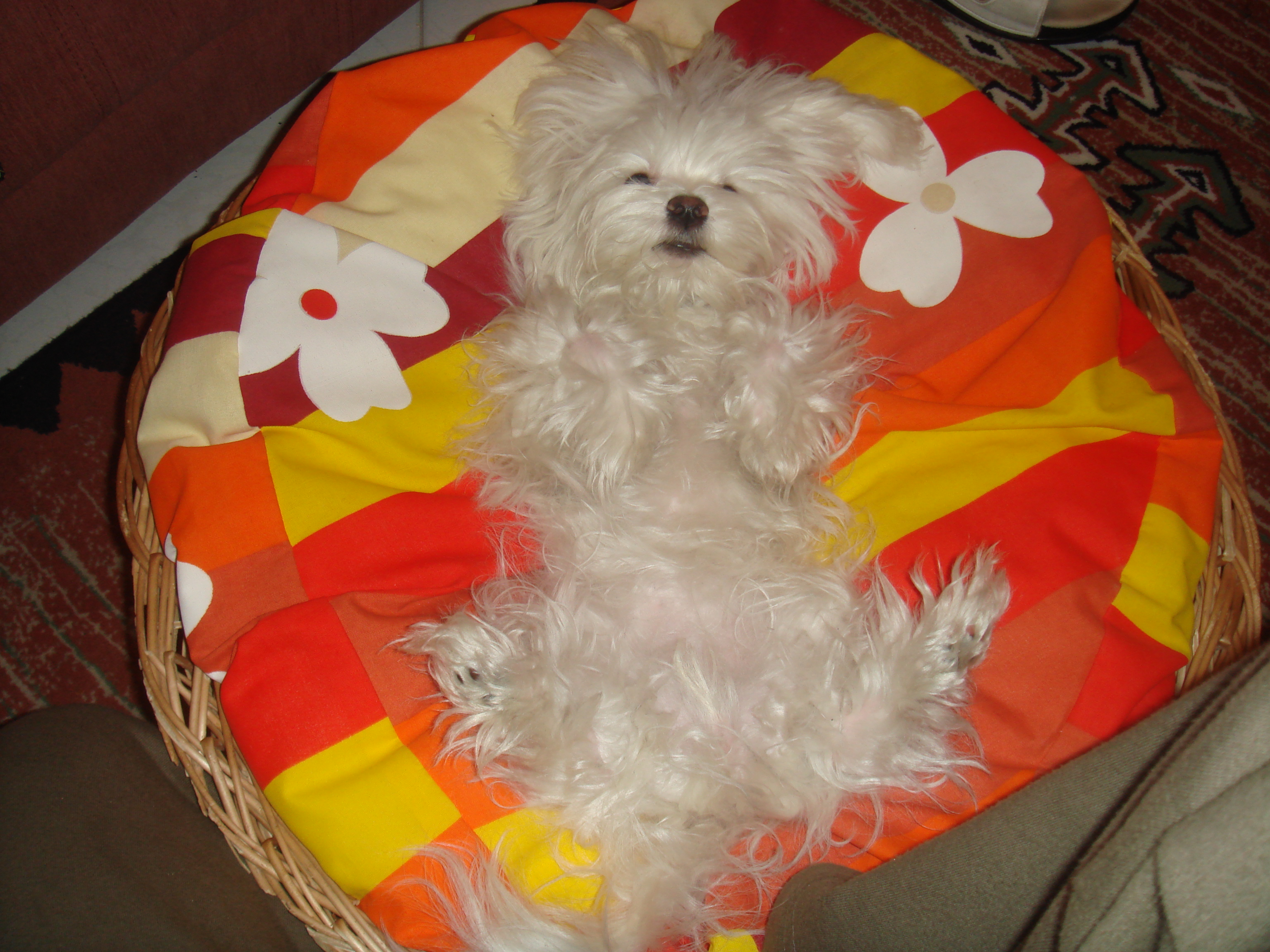
A Maltese dog relaxing

The benefits of relaxation can be found in three main areas of health; mental, physical and physiological. It can elevate mood or induce sleep. All of these things can help prolong and enhance life.

=== Mental ===
Mental health is very important and needs to be worked on every day. Relaxation can help with many impairments that can occur in one's mental health. There is a higher mood and lower anxiety in those who practice relaxation techniques. Those who are relaxed have much slower and clearer thought processes than those who are not relaxed; this can be shown on an EEG. It is well known that relaxation can help reduce stress. With reducing stress, a person can help reduce the negative things that stress can do to the body. Coping mechanisms are also improved with relaxation techniques in both mental and physical pain.

Sleep disorders are an area that can produce stress and mental health issues. Relaxation may help reduce insomnia in those who have sleeping disorders. Those with insomnia may even give up sleeping aids just by practicing relaxation techniques. Avoiding unnecessary medication or sleep aids may help health. Even though relaxation cannot get rid of chronic diseases, it may help dull of the symptoms one may have. Many cancer and AIDS patients are taught relaxation techniques.

=== Physical ===
Physical health is also something that needs to be worked on daily, whether it is exercise, healthy eating, or relaxation. Blood pressure, heart rate, and respiration rate will all decrease when one is relaxed. This means that a person's heart does not beat as fast and their breathing is shallow, helping one's body have time to rest. This will reduce the extra stress that these things can do to the body if they are over worked. Muscle tension will decrease. If one's muscle tension is decreased they are not burning up extra energy that they may need later in the day. Metabolism can also decrease; this is mostly seen in hibernation and sleep and that gives the body extra time to rest and focus on other aspect that it needs to. This could be seen as a good or bad thing, depending on the overall quality of health. People who practice relaxation have said to be able to tolerate pain better both mentally and physically.

=== Physiological ===
In regards to the nervous system, relaxation can also play a big role. A person will go from active and alert, which is the sympathetic, to parasympathetic which is rest and digest. When they are relaxing, it gives the body time to catch up. A person does not need to worry about running, because they are sitting still and allowing "rest and digest". Immune systems will sometimes benefit from increased relaxation which is why relaxation can be seen as part of treatment for AIDS and cancer patients.

== See also ==
- Alertness
- Relaxation technique
- Comfort zone
