= Acute stress reaction =

Response to a terrifying, traumatic or surprising experience

- Other names: Acute stress disorder, psychological shock, mental shock, shock
- Specialty: Psychiatry
- Symptoms: Disturbing thoughts, feelings, or dreams related to the event; dissociation; irritability; increased fight-or-flight response
- Duration: < 1 month
- Causes: Exposure to a traumatic event
- Differential diagnosis: Post-traumatic stress disorder, adjustment disorder

Acute stress reaction (ASR), also known as psychological shock, mental shock, or simply shock, (Note: Not to be confused with circulatory shock.) as well as acute stress disorder (ASD), is a psychological response to a terrifying, traumatic, or surprising experience. The reactions may include but are not limited to intrusive thoughts, dissociation, and reactivity symptoms such as avoidance or hyperarousal. It may be exhibited for days or weeks after the traumatic event. If the condition is not correctly addressed, it may develop into post-traumatic stress disorder (PTSD).

== Diagnosis ==
The International Classification of Diseases (ICD) treats this condition differently from the Diagnostic and Statistical Manual of Mental Disorders (DSM). According to the ICD-11, acute stress reaction refers to the symptoms experienced a few hours to a few days after exposure to a traumatic event. In contrast, DSM-5 defines acute stress disorder by symptoms experienced 48 hours to one month following the event. Symptoms experienced for longer than one month are consistent with a diagnosis of PTSD per both classifications.

=== ICD-11 criteria ===
The ICD-11 MMS gives the following description:

Acute stress reaction refers to the development of transient emotional, somatic, cognitive, or behavioural symptoms as a result of exposure to an event or situation (either short- or long-lasting) of an extremely threatening or horrific nature (e.g., natural or human-made disasters, combat, serious accidents, sexual violence, assault). Symptoms may include autonomic signs of anxiety (e.g., tachycardia, sweating, flushing), being in a daze, confusion, sadness, anxiety, anger, despair, overactivity, inactivity, social withdrawal, or stupor. The response to the stressor is considered to be normal given the severity of the stressor.

Symptoms typically appear within hours to days following the stressful event, and usually begin to subside within a few days after the event or following removal from the threatening situation, when this is possible. In cases where the stressor is ongoing or removal is not possible, symptoms may persist but are usually greatly reduced within approximately 1 month as the person adapts to the changed situation.

Acute Stress Reaction in help-seeking individuals is usually, but not necessarily, accompanied by substantial subjective distress and/or interference with personal functioning.

In children, responses to stressful events can include somatic symptoms (e.g., stomachaches or headaches), disruptive or oppositional behaviour, regression, hyperactivity, tantrums, concentration problems, irritability, withdrawal, excessive daydreaming, increased clinginess, bedwetting, and sleep disturbances. In adolescents, responses can include substance use and various forms of acting out or risk-taking.

=== DSM-5 criteria ===
According to the DSM-5, acute stress disorder requires the exposure to actual or threatened death, serious injury, or sexual violation by either directly experiencing it, witnessing it in person, learning it occurred to a close family or friend, or experiencing repeated exposure to aversive details of a traumatic event. In addition to the initial exposure, individuals may also present with a variety of different symptoms that fall within several clusters including intrusion, negative mood, dissociation, avoidance of distressing memories and emotional arousal. Intrusion symptoms include recurring and distressing dreams, flashbacks, or memories related to the traumatic event and related somatic symptoms. Negative mood refers to one's inability to experience positive emotions such as happiness or satisfaction. Dissociative symptoms include a sense of numbing or detachment from emotional reactions, a sense of physical detachment (depersonalization), decreased awareness of one's surroundings, the perception that one's environment is unreal or dreamlike (derealization), and the inability to recall critical aspects of the traumatic event (dissociative amnesia). Emotional arousal symptoms include sleep disturbances, hypervigilance, difficulties with concentration, more common startle response, and irritability. Symptom presentation must last for at least three consecutive days after trauma exposure to be classified as acute stress disorder. If symptoms persist past one month, the diagnosis of PTSD should be assessed for. The presenting symptoms must also cause significant impairment in multiple domains of one's life to be diagnosed.

Additional diagnoses that may develop from acute stress disorder include depression, anxiety, mood disorders, and substance abuse problems. Untreated acute stress disorder can also lead to the development of post-traumatic stress disorder.

=== Diagnostic assessment ===
Evaluation of patients is done through close examination of emotional response. Using self-report from patients is a large part of diagnosing acute stress disorder, as acute stress is the result of reactions to stressful situations.

== Risk factors ==
Risk factors for developing acute stress disorder include a previously existing mental health diagnosis, avoidant coping mechanisms, and exaggerated appraisals of events. Additional factors also include prior trauma history and heightened emotional reactivity.

== Types ==
=== Sympathetic ===
Sympathetic acute stress disorder is caused by the release of excessive adrenaline and norepinephrine into the nervous system. These hormones may speed up a person's pulse and respiratory rate, dilate pupils, or temporarily mask pain. This type of ASR developed as an evolutionary advantage to help humans survive dangerous situations. The "fight-or-flight response" may allow for temporarily enhanced physical output, even in the face of severe injury. However, other physical illnesses become more difficult to diagnose, as ASR masks the pain and other vital signs that would otherwise be symptomatic.

=== Parasympathetic ===
Parasympathetic acute stress disorder is characterized by feeling faint and nauseated. This response is fairly often triggered by the sight of blood. In this stress response, the body releases acetylcholine. In many ways, this reaction is the opposite of the sympathetic response, in that it slows the heart rate and can cause the patient to either regurgitate or temporarily lose consciousness. The evolutionary value of this is unclear, although it may have allowed for prey to appear dead to avoid being eaten.

== Pathophysiology ==
Stress is characterised by specific physiological responses to adverse or noxious stimuli.

Hans Selye was the first to coin the term "general adaptation syndrome" to suggest that stress-induced physiological responses proceed through the stages of alarm, resistance, and exhaustion.

The sympathetic branch of the autonomic nervous system gives rise to a specific set of physiological responses to physical or psychological stress. The body's response to stress is also termed a "fight or flight" response, and it is characterised by an increase in blood flow to the skeletal muscles, heart, and brain, a rise in heart rate and blood pressure, dilation of pupils, and an increase in the amount of glucose released by the liver.

The onset of an acute stress response is associated with specific physiological actions in the sympathetic nervous system, both directly and indirectly through the release of adrenaline and, to a lesser extent, noradrenaline from the medulla of the adrenal glands. These catecholamine hormones facilitate immediate physical reactions by triggering increases in heart rate and breathing, constricting blood vessels. An abundance of catecholamines at neuroreceptor sites facilitates reliance on spontaneous or intuitive behaviours often related to combat or escape.

Normally, when a person is in a serene, non-stimulated state, the firing of neurons in the locus ceruleus is minimal. A novel stimulus, once perceived, is relayed from the sensory cortex of the brain through the thalamus to the brain stem. That route of signalling increases the rate of noradrenergic activity in the locus ceruleus, and the person becomes more alert and attentive to their environment.

If a stimulus is perceived as a threat, a more intense and prolonged discharge of the locus ceruleus activates the sympathetic division of the autonomic nervous system. The activation of the sympathetic nervous system leads to the release of norepinephrine from nerve endings acting on the heart, blood vessels, respiratory centers, and other sites. The ensuing physiological changes constitute a major part of the acute stress response. The other major player in the acute stress response is the hypothalamic-pituitary-adrenal axis. Stress activates this axis and produces neurobiological changes. These chemical changes increase the chances of survival by bringing the physiological system back to homeostasis.

The autonomic nervous system controls all automatic functions in the body and contains two subsections within it that aid the response to an acute stress reaction. These two subunits are the sympathetic nervous system and the parasympathetic nervous system. The sympathetic response is colloquially known as the "fight-or-flight response," indicated by accelerated pulse and respiration rates, pupil dilation, and a general feeling of anxiety and hyper-awareness. This is caused by the release of epinephrine and norepinephrine from the adrenal glands. The epinephrine and norepinephrine strike the beta receptors of the heart, which feeds the heart's sympathetic nerve fibres to increase the strength of heart muscle contraction; as a result, more blood gets circulated, increasing the heart rate and respiratory rate. The sympathetic nervous system also stimulates the skeletal system and muscular system to pump more blood to those areas to handle the acute stress. Simultaneously, the sympathetic nervous system inhibits the digestive system and the urinary system to optimize blood flow to the heart, lungs, and skeletal muscles. This plays a role in the alarm reaction stage. The parasympathetic response is colloquially known as the "rest and digest" response, indicated by reduced heart and respiration rates, and, more obviously, by a temporary loss of consciousness if the system is fired at a rapid rate. The parasympathetic nervous system stimulates the digestive system and urinary system to send more blood to those systems to increase the process of digestion. To do this, it must inhibit the cardiovascular system and respiratory system to optimise blood flow to the digestive tract, causing low heart and respiratory rates. The parasympathetic nervous system plays no role in acute stress response.

Studies have shown that patients with acute stress disorder have an overactive right amygdala and prefrontal cortex; both structures are involved in the fear-processing pathway.

== Treatment ==
This disorder may resolve itself with time or may develop into a more severe disorder, such as PTSD. However, results of Creamer, O'Donnell, and Pattison's (2004) study of 363 patients suggests that a diagnosis of acute stress disorder had only limited predictive validity for PTSD. Creamer et al. found that re-experiences of the traumatic event and arousal were better predictors of PTSD. Early pharmacotherapy may prevent the development of post-traumatic symptoms. Additionally, early trauma-focused cognitive behavioural therapy (TF-CBT) for those with a diagnosis of acute stress disorder can protect an individual from developing chronic PTSD.

Studies have been conducted to assess the efficacy of counselling and psychotherapy for people with acute stress disorder. Cognitive behavioural therapy, which includes exposure and cognitive restructuring, was found to be effective in preventing PTSD in patients diagnosed with acute stress disorder with clinically significant results at six-month follow-up appointments. A combination of relaxation, cognitive restructuring, imaginal exposure, and in-vivo exposure was superior to supportive counselling. Mindfulness-based stress reduction programmes also appear to be effective for stress management.

The pharmacological approach has made some progress in lessening the effects of acute stress disorder. To relax patients and allow for better sleep, prazosin can be given to patients, which regulates their sympathetic response. Hydrocortisone has shown some success as an early preventative measure following a traumatic event, typically in the treatment of PTSD.

In a context where counseling, psychotherapy, and cognitive behavioral therapy is unlikely to be available, the treatment for acute stress reaction is allowing the patient to lie down, providing reassurance, and removing the stimulus that prompted the reaction. In traditional shock cases, this generally means relieving injury pain or stopping blood loss. In an acute stress reaction, this may mean pulling a rescuer away from the emergency to calm down or blocking the sight of an injured friend from a patient.

== History ==
The term acute stress disorder (ASD) was first used to describe the symptoms of soldiers during World War I and II, and it was therefore also termed combat stress reaction (CSR). Approximately 20% of U.S. troops displayed symptoms of CSR during WWII. It was assumed to be a temporary response of healthy individuals to witnessing or experiencing traumatic events. Symptoms include depression, anxiety, withdrawal, confusion, paranoia, and sympathetic hyperactivity.

The American Psychiatric Association officially included ASD in the DSM-IV in 1994. Before that, symptomatic individuals within the first month of trauma were diagnosed with adjustment disorder.

Initially, being able to describe different ASRs was one of the goals of introducing ASD. Some criticisms surrounding ASD's focal point include issues with ASD recognising other distressing emotional reactions, like depression and shame. Emotional reactions similar to these may then be diagnosed as adjustment disorder under the current system of trying to diagnose ASD.

Since its addition to the DSM-IV, questions about the efficacy and purpose of the ASD diagnosis have been raised. The diagnosis of ASD was criticized as an unnecessary addition to the progress of diagnosing PTSD, as some considered it more akin to a sign of PTSD than an independent issue requiring diagnosis. Also, the terms ASD and ASR have been criticized for not fully covering the range of stress reactions.
