= Edmund Jacobson =

American physician and physiologist (1888–1983)

- Born: April 22, 1888; Chicago, Illinois, US
- Died: January 7, 1983 (aged 94); Chicago, Illinois, US
- Education: Northwestern University; Harvard University; Rush Medical School
- Known for: Progressive Muscle Relaxation

Edmund Jacobson (April 22, 1888 – January 7, 1983) was an American physician in internal medicine and psychiatry and a physiologist. He was the creator of Progressive Muscle Relaxation and of Biofeedback.

== Biography ==
He was born on April 22, 1888, Chicago to Fannie and Morris Jacobson. His father was a realtor in Chicago, who was born in Strasbourg, and his wife Fannie was born in Iowa.

He received a B.S. degree from Northwestern University in 1908 in just two years. Jacobson received M.A. and Ph.D. degrees from Harvard University. He took a postgraduate course at Cornell University in 1911. He returned to Chicago as an assistant in physiology. Here he obtained his M.D. degree from Rush Medical School in 1915.

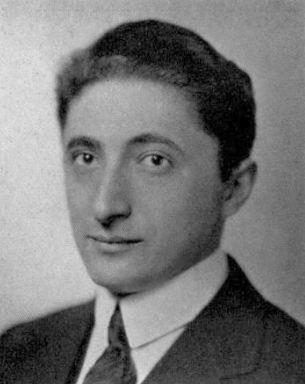
c. 1922

In 1921, he introduced the application of psychological principles to medical practice which was later called psychosomatic medicine. Employing low microvoltage apparatus, Jacobson also made the first accurate electrical measurement of muscular tonus, nerve impulses and mental activities in neuromuscular sites in living men.

Jacobson was able to prove the connection between excessive muscular tension and different disorders of body and psyche. He found out that tension and exertion was always accompanied by a shortening of the muscular fibres, that the reduction of the muscular tonus decreased the activity of the central nervous system, that relaxation was the contrary of states of excitement and well suited for a general remedy and prophylaxis against psychosomatic disorders.

In 1929, after twenty years of research, Jacobson began to publish his results in the book Progressive Relaxation. His major work, You Must Relax, addressing the general public, came out in 1934.

Jacobson deepened his investigations from 1936 through 1960 at the Laboratory for Clinical Physiology in Chicago which he directed, and he continued his investigations of simultaneous chemical and electronic recordings in man in health until the 1970s.

He died on January 7, 1983, at Northwestern University Hospital in Chicago.
