= Progressive muscle relaxation =

Muscle relaxation technique

Progressive muscle relaxation (PMR) is a method of deep muscle relaxation that does not involve any medications, meaning it is a non-pharmacological intervention. The idea behind progressive muscle relaxation is that there is a relationship between a person's mind and body. The body responds to its environment by creating certain mind or body states such as anxiety, stress, and fear. When the body is in these states, the muscles tense up. Progressive muscle relaxation aims to reverse these body states back to more neutral, relaxed states.

The technique is a two-step process. It involves learning to relieve the tension in specific muscle groups by first tensing and then relaxing each muscle group. When the muscle tension is released, attention is directed towards the differences felt during tension and relaxation so that the patient learns to recognize the contrast between the states.

Progressive muscle relaxation is used in many ways. It can influence conditions like anxiety, insomnia, stress, depression, and pain and may have beneficial long term effects. It is also effective for many populations, including both children and adults. People in many different situations can learn to perform progressive muscle relaxation. It is simple to learn and is used in hospital and non-hospital settings.

== History ==
Progressive muscle relaxation was initially developed by American physician Edmund Jacobson. He first presented the technique at Harvard University in 1908. Jacobson continued to work on this topic throughout his life and wrote several books about it.

In 1929, Jacobson published the book Progressive Relaxation, which included a detailed procedure for removing tension in the muscles. Relaxation is the opposite of tension, so his work led to the use of the word "relax" to describe the act of becoming less tense, anxious, or stressed. Jacobson believed that rest and relaxation were different concepts. He explained that people can be tense when they are resting, but they cannot be tense when they are relaxed.

Jacobson designed the progressive muscle relaxation so that it could address a large number of mental and physical conditions. In his 1934 book,You Must Relax: A Practical Method of Reducing the Strains of Modern Living, Jacobson noted the potential applications of his technique. He claimed that progressive muscle relaxation could be beneficial for illness, heart disease, insomnia, and indigestion. However, he believed that only qualified physicians and experts could teach other people the technique. The initial progressive muscle relaxation technique that Jacobson developed required weekly instruction and daily practice.

Eventually, Joseph Wolpe shortened Jacobson's technique to a 20 minute exercise. Wolpe used progressive muscle relaxation to counteract people's fear response. Progressive muscle relaxation developed over many years as other scientists and doctors made changes to the technique. There are many variations of the progressive muscle relaxation technique today.

During the 1970s, medical institutions recognized relaxation techniques such as progressive muscle relaxation as safe and effective alternatives to drug treatments for certain conditions like anxiety, insomnia, and hypertension. The medical world also viewed muscle relaxation as a technique that could effectively promote well-being. However, medical institutions now describe progressive muscle relaxation as a type of complementary medicine since the term "alternative" may imply that the therapy is a replacement for modern medicine. Progressive muscle relaxation can be effectively used with other modern medical treatments or other complementary therapies that promote health.

== The technique today ==
Individuals should perform progressive muscle relaxation in a comfortable place. A person can begin the exercise while sitting or standing. It is important to breathe throughout the entire exercise, because some sources recommend breathing in while tensing the muscles and breathing out as the muscles are released. The exercise should not cause pain or discomfort. Individuals who have injuries should speak with a doctor before performing the exercise. Many individuals choose to visualize the muscles tensing and relaxing as they perform the exercise. Some institutions suggest to slowly tense each muscle group starting with the forehead and ending with the toes. Other exercise instructions recommend starting from the bottom of the body at the feet and working up the body toward the forehead or starting on one side of the body and slowly move through the body to the other side. Sources group muscles differently, but some muscle groups that are commonly used include:

- Forehead
- Eyes/Cheeks
- Mouth/Jaw
- Neck
- Back/Shoulders
- Chest
- Upper Arms
- Hands/Fists
- Abdominal Muscles/Waist
- Hips/Buttocks
- Thighs
- Calves/Feet/Toes

To begin the exercise, the individual slowly breathes in and tenses the first muscle group, then holds the breath and tension for 3–5 seconds. Next, the individual would slowly breathe out while releasing the tension and relax the muscles for 10–15 seconds. The individual can try to visualize how the tension feels like and how it is slowly fading out of their body. Then, the individual breathes in and tenses the next muscle group, repeating this process for all of the muscle groups.

== Applications ==
=== Anxiety ===
PMR is still modernly used to manage anxiety. Anxiety is an emotional reaction to anticipated threats in the environment. PMR can be effective at reducing test anxiety in students. It is also effective at reducing anxiety and improving quality of life in patients with various types of cancer. In addition, heart disease patients and coronavirus patients who feel isolated have also used PMR to help reduce their anxiety. Some studies have found that PMR is effective for both young and old populations, although it is particularly effective at reducing anxiety in older population.

=== Depression ===
PMR is effective at reducing the severity of depression in patients with various conditions like heart disease, coronavirus, and cancer. Some studies have also shown that women can effectively use PMR to manage postpartum depression.

=== Stress ===
Relaxation techniques such as progressive muscle relaxation can alter the body's physical and emotional response to stress by impacting the sympathetic nervous system. The sympathetic nervous system helps the body activate the fight-or-flight response. The sympathetic nervous system is more active when a person is stressed or in danger. PMR impacts this system by reducing cortisol, which is a hormone involved in the stress response of fight-or-flight situations. PMR can also lower blood pressure, metabolism, heart rate, and respiratory rate, which are usually heightened during the stress response.

PMR is effective at relieving different types of stress. Healthcare workers have used PMR to reduce their occupational stress. The technique also improved healthcare workers' physical and mental health since occupational stress can lead to burnout, heart disease, and depression. PMR has the potential to reduce stress very quickly, especially if the stress is related to something that will happen in the near future.

=== Insomnia ===
Non-pharmacological treatment of insomnia has become an alternative replacement or complement to routine medical care. People can use progressive muscle relaxation as a treatment for some cases of insomnia, particularly chronic insomnia. People use PMR to reduce physical tension and interrupt the racing thoughts processes that affect sleep. In general, PMR addresses insomnia by helping people fall asleep more easily, sleep longer, and get a deeper sleep. Cancer patients often experience insomnia due to pain. Some studies reported that the progressive muscle relaxation technique has a beneficial effect on insomnia cancer patients. Coronavirus patients who feel isolated have also used PMR to improve their sleep quality.

=== Pain relief ===
Pain is one of the most frequent symptoms in patients undergoing surgery or cancer chemotherapy and various treatments are proposed for its relief, including complementary relaxation techniques. Overall, PMR is effective at reducing pain in cancer patients, although the biological process behind this relationship is not known.

Progressive muscle relaxation may reduce the perception of pain and provide pain relief that patients experience after undergoing surgery. However, a study on orthopedic surgery patients found that using PMR after an orthopedic surgery did not impact the intensity of pain patients experienced.

Women have used PMR to treat chronic pelvic pain, and the technique has had a positive effect. In many cases, the chronic pain itself was still present, but the perceived threat of pain was eliminated. Chronic pelvic pain is often associated with pain resulting from the functions of the abdominal nervous system (often called "neuropathic pain"). Patients often use PMR to manage their chronic pelvic pain when prescribed medications are unsuccessful. In this case, PMR aims to release tension of the muscles in the abdomen and lower back.

=== Schizophrenia ===
Progressive muscle relaxation has been used in psychiatric settings as an alternative means of coping with subjective stress and states of anxiety. A few modern studies have reported that PMR has a beneficial effect on psychological distress, anxiety, and well-being in patients with schizophrenia.

=== Sports ===
Professional sports athletes experience a lot of physical and mental tension. It has been hypothesized that progressive muscle relaxation techniques may help athletes achieve optimal performance and prevent injury.

== Long term effects ==
According to Encyclopedia of medicine by Miller-Keane, long term effects of practicing progressive muscle relaxation include:

- A decrease in generalized level of anxiety
- A decrease in anticipatory anxiety related to phobias
- Reduction in the frequency and duration of panic attacks
- Improved ability to face phobic situations through graded exposure
- Improved concentration
- An increased sense of control over moods
- Increased self-esteem
- Increased spontaneity and creativity

== See also ==
- Autogenic training – Relaxation technique
- Autosuggestion – Psychological technique related to the placebo effect
- Biofeedback – Gaining awareness of biological processes
- Yoga nidra – State of consciousness between waking and sleeping
