= BCIA =

BCIA may refer to:

- BCIA Inc., a Canadian security firm
- Beijing Capital International Airport
- Beijing Capital International Airport Company Limited, the operator of Beijing Capital International Airport
- Berne Convention Implementation Act of 1988, a U.S. copyright act
- Biofeedback Certification International Alliance
- British Construction Industry Awards
