= Rob Kall =

American inventor

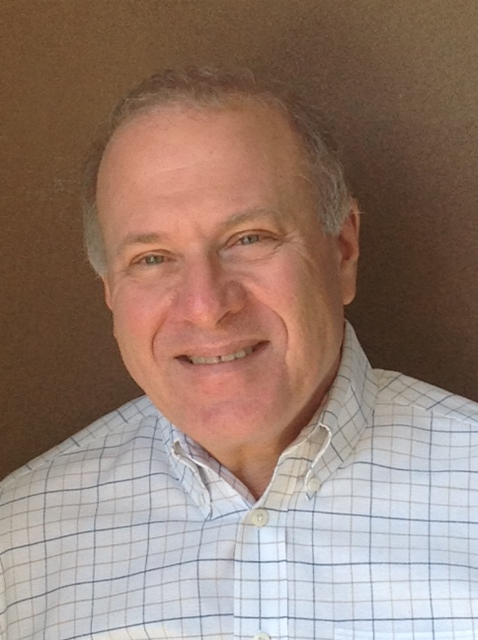
- Born: June 29, 1951 (age 75)
- Education: 1968-1972: Pennsylvania State University: earned B.A. Psychology; 1972-1975: Temple University; La Salle College; St. Joseph's College: Pre-med courses - Organic Chemistry, Biochem, Endocrinology, Physics; 1977-1979, Temple University: earned Master of Education, in Counseling psychology
- Alma mater: Pennsylvania State University; Temple University
- Occupations: chief editor; publisher; columnist; public speaker; campaign consultant; radio host; blogger; inventor
- Employer: self
- Known for: OpEdNews
- Notable work: founder: Futurehealth, Inc; OpEdNews; Storycon.Org
- Website: www.robkall.com

Rob Kall (born June 29, 1951) is an American inventor, journalist, and founder of the OpEdNews website, a United States-based progressive/liberal news, antiwar activism, and opinion website founded in 2003. Kall also hosts the 'Bottom Up Radio Show' as well as being founder and president of 'FutureHealth' and host of 'FutureHeath Radio'. In 2014, Mediaite showed Kall ranked as one of the top 200 print/online columnists.

== Background ==
=== Inventor ===
In 1976-77, while Kall was a graduate student, he learned of the physiological finding that cold hands can result from the vascular constriction that indicates stress. He then developed the "Bio-Q ring" to detect stress through use of 13 liquid crystals to detect changes in the temperature of the hand. The concept was that if a wearer were forewarned of approaching tension, they could mitigate their actions and thus reduce stress. In 1978 and 1979, he took early design samples of the Bio-Q ring to BSA meetings in Albuquerque and San Diego. Encouragement from biofeedback experts Thomas Budzynski, Edward Taub, and others, kept him focused on the concept. Raising money as a freelance medical writer, he founded Futurehealth Inc as a manufacturer of biofeedback instrumentation/materials. By 1984, 185,000 Bio-Q units had been sold, and according to the Futurehealth.org website, by 2014 that quantity has reached over 300,000 units sold in over 50 countries.

=== OpEdNews ===
Rob Kall relates how in early 2003, he had heard a Colin Powell speech about why the United States "had" to go to war with Iraq and felt that Powell's reasons were disingenuous. Wishing to "publish the Truth", Kall began a personal blog which developed into OpEdNews.

"OEN is a publication for the people. In the evolution of it I listened to the readers, writers, and editors. The more I listened to these people, the better the site did. Hardly anything is assigned – it's just people writing about what they want out there, and expressing what they care about. Oped News is written by regular people. Watchdog organizations, whistle-blowers, and people interested in social responsibility like us because we're inclined to publish them. One of the main purposes of Oped News is to give the people who know the real truth an opportunity to be heard. We get between 1000 and 2000 articles submitted each month." - [sic] Rob Kall

Kall's articles on the OpEdNews website have been cross-posted in The Huffington Post. He has been mentioned in an op ed in The New York Times, by Judith Warner.

== Recognition ==
Kall is ranked by Mediaite as one of the top 200 online/print columnists.

=== Awards and nominations ===
In July 2013, Kall, along with his Opednews (new media), became the first media winners of the Pillar Human Rights Award for International Persons of Conscience for supporting whistleblowers and the first amendment, awarded by the 2013 Whistleblower Summit for Civil & Human Rights as hosted by ACORN 8 and Federally Employed Women-Legal Education Fund (FEW/LEF).
