= Journey to Wild Divine =

Biofeedback video game

Journey to Wild Divine is a biofeedback video game system promoting stress management and overall wellness through the use of breathing, meditation and relaxation exercises. The graphics and interface resemble Myst. The designers refer to the product as "biofeedback software", considering it an entertaining training tool for mind and body health, rather than a "game".

== Company history ==
The Journey to Wild Divine is published by Wild Divine, founded in 2001 by Kurt R. Smith and Corwin Bell. Smith is a research scientist specializing in biomedical engineering. A serial entrepreneur, Smith started six medical device startup companies, two of which are now owned by Medtronic. After his tenure with Medtronic, Smith began to pursue a passion "to provide integrative healing tools and services to people in an effective way".

Corwin Bell, a game designer, was studying at Evergreen State College in Olympia, Washington when he realized that computer animation was a format that he could use to manifest his ideas and images. After receiving a master's degree in Communications, Bell moved on to work in the movie industry where he did set design and cinematography. Bell turned to working on children’s software, including The Pagemaster for Turner Interactive and Super Safe Kids, a CD tool that teaches awareness of abduction issues in an animated environment. He also became an instructor at the Art Institute of Colorado.

Smith and Bell met and began exchanging ideas while rock climbing in Eldorado Canyon, Colorado when Bell told Smith about an idea he had to combine a computer game with biofeedback in order to help people. They proceeded with this entertainment-based model intended to benefit people by providing both preventive and integrative care.

Other experts who assisted in the development of Journey to Wild Divine’s products include Jean Houston, a pioneer researcher in human development and extending human capacities, and Nawang Khechog, a former Buddhist monk, who’s studied with the Dalai Lama and is one of Tibet’s foremost world music composers and musicians. Ocean Summer was one of the composers. From the start, Liana Mattulich, a biofeedback expert in Denver, Colorado helped the project see completion. Other experts consulted on the project were Bob Whitehouse and Sunny Turner.

== Products ==
The first program in the series, The Journey To Wild Divine: The Passage, comes with a USB-based biofeedback reader. The device attaches to three fingers and measures heart rate variability and skin conductance level. Heart rate variability measures the amount of variability between heartbeats, which has been reported to be associated with various pathologic conditions. Skin conductance level indicates the amount of perspiration on the skin surface, which is a measure of stress in the body.

In The Journey To Wild Divine: The Passage, users navigate through a series of adventures in a video-game type interface.

The user must adjust these levels in their body to move through the game. The purpose is to develop meditation skills and to gain greater control of unconscious bodily processes by observing and reacting to the changes in the game's various activities, which reflect the body's current state.

The second title in this series is The Journey To Wild Divine: Wisdom Quest. Wisdom Quest also utilizes the same proprietary Iom biofeedback hardware. It retains the same game format while building on the adventure game format.

The third title, Healing Rhythms, is a 15-step program of deep breathing and meditation, along with the Iom biofeedback hardware. In this program experts in the field of health and wellness including medical doctors Andrew Weil, Deepak Chopra, and Dean Ornish guide the user through 15 separate lessons designed to teach stress management in an easy-to-use format with no navigation required.

Current research suggests that stress management can be beneficial to individuals with a variety of physical and mental ailments including high blood pressure and Raynaud's disease, according to the Association for Applied Psychophysiology and Biofeedback. Research by EEG Info Research has shown it to be effective for helping individuals with ADD/ADHD, PTSD, autism and chronic pain.

== Alternatives ==
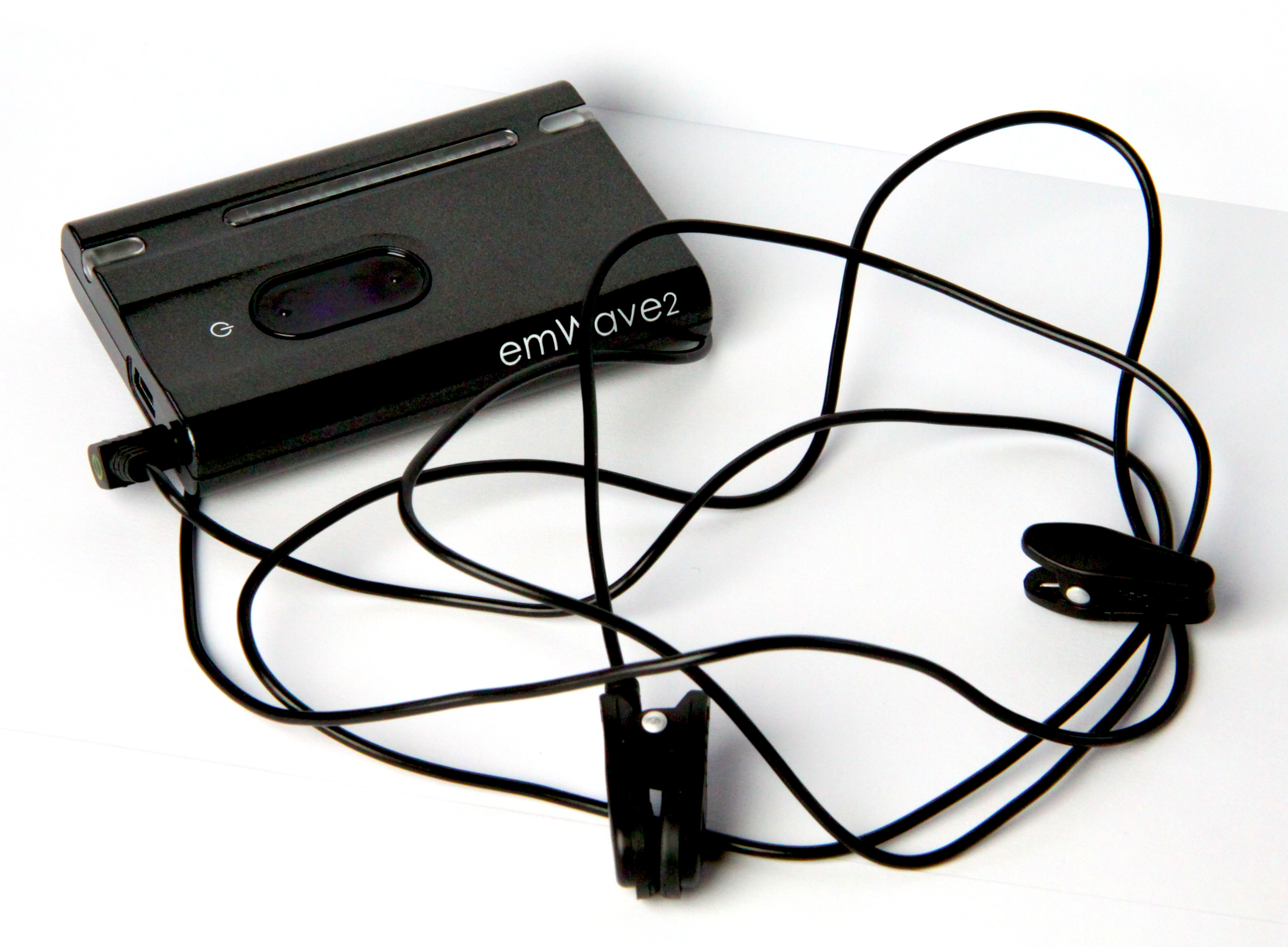
emWave2 with optional ear sensor attached

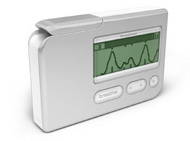
StressEraser

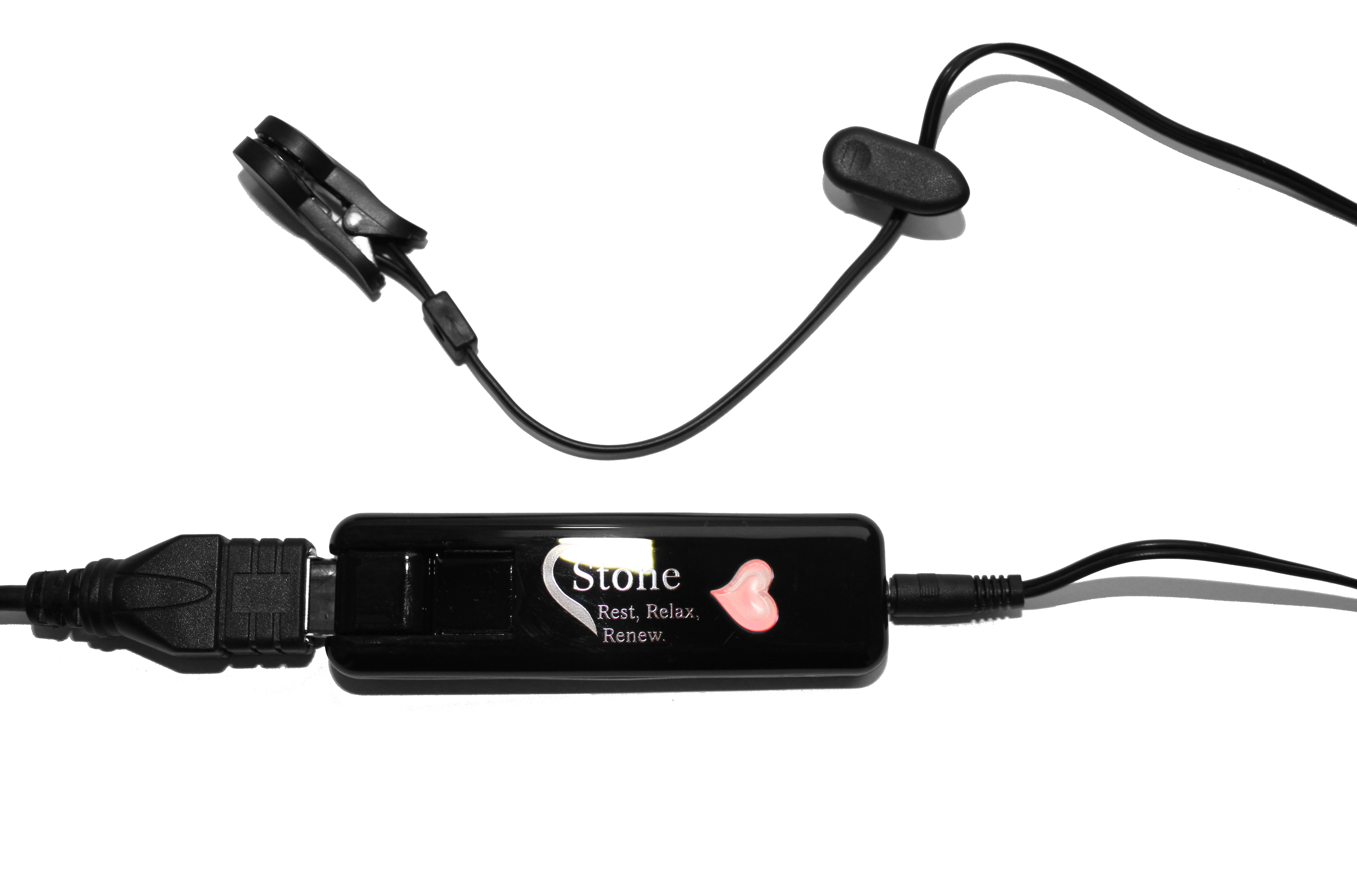
Computer based Stone

Several companies make other in-home, biofeedback stress management devices. These include: emWave (previous name: Freeze-Framer), Stone Biofeedback a computer based software with finger/ear sensor. The pocket-portable version emWave PSR and StressEraser with finger/ear sensor, LED display and sounds. Resperate which is a portable device regulated by the U.S. Food and Drug Administration (FDA) designed to lower blood pressure.

Other non-biofeedback alternatives used in stress-reduction include meditation, deep breathing, and yoga.
