= Barbara Brown (scientist) =

American psychologist

Barbara B. Brown (1921–1999) was a research psychologist who popularized biofeedback and neurofeedback in the 1970s. Biofeedback Magazine, a publication of the Association for Applied Psychophysiology and Biofeedback (AAPB), noted that she was "among the first and most successful to make the public aware of the power and potential of biofeedback."

Brown earned her Ph.D. in Pharmacology from the University of Cincinnati College of Medicine in 1950. She went from a technician at the William S. Merrell division of pharmaceutical company Richardson-Merrell to heading Merell's Department of Pharmacology. From there, she went to Riker Laboratories, then to Psychopharmacology Research Laboratories. Brown later became an Associate Clinical Professor of Pharmacology at the University of California, Los Angeles Center for Health Sciences and at the University of California, Irvine. She also lectured in the Department of Psychiatry at University of California, Los Angeles.

Brown created and popularized the word "biofeedback." She conducted her ground-breaking research when she was Chief of Experiential Physiology Research at the Veterans Administration Hospital in Sepulveda, California.

Brown was co-founder and the first president (1969-1970) of the Biofeedback Research Society, which evolved into the Biofeedback Society of America and then into AAPB. From within that organization, Brown and her colleagues helped to advance and legitimize the study of biofeedback and neurofeedback.

During the 1990s, Brown suffered a stroke; she died in 1999 at the age of 78, after living for several years after the stroke in a nursing home in Rancho Mirage, CA.

== Popular culture ==
Brown was featured in a 1960 episode of the television series One Step Beyond. The episode, titled "The Sacred Mushroom," was a rare, documentary-style departure for the series and dealt with the search for psychedelic mushrooms in Mexico.

== Bibliography ==
- New Mind, New Body: Bio Feedback: New Directions for the Mind, Harper & Row, 1974, hardcover ISBN 0-06-010549-6
- The Biofeedback Syllabus: A Handbook for the Psychophysiologic Study of Biofeedback, Charles C. Thomas Publisher Ltd., Feb. 1975, hardcover, ISBN 0-398-03268-8
- Stress and the Art of Biofeedback, Harper & Row, Jan. 1977. ISBN 978-0-06-010544-0
- Between Health and Illness: New Notions on Stress and the Nature of Well Being, Houghton Mifflin, 1984, hardcover ISBN 0-395-34634-7
- Supermind: The Ultimate Energy, Bantam paperback 1983, ISBN 0-553-14146-5
- Infinite Well-Being, Irvington Publishers, 1985, hardcover ISBN 0-8290-1158-7
- "Biofeedback and Consciousness Commemorative Edition Audio Tape," recording of an invited address to the sixth annual meeting of the AAPB (then known as the BRS).
