= Trance =

Abnormal state of wakefulness or altered state of consciousness

Dissociative trance
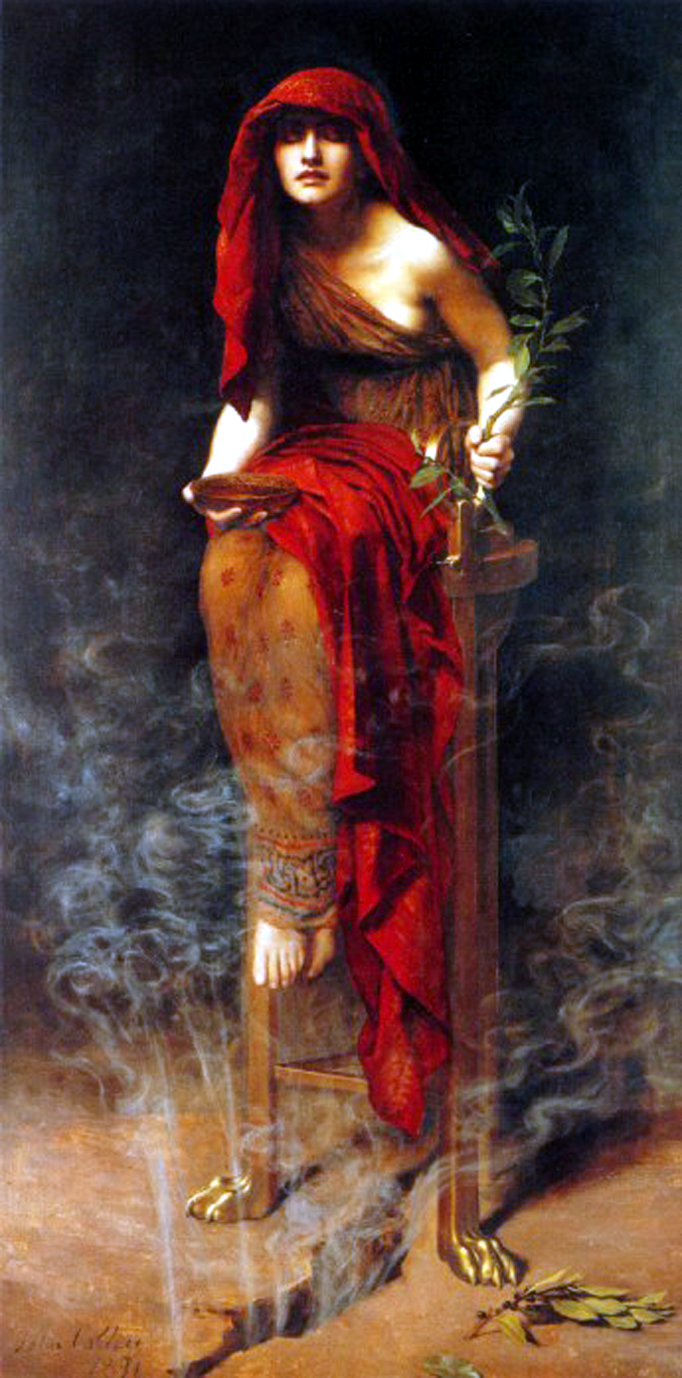
- The Oracle at Delphi was famous for her divinatory trances throughout the ancient Mediterranean world. Oil painting, John Collier, 1891
- Specialty: Psychiatry

Trance is a state of semi-consciousness in which a person is not self-aware and is either altogether unresponsive to external stimuli (but nevertheless capable of pursuing and realizing an aim) or is selectively responsive in following the directions of the person (if any) who has induced the trance. Trance states may occur involuntarily and unbidden.

The term trance may be associated with hypnosis, spirit possession, magic, flow, prayer, psychedelic drugs, and altered states of consciousness.

== Etymology ==
Trance in its modern meaning comes from an earlier meaning of "a dazed, half-conscious or insensible condition or state of fear", via the Old French transe "fear of evil", from the Latin transīre "to cross", "pass over".

== Working models ==
Dennis Wier, in his 1995 book, Trance: from magic to technology, defines a simple trance (p. 58) as a state of mind being caused by cognitive loops where a cognitive object (a thought, an image, a sound, an intentional action) repeats long enough to result in various sets of disabled cognitive functions. Wier represents all trances (which include sleep and watching television) as taking place on a dissociated trance plane where at least some cognitive functions such as volition are disabled; as is seen in what is typically termed a 'hypnotic trance'. With this definition, meditation, hypnosis, addictions and charisma are seen as being trance states. In Wier's 2007 book, The Way of Trance, he elaborates on these forms, adds ecstasy as an additional form and discusses the ethical implications of his model, including magic and government use which he terms "trance abuse".

John Horgan in Rational Mysticism (2003) explores the neurological mechanisms and psychological implications of trances and other mystical manifestations. Horgan incorporates literature and case-studies from a number of disciplines in this work: chemistry, physics, psychology, radiology, and theology.

== Trance states ==
Trance conditions include all the different states of mind, emotions, moods, and daydreams that human beings experience. All activities which engage a human involve the filtering of information coming into sense modalities, and this influences brain functioning and consciousness. Therefore, trance may be understood as a way for the mind to change the way it filters information in order to provide more efficient use of the mind's resources.

Trance states may also be accessed or induced by various modalities and are considered by some people to be a way of accessing the unconscious mind for the purposes of relaxation, healing, intuition, and inspiration. There is an extensive documented history of trance as evidenced by the case-studies of anthropologists and ethnologists and associated and derivative disciplines. Principles of trance are being explored and documented as are methods of trance induction. Mind functioning during trance and benefits of trance states are being explored by medical and scientific inquiry. Many traditions and rituals employ trance. Trance also has a function in religion and mystical experience.

Castillo (1995) states that: "Trance phenomena result from the behavior of intense focusing of attention, which is the key psychological mechanism of trance induction. Adaptive responses, including institutionalized forms of trance, are 'tuned' into neural networks in the brain and depend to a large extent on the characteristics of culture. Culture-specific organizations exist in the structure of individual neurons and in the organizational formation of neural networks."

Hoffman (1998: p. 9) states that: "Trance is still conventionally defined as a state of reduced consciousness, or a somnolent state. However, the more recent anthropological definition, linking it to 'altered states of consciousness' (Charles Tart), is becoming increasingly accepted."

Hoffman (1998, p. 9) asserts that: "...the trance state should be discussed in the plural, because there is more than one altered state of consciousness significantly different from everyday consciousness."

== History ==
=== Mystics ===
As the mystical experience of mystics generally entails direct connection, communication and communion with the divine; trance and cognate experience are endemic. (see Yoga, Sufism, Shaman, Umbanda, Crazy Horse, etc.)

As shown by Jonathan Garb and Stesley, trance techniques also played a role in Lurianic Kabbalah, the mystical life of the circle of Moshe Hayyim Luzzatto and Hasidism.

=== Military ===
Joseph Jordania proposed the term "battle trance" in 2011 for a mental state when combatants do not feel fear and pain, and they lose their individual identity and acquire a collective identity.

=== Christian mystics ===
Many Christian mystics are documented as having experiences that may be considered as cognate with trance, such as: Hildegard of Bingen, John of the Cross, Meister Eckhart, Saint Theresa (as seen in the Bernini sculpture), and Francis of Assisi.

=== Mesmer and the origin of hypnotherapy ===
- Mesmer, an influential but discredited promoter of trance states and their curative powers.
- Milton Erickson, the founder of hypnotherapy who introduced trance and hypnosis to orthodox medicine and psychotherapy—hypnosis here is something different from traditional clinical hypnosis.

=== Trance in American Christianity ===
Taves (1999) charts the synonymic language of trance in the American Christian traditions: power or presence or indwelling of God, or Christ, or the Spirit, or spirits. Typical expressions include "the indwelling of the Spirit" (Jonathan Edwards), "the witness of the Spirit" (John Wesley), "the power of God" (early American Methodists), being "filled with the Spirit of the Lord" (early Adventists; see charismatic Adventism), "communing with spirits" (Spiritualists), "the Christ within" (New Thought), "streams of holy fire and power" (Methodist holiness), "a religion of the Spirit and Power" (the Emmanuel Movement), and "the baptism of the Holy Spirit" (early Pentecostals). (Taves, 1999: 3)

=== Trance and Anglo-American Protestants ===
Taves (1999) well-referenced book on trance charts the experience of Anglo-American Protestants and those who left the Protestant movement beginning with the transatlantic awakening in the early 18th century and ending with the rise of the psychology of religion and the birth of Pentecostalism in the early 20th century. This book focuses on a class of seemingly involuntary acts alternately explained in religious and secular terminology. These involuntary experiences include uncontrolled bodily movements (fits, bodily exercises, falling as dead, catalepsy, convulsions, shaking); spontaneous vocalizations (crying out, shouting, speaking in tongues); unusual sensory experiences (trances, visions, voices, clairvoyance, out-of-body experiences); and alterations of consciousness and/or memory (dreams, somnium, somnambulism, mesmeric trance, mediumistic trance, hypnosis, possession, alternating personality) (Taves, 1999: 3).

== Trance induction and sensory modality ==
Trance-like states are often interpreted as religious ecstasy or visions and can be deliberately induced using a variety of techniques, including prayer, religious rituals, meditation, pranayama (breathwork or breathing exercises), physical exercise, sexual intercourse, music, dancing, sweating (e.g. sweat lodge), fasting, thirsting, and the consumption of psychotropic drugs such as cannabis. Sensory modality is the channel or conduit for the induction of the trance. Sometimes an ecstatic experience takes place in occasion of contact with something or somebody perceived as extremely beautiful or holy. It may also happen without any known reason. The particular technique that an individual uses to induce ecstasy is usually one that is associated with that individual's particular religious and cultural traditions. As a result, an ecstatic experience is usually interpreted within the context of a particular individual's religious and cultural traditions. These interpretations often include statements about contact with supernatural or spiritual beings, about receiving new information as a revelation, also religion-related explanations of subsequent change of values, attitudes, and behavior (e.g. in case of religious conversion).

Benevolent, neutral and malevolent trances may be induced (intentionally, spontaneously and/or accidentally) by different methods:

- Auditory: driving through the sense of hearing by chanting, auditory story telling, mantra, overtone singing, drumming, music, etc.;
- Disciplines: Yoga, Sufism, Surat Shabd Yoga; meditation;
- Gustatory: driving through the sense of taste and indigestion; including: starvation, herbs, hallucinogens, and drugs. As the intake of food and beverage entails intra-bodily chemical reactions through digestion, some infer that all food may be considered medicine or drugs and therefore contribute to the induction of discernible psycho-physical states (see Ancient Medicine). Trance states can be attained through the ingestion of psychoactive drugs, particularly psychedelics, such as cannabis, ketamine, LSD, peyote, psilocybin mushrooms, DMT, and MDMA;
- Kinesthetic: driving through the sense of feeling and movement through the kinesphere by ecstatic dance, story telling by movement, mudra, embodying rituals, yoga, breathwork, oxygen deprivation, sexual stimulation etc.;
- Miscellaneously: traumatic accident, sleep deprivation, nitrogen narcosis (deep diving), fever, by the use of a sensory deprivation tank or mind-control techniques, hypnosis, meditation, prayer;
- Naturally occurring: dreams, lucid dreams, euphoria, ecstasy, psychosis as well as purported premonitions, out-of-body experiences, and channeling;
- Olfactory: driving via scent through the sense of smell by perfume, pheromones, incense, flowers, pollen, indeed any scent for which we have an association or memory, etc.;
- Photic or Visual: driving through the sense of sight by yantra, visual story telling, mandala, cinema, theater, art, architecture, beauty, strobe lights, form constants, symmetry.

=== Auditory driving and auditory art ===
Charles Tart provides a useful working definition of auditory driving. It is the induction of trance through the sense of hearing. Auditory driving works through a process known as entrainment.

The usage of repetitive rhythms to induce trance states is an ancient phenomenon. Throughout the world, shamanistic practitioners have been employing this method for millennia. Anthropologists and other researchers have documented the similarity of shamanistic auditory driving rituals among different cultures.

Andrew Neher (1962) wrote about the importance of drumming in trance in A Physiological Explanation of Unusual Behavior in Ceremonies Involving Drums. Neher wrote that "there has been little investigation in the unusual behavior observed in ceremonies in different parts of the world, which involve drums. This behavior is often described as a trance state in which the individual experiences unusual perceptions or hallucinations. In the extreme case, twitching of the body and a generalized convulsion are reported. These physiological and psychological states, and the importance of the use of drums have remained a mystery."

Neher's (1962) article which is considered by modern scholars who study trance to have made very important connections between trance and drumming. Melinda Maxfield (1994), who received a PhD in Transpersonal Psychology from the Institute of Transpersonal Psychology in Menlo Park, is quoted as saying “It was not until the pioneering work of Andrew Neher (1961, 1962) that the acoustic stimulation in connection with the drum was tested.”

Theta brainwaves are referred to by Neher (1962, 154) as “theta rhythms” which are theta brainwaves in the context of music and drumming. Neher found that individual differences in basic brain wave frequency is between 8 and 13 cycles per second during drum rhythm. The importance of theta brainwaves was proved by later studies done by Maxfield (1994) and Mateusz Konopacki (2018). The difference between alpha, beta, theta, and delta waves is the range of hertz that each falls between. Alpha and theta brainwaves are most associated with drumming and tested by Maxfield (1994) and Konopacki (2018). Both of them found that theta brainwaves are increased with drumming while alpha brainwaves decrease during drumming.

Maxfield's (1994) article The journey of the drum discusses the use of drumming and acoustic stimulation. The auditory tracts pass directly into the reticular activating system (RAS) of the brain stem. The RAS is a massive "nerve net" and functions to coordinate sensory input and motor tone and to alert the cortex to incoming information. The sound traveling on these pathways is capable of activating an entire brain. Maxfield (1994) proposes that “strong, repetitive neuronal firing in the auditory pathways and ultimately in the cerebral cortex, such as would be experienced from drums, could theoretically compete successfully for cognitive awareness. Other sensory stimuli from ordinary reality, including pain, could thus be gated or filtered out. The mind would then be free to expand into other realms.”

Maxfield (1994) conducted an experiment with 12 participants to test the use of drumming in indigenous communities and how trance is achieved through drumming. The most common experiences for the participants included:

- Loss of time sense--Seven of the twelve participants stated that they had lost the time continuum, thus having no clear sense of the length of the drumming session.
- Movement sensations--This category includes the experience of feeling:
  - the body or parts of the body pulsating or expanding
  - pressure on the body or parts of the body, especially the head, throat, and chest
  - energy moving in waves through the body
  - sensations of flying, spiraling, dancing, running, et cetera

The experiences from the 12 participants align with the experiences of the trance state. Maxfield's (1994) experiment proved to show that drumming can and will induce a trance-like state. This proves Neher (1962) was correct to assume that trance can and has been induced from drumming. However, the use of drumming by shamans to achieve a trance state could have been impacted by other factors such as body position, substance use, and chanting. All of these factors could change the trance by either enhancing the trance or creating a different experience than by just drumming.

Maxfield (1994) said that most indigenous cultures do not separate psychological from spiritual processes. Maxfield (1994) quotes Tart (1972, 21) "many primitive peoples . . . believe that almost every normal adult has the ability to go into a trance state and be possessed by a god; the adult who cannot do this is a psychological cripple." Maxfield builds upon both Tart and Neher to prove that drumming induced trance is not just an ancient practice but a modern one that can be found in small communities around the world.

Drumming can induce a trance state; however, the intensity of the trance can vary with some people experiencing a mix of temporal and spatial changes such as loss of time or movement. The difference in trance experience from drumming can be traced to the conditions of the environment of the trance. The environment is key to achieving a trance state as noted by Maxfield (1994) and Konopacki (2018) as they control the environment where the participants are entering a trance state. A controlled environment either by the one drumming or the shaman who is drumming allows for the trance to occur, rather than an environment where the drummer is dependent on outside factors for the trance state. The alpha brainwaves are not activated as much as the theta brainwaves which allows for the trance state to be achieved. The use of drumming induced trance is commonly found in small indigenous communities.

Said simply, entrainment is the synchronization of different rhythmic cycles. Breathing and heart rate have been shown to be affected by auditory stimulus, along with brainwave activity. The ability of rhythmic sound to affect human brainwave activity, especially theta brainwaves, is the essence of auditory driving, and is the cause of the altered states of consciousness that it can induce.

=== Visual driving and visual art ===
Nowack and Feltman published an article entitled "Eliciting the Photic Driving Response" which states that the EEG photic driving response is a sensitive neurophysiological measure which has been employed to assess chemical and drug effects, forms of epilepsy, neurological status of Alzheimer's patients, and physiological arousal. Photic driving also impacts upon the psychological climate of a person by producing increased visual imagery and decreased physiological and subjective arousal. In this research by Nowack and Feltman, all participants reported increased visual imagery during photic driving, as measured by their responses to an imagery questionnaire.

Dennis Wier states that over two millennia ago Ptolemy and Apuleius found that differing rates of flickering lights affected states of awareness and sometimes induced epilepsy. Wier also asserts that it was discovered in the late 1920s that when light was shined on closed eyelids it resulted in an echoing production of brainwave frequencies. Wier also opined that in 1965 Grey employed a stroboscope to project rhythmic light flashes into the eyes at a rate of 10–25 Hz (cycles per second). Grey discovered that this stimulated similar brainwave activity.

Research by Thomas Budzynski, Oestrander et al., in the use of brain machines suggest that photic driving via the suprachiasmatic nucleus and direct electrical stimulation and driving via other mechanisms and modalities, may entrain processes of the brain facilitating rapid and enhanced learning, produce deep relaxation, euphoria, an increase in creativity, and problem solving propensity may be associated with enhanced concentration and accelerated learning. The theta range and the border area between alpha and theta has generated considerable research interest.

=== Kinesthetic driving and somatic art ===
Charles Tart provides a useful working definition of kinesthetic driving. It is the induction of trance through the sense of touch, feeling, or emotions. Kinesthetic driving works through a process known as entrainment.

The rituals practiced by some athletes in preparing for contests are dismissed as superstition, but this is a device of sport psychologists to help them to attain an ecstasy-like state. Joseph Campbell had a peak experience whilst running. Roger Bannister on breaking the four-minute mile (Cameron, 1993: 185): "No longer conscious of my movement, I discovered a new unity with nature. I had found a new source of power and beauty, a source I never dreamt existed." Roger Bannister later became a distinguished neurologist.

Mechanisms and disciplines that include kinesthetic driving may include: dancing, walking meditation, yoga and asana, mudra, juggling, poi (juggling), etc.

Sufism (the mystical branch of Islam) has theoretical and metaphoric texts regarding ecstasy as a state of connection with Allah. Sufi practice rituals (dhikr, sema) use body movement and music to achieve the state.

== Types and varieties ==
- Agape or "Divine Love": the term agape appears in the Odyssey twice, where the word describes something that creates contentedness within the speaker.
- Bhakti: (Devanāgarī: भक्ति) is a word of Sanskrit origin meaning "devotion" and also "the path of devotion" itself, as in Bhakti-yoga. Within Hinduism the word is used exclusively to denote devotion to a particular deity or form of God. Within Vaishnavism bhakti is only used in conjunction with Vishnu or one of his associated incarnations, it is likewise used towards Shiva by followers of Shaivism. Saints in these traditions exhibit different trance states or ecstasy.
- Communion: In the monotheistic tradition, religious ecstasy is usually associated with communion and oneness with God. Indeed, ecstasy is the primary vehicle for the type of prophetic visions and revelations found in the Bible. However, such experiences can also be personal mystical experiences with no significance to anyone but the person experiencing them.
- In Christianity, the ecstatic experiences of the Apostles Peter and Paul are recorded in Acts 10:10, 11:5 and 22:17.
- In hagiography (writings on the subject of Christian saints) many instances are recorded in which saints are granted ecstasies. According to the Catholic Encyclopedia, religious ecstasy (called supernatural ecstasy) includes two elements: one, interior and invisible, in which the mind rivets its attention on a religious subject, and another, corporeal and visible, in which the activity of the senses is suspended, reducing the effect of external sensations upon the subject and rendering him or her resistant to awakening.
- Maenads and Bacchae: in Greek mythology, Maenads were female worshippers of Dionysus, the Greek god of mystery, wine and intoxication, and the Roman god Bacchus. The word literally translates as "raving ones". They were known as wild, insane women who could not be reasoned with. The mysteries of Dionysus inspired the women to ecstatic frenzy; they indulged in copious amounts of violence, bloodletting, sexual activity, self-intoxication, and mutilation. They were usually pictured as crowned with vine leaves, clothed in fawnskins and carrying the thyrsus, and dancing with wild abandon. They were also characterized as entranced women, wandering through the forests and hills. The Maenads were also known as Bassarids (or Bacchae or Bacchantes) in Roman mythology, after the penchant of the equivalent Roman god, Bacchus, to wear a fox-skin, a bassaris.
- Norse berserkers were said to have often entered battle entrenched in a state of primal rage, biting their shields, and howling like wolves. This fanaticism was so powerful that they were known to continue fighting even after having lost limbs or being otherwise deeply wounded.
- Peak experiences: is a term developed by Abraham Maslow and used to describe certain extra-personal and ecstatic states, particularly ones tinged with themes of unification, harmonization, and interconnectedness. Participants characterize these experiences, and the revelations imparted therein, as possessing an ineffably mystical (or overtly religious) quality or essence.
- Rapture or religious ecstasy: is an altered state of consciousness characterized by greatly reduced external awareness and expanded interior mental and spiritual awareness which is frequently accompanied by visions and emotional/intuitive (and sometimes physical) euphoria. Although the experience is usually brief in physical time, there are records of such experiences lasting several days or even more, and of recurring experiences of ecstasy during one's lifetime. Subjective perception of time, space, and/or self may strongly change or disappear during ecstasy.
- Samādhi: yoga provides techniques to attain a state of ecstasy called samādhi. According to practitioners, there are various stages of ecstasy, the highest of which is called Nirvikalpa samādhi. Different traditions have different understanding of Samādhi.
- Some charismatic Christians practice ecstatic states (called, e.g., "being slain in the Spirit") and interpret these as given by the Holy Spirit.
- Trance states have also long been used by shamans, mystics, and fakirs in healing rituals, being particularly cultivated in some religions, such as Tibetan Buddhism. Australian shamanism has been observed.

== Divination ==
Divination is a cultural universal which anthropologists have observed as being present in many religions and cultures in all ages up to the present day (see sibyl). Divination may be defined as a mechanism for fortune-telling by ascertaining information by interpretation of omens or an alleged supernatural agency. Divination often entails ritual, and is often facilitated by trance.

=== Nechung Oracle ===
In Tibet, oracles have played, and continue to play, an important part in religion and government. The word oracle is used by Tibetans to refer to the spirit, deity or entity that enters those men and women who act as media between the natural and the spiritual realms. The media are, therefore, known as kuten, which literally means, "the physical basis".

The Dalai Lama, who lives in exile in northern India, still consults an oracle known as the Nechung Oracle, which is considered the official state oracle of the government of Tibet. He gives a complete description of the process of trance and possession in his book Freedom in Exile.

== Scientific disciplines ==
Convergent disciplines of neuroanthropology, ethnomusicology, electroencephalography (EEG), neurotheology, and cognitive neuroscience, amongst others, are conducting research into the trance induction of altered states of consciousness resulting from neuron entrainment with the driving of sensory modalities, for example polyharmonics, multiphonics, and percussive polyrhythms through the channel of the auditory and kinesthetic modality.

Neuroanthropology and cognitive neuroscience are conducting research into the trance induction of altered states of consciousness (possibly engendering higher consciousness) resulting from neuron firing entrainment with these polyharmonics and multiphonics. Related research has been conducted into neural entraining with percussive polyrhythms. The timbre of traditional singing bowls and their polyrhythms and multiphonics are considered meditative and calming, and the harmony inducing effects of this tool to potentially alter consciousness are being explored by scientists, medical professionals and therapists.

== Brainwaves and brain rhythms ==
Scientific advancement and new technologies such as computerized EEG, positron emission tomography, regional cerebral blood flow, and nuclear magnetic resonance imaging, are providing measurable tools to assist in understanding trance phenomena.

There are four principal brainwave states that range from high-amplitude, low-frequency delta to low-amplitude, high-frequency beta. These states range from deep dreamless sleep to a state of high arousal. These four brainwave states are common throughout humans. All levels of brainwaves exist in everyone at all times, even though one is foregrounded depending on the activity level. When a person is in an aroused state and exhibiting a beta brainwave pattern, their brain also exhibits a component of alpha, theta, and delta, even though only a trace may be present.

The University of Philadelphia study on some Christians at the Freedom Valley Worship Center in Gettysburg, Pennsylvania, revealed that glossolalia-speaking (vocalizing or praying in unrecognizable form of language which is seen in members of certain Christian sects) activates areas of the brain out of voluntary control. In addition, the frontal lobe of the brain, which monitors speech, significantly diminished in activity as the study participants spoke glossolalia. Dr. Andrew B. Newberg, in analysis of his earlier studies as opposed to the MRI scans of the test subjects, stated that Buddhist monks in meditation and Franciscan nuns in prayer exhibited increased activity in the frontal lobe, and subsequently their behaviors, very much under voluntary control. The investigation found this particular beyond-body-control characteristic only in tongue-speakers (also see xenoglossia).

Studies have been conducted in France and Belgium on a French woman who has received extensive training in the Mongolian shamanic tradition and becomes therefore capable of self-inducing a trance state. Quantitative EEG mapping and low resolution electromagnetic tomography show that shamanic trance involves a shift from the normally dominant left analytical to the right experiential mode of self-experience, and from the normally dominant anterior prefrontal to the posterior somatosensory mode.

== See also ==
- Autohypnosis – Form, process, or result of a self-induced hypnotic state
- Hypnagogia – State of consciousness leading into sleep
- Hypnopompia – State of consciousness leading out of sleep
- Hypnosis – State of increased suggestibility
- Self-hypnosis – Form, process, or result of a self-induced hypnotic state
- Unio Mystica – Traditions of human transformation aided by religious experiences
- Wajad – Islamic term for spiritual ecstasy
