= AAPB =

AAPB may refer to:

- Aerobic anoxygenic phototrophic bacteria
- American Archive of Public Broadcasting
- American Association of Pathologists and Bacteriologists
- American Association of Professional Baseball
- Association for Applied Psychophysiology and Biofeedback
