= BCB =

BCB can mean:

== Government, politics, & industry ==
- Banco Central do Brasil (Central Bank of Brazil), a state-owned bank and principal monetary authority
- Banque de Crédit de Bujumbura, a commercial bank in Burundi
- Bauer College of Business, an academic college at the University of Houston
- Board Certified in Biofeedback, a certification administered by the Biofeedback Certification Institute of America
- Central Bolívar Bloc, a Colombian paramilitary organization known by the Spanish initials BCB

== Science ==
- Benzocyclobutene, a polycyclic aromatic hydrocarbon
- Brilliant cresyl blue, a supravital stain

== Sport ==
- Bangladesh Cricket Board, the main governing body for cricket in Bangladesh
- Bermuda Cricket Board, the main governing body for cricket in Bermuda
- Border City Brawlers, roller derby league from Windsor, Ontario
- British Championship Basketball, second tier men’s professional basketball league in Great Britain

== Technology ==
- Borland C++ Builder, a popular rapid application development (RAD) environment

== Transport ==
- Burscough Bridge railway station, the National Rail station designated BCB
- BCB, the IATA airport code for the Virginia Tech Montgomery Executive Airport in Blacksburg, Virginia

== Other ==
- Body cavity bomb, an explosive device hidden in the body
