= Biofeedback Certification International Alliance =

- Formation: 1981
- Type: non-profit
- Headquarters: Wheat Ridge, CO
- Members: 1500
- Chairman: Fredric Shaffer, PhD, BCB
- Staff: 1
- Website: http://www.bcia.org/

The Biofeedback Certification International Alliance (BCIA) is an organization that issues certificates for biofeedback, which is "gaining awareness of biological processes".

Biofeedback Certification Institute of America was established in 1981 as a non-profit organization. BCIA is a member of the Institute for Credentialing Excellence (ICE). BCIA certifies individuals who meet education and training standards in biofeedback and neurofeedback and progressively recertifies those who satisfy continuing education requirements. BCIA certification has been endorsed by the Mayo Clinic, the Association for Applied Psychophysiology and Biofeedback (AAPB), the International Society for Neurofeedback and Research (ISNR), and the Washington State Legislature.

BCIA has advanced this mission by developing rigorous ethical standards, Blueprints of Knowledge, core reading lists, and examinations based on the reading lists for its three main certification programs. BCIA serves the international community and the field by requiring that its certificants demonstrate entry-level competence and agree to follow its ethical code. Recertification encourages certificants to increase and update their knowledge of the field. BCIA is administered by a professional staff that is supervised by an independent board of directors of clinicians, educators, and researchers in the field.

Regionally accredited institutions in the United States and Europe have adopted the BCIA Blueprints of Knowledge. These include Alliant International University, Cal State Fullerton, East Carolina University, Forest Institute of Professional Psychology, Kansas State University, Niagara County Community College, Nova Southeastern University, San Francisco State University, Saybrook Graduate School, Sigmund Freud University (Austria), Sonoma State University, Southwest College of Naturopathic Medicine, St. Mary's University, Texas, Truman State University, the University of Maryland, the University of North Texas, the University of South Florida, and Widener University. Saybrook Graduate School and Widener University also provide distance education. BCIA has responded to growing international interest in its certification by approving new training programs in Hong Kong, Japan, and Taiwan.

Professionals certified by BCIA in General Biofeedback may refer to themselves as Board Certified in Biofeedback (BCB), in Neurofeedback as Board Certified in Neurofeedback (BCN), and Pelvic Muscle Dysfunction Biofeedback as Board Certified in Biofeedback for Pelvic Muscle Dysfunction (BCB-PMD). The majority of BCIA's international certificants practice in Canada, Europe, Asia, and Australia.

== Biofeedback and neurofeedback ==
The American Psychological Association has named biofeedback as a clinical proficiency.

The Association for Applied Psychophysiology and Biofeedback (AAPB), the Biofeedback Certification Institution of America (BCIA), and the International Society for Neurofeedback and Research (ISNR) approved the following definition of biofeedback on May 18, 2008:

Biofeedback is a process that enables an individual to learn how to change physiological activity for the purposes of improving health and performance. Precise instruments measure physiological activity such as brainwaves, heart function, breathing, muscle activity, and skin temperature. These instruments rapidly and accurately 'feed back' information to the user. The presentation of this information — often in conjunction with changes in thinking, emotions, and behavior — supports desired physiological changes. Over time, these changes can endure without continued use of an instrument.

The neurofeedback training (NFT) is the use of monitoring devices to provide moment-to-moment information to an individual on the state of their physiological functioning.

== The Meaning of Certification ==
BCIA is a non-profit organization without governmental powers to regulate biofeedback and neurofeedback practice. While BCIA certification means that candidates have satisfied entry-level requirements in biofeedback, neurofeedback (also called EEG biofeedback), or pelvic muscle dysfunction biofeedback, certificants may require a government license for independent practice when treating medical or psychological disorders. Licensed certificants must operate within the scope of their license and must practice within their areas of expertise. Where the government regulates biofeedback and neurofeedback services, unlicensed certificants must be supervised by a licensed professional and operate within the scope of their supervisor's license when treating disorders. Unlicensed certificants who provide biofeedback/neurofeedback training for educational or optimal performance purposes do not require licensed supervision. Where the government does not regulate the treatment of medical or psychological disorders, certificants should practice in accord with the laws of their state, province, or country. All certificants must practice within their personal areas of expertise.

== BCIA certification programs ==
BCIA certifies individuals with appropriate health care backgrounds in general biofeedback, neurofeedback, and pelvic muscle dysfunction (PMDB) biofeedback. BCIA also certifies Academics and Technicians in general biofeedback and neurofeedback. While individuals certified in general biofeedback may use all biofeedback modalities and adjunctive procedures, those exclusively certified in neurofeedback are limited to EEG biofeedback and adjunctive procedures. PMDB certification is only for licensed health care providers who use SEMG biofeedback to treat elimination disorders and pelvic pain. The BCIA website provides a detailed explanation of the requirements for certification and recertification.

== Clinical certification ==
Clinical Certification is available for biofeedback, neurofeedback, and PMDB biofeedback. This program is designed for individuals with appropriate health care backgrounds who treat medical and/or psychological disorders, either independently under their license or under appropriate supervision. Applicants must at least possess a bachelor's degree in a clinical health care area from a regionally accredited academic institution. Candidates must document their completion of didactic education and mentored clinical training, pass a certification exam, and agree to follow BCIA's Professional Standards and Ethical Principles and applicable governmental and professional rules. BCIA has adopted a mentoring/consultation model of supervision. BCIA provides blueprints and core reading lists to guide didactic education and exam preparation.

== Board certification in biofeedback (BCB) ==
The BCIA didactic education requirement includes a 48-hour course from a regionally accredited academic institution or a BCIA-approved training program that covers the complete General Biofeedback Blueprint of Knowledge and study of human anatomy and physiology. The General Biofeedback Blueprint of Knowledge areas include: I. Orientation to Biofeedback, II. Stress, Coping, and Illness, III. Psychophysiological Recording, IV. Surface Electromyographic (SEMG) Applications, V. Autonomic Nervous System (ANS) Applications, VI. Electroencephalographic (EEG) Applications, VII. Adjunctive Interventions, and VIII. Professional Conduct.

Applicants may demonstrate their knowledge of human anatomy and physiology by completing a course in human anatomy, human physiology, or human biology provided by a regionally accredited academic institution or a BCIA-approved training program or by successfully completing an Anatomy and Physiology exam covering the organization of the human body and its systems. Applicants must also document practical skills training that includes 20 contact hours supervised by a BCIA-approved mentor designed to them teach how to apply clinical biofeedback skills through self-regulation training, 50 patient/client sessions, and case conference presentations. Distance learning allows applicants to complete didactic course work over the internet. Distance mentoring trains candidates from their residence or office. They must recertify every 4 years, complete 55 hours of continuing education during each review period or complete the written exam, and attest that their license/credential (or their supervisor's license/credential) has not been suspended, investigated, or revoked.

== Board certification in neurofeedback (BCN) ==
The BCIA didactic education requirement includes a 36-hour course from a regionally accredited academic institution or a BCIA-approved training program that covers the complete Neurofeedback Blueprint of Knowledge and study of human anatomy and physiology. The Neurofeedback Blueprint of Knowledge areas include: I. Orientation to EEG Biofeedback, II. Basic Neurophysiology and Neuroanatomy, III. Instrumentation and Electronics, IV. Research, V. Psychopharmacological Considerations, VI. Treatment Planning, and VII. Professional Conduct.

Applicants may demonstrate their knowledge of human anatomy and physiology by completing a course in human anatomy, human physiology, human biology, or neuroanatomy provided by a regionally accredited academic institution or a BCIA-approved training program or by successfully completing an Anatomy and Physiology exam over the organization of the human body and its systems. Applicants must also document practical skills training that includes 25 contact hours supervised by a BCIA-approved mentor designed to teach them how to apply clinical neurofeedback skills through self-regulation training, 100 patient/client sessions, and case conference presentations. They must recertify every 4 years, complete 55 hours of continuing education during each review period or complete the written exam, and attest that their license/credential (or their supervisor's license/credential) has not been suspended, investigated, or revoked.

== Board certification in pelvic muscle dysfunction biofeedback (BCB-PMD) ==
Pelvic Muscle Dysfunction Biofeedback (PMDB) encompasses "elimination disorders and chronic pelvic pain syndromes." The BCIA didactic education requirement includes a 28-hour course from a regionally accredited academic institution or a BCIA-approved training program that covers the complete Pelvic Muscle Dysfunction Biofeedback Blueprint of Knowledge and study of human anatomy and physiology. The Pelvic Muscle Dysfunction Biofeedback areas include: I. Applied Psychophysiology and Biofeedback, II. Pelvic Floor Anatomy, Assessment, and Clinical Procedures, III. Clinical Disorders: Bladder Dysfunction, IV. Clinical Disorders: Bowel Dysfunction, and V. Chronic Pelvic Pain Syndromes.

Currently, only licensed health care providers may apply for this certification. Applicants must also document practical skills training that includes a 4-hour practicum/personal training session and 12 contact hours spent with a BCIA-approved mentor designed to them teach how to apply clinical biofeedback skills through 30 patient/client sessions and case conference presentations. They must recertify every 3 years, complete 36 hours of continuing education or complete the written exam, and attest that their license/credential has not been suspended, investigated, or revoked.

== Academic certification (BCB-A and BCN-A) ==
Academic Certification is available for biofeedback and neurofeedback. This program is designed for professionals who utilize biofeedback and/or neurofeedback in educational, research, or supervisory settings and who do not clinically treat medical or psychological disorders. Applicants must at least possess a master's degree from a regionally accredited academic institution. They must satisfy the same didactic education requirements and pass the same certification exams as clinicians. They must document 10 contact hours with a BCIA-approved mentor that cover basic instrumentation, sensor placements, and personal self-regulation. They must agree to follow BCIA's Professional Standards and Ethical Principles and applicable governmental and professional rules. Academic Certificants must complete recertification every 4 years like their clinician counterparts.

== Board certified biofeedback technician (BCB-T) and board certified neurofeedback technician (BCN-T) ==
Technician-Level Certification is available for biofeedback and neurofeedback. This program is intended for individuals who use biofeedback and neurofeedback modalities under a supervisor's license when treating a medical or psychological disorder and who lack a clinical degree. They must satisfy the same didactic education requirements and pass the same certification exams as clinicians and academics. They must document 10 contact hours with a BCIA-approved mentor that cover instrumentation, sensor placements, and personal self-regulation, and complete 20 supervised patient sessions. All candidates must agree to abide by BCIA's Professional Standards and Ethical Principles and follow all applicable laws. While they may attach sensors and treat medical/psychological disorders under supervision as allowed by law, their supervisor is responsible for diagnosis, treatment planning, and patient care. Technician-Level Certificants must complete recertification every 4 years like their clinician and academic counterparts. Their continuing education requirements, however, are considerably lower.

== Certification by prior experience (CPE) ==
Certification by Prior Experience (CPE) in general biofeedback, neurofeedback, and pelvic muscle dysfunction biofeedback is intended for individuals who have exceeded BCIA entry-level certification requirements through their lifetime experience in the field. The didactic education and experience standards for CPE are more demanding than those for entry-level certification since this program is designed for leaders in biofeedback and neurofeedback. CPE for Clinicians requires a license/credential for independent practice, 3,000 hours of experience, and 100 hours of continuing education.

== International certification ==
BCIA has certified professionals in 24 countries. BCIA promotes international certification by supporting regionally accredited universities and BCIA-accredited training programs worldwide, encouraging their adoption of its blueprints and core reading lists, and listing these programs on its website. BCIA has also advanced international certification by promoting distance mentoring, providing written and online examinations, offering online continuing education, and partnering with national and regional biofeedback organizations in several countries.

== Executive directors ==
1969 to 2009 - Francine Butler, PhD, CAE, CMP

2007 to 2011 - David L. Stumph, IOM, CAE
