= Thomas Budzynski =

American psychologist (1933–2011)

Thomas H. Budzynski
- Born: October 13, 1933; Grand Rapids, Michigan
- Died: February 14, 2011 (aged 77); Poulsbo, Washington
- Occupations: Psychologist, teacher, writer, speaker
- Writing career
- Genre: Research

Thomas Hice Budzynski (13 October 1933 – 14 February 2011) was an American psychologist and a pioneer in the field of biofeedback, inventing one of the first electromyographic biofeedback training systems in the mid-1960s. In the early 1970s, he developed the Twilight Learner in collaboration with John Picchiottino. The Twilight Learner was one of the first neurotherapy systems.

Budzynski earned a BSEE at the University of Detroit and served as an aerospace inertial systems engineer on the SR-71 Blackbird project at Area 51. He later received a master's and a PhD in psychology.

Budzynski was a licensed psychologist in the State of Washington. He was an Affiliate Professor at the University of Washington in Seattle, where he also conducted neurotechnology research with his wife, Helen Kogan Budzynski. He conducted studies on the effects of audio-visual stimulation on the brain; the priming effects of binaural tones as measured by the EEG; chronic fatigue syndrome; and applications for chronic pain, enhanced academic performance, and the enhancement of cognitive processes in individuals with head injuries, learning disorders, and the elderly.

Budzynski's research and clinical findings were published in professional journals including: the Journal of Applied Behavioral Analysis; Experimental & Clinical Psychopharmacology; the Journal of Behavior Therapy and Experimental Psychiatry; Biofeedback and Self-Control; Biofeedback: Behavioral Medicine; Psychosomatic Medicine; the Journal of Dental Research; Biofeedback and Self-Regulation; Consciousness and Self-Regulation; Psychology Today; Somatics; Education; the Journal of Neurotherapy; Applied Neurophysiology and Brainwave Biofeedback; Clinical Neurophysiology; and NeuroImage.

Budzynski gave lectures at conferences, including several Annual Meetings of the Biofeedback Research Society; Annual Meetings of the American Psychological Association; Annual Meetings of the Association for Applied Psychophysiology and Biofeedback; Stanford University; University of Washington; the University of Oxford; LMU Munich; and Heinrich Heine University Düsseldorf, Germany.

Budzynski developed a series of Life Management subliminal and priming recordings. Applying his research on brainwave activity, he created peak performance tools utilizing research and theory on brain lateralization, lateralized emotions, dual track brain messaging, binaural beats, and priming. These techniques are used in coping with psychological stress and anxiety, as well as enhancing memory, self-confidence, self-esteem and relaxation.

He maintained a private practice of neurofeedback, biofeedback, and psychotherapy in his clinic in Poulsbo, Washington.

Budzynski died suddenly of a heart attack on February 14, 2011.

== Honors ==
In 1999, he received the Distinguished Scientist Award from the Association for Applied Psychophysiology and Biofeedback at their annual meeting in Vancouver, BC, Canada. In 2002 he received a Career Achievement award from the International Society for Neuronal Research. Thomas H. Budzynski, James R. Evans, Andrew Abarbanel, and Helen Kogan Budzynski co-authored Introduction to Quantitative EEG and Neurofeedback: Advanced Theory and Applications, 2nd Edition, published December 2008 by Elsevier. New treatment protocols are outlined in this edition for treating posttraumatic stress disorder, attention deficit hyperactivity disorder, Asperger syndrome, depression, and anxiety disorders through the use of neurofeedback, QEEG, music therapy, and the LORETA diagnostic tool. In 2003 he received the CAAPB Johann Stoyva award.

He was president of the Biofeedback Research Society (now, the Association for Applied Psychophysiology and Biofeedback/ AAPB) from 1974 to 1975; and president of the EEG Biofeedback Section of AAPB (1995–1996).

== Bibliography ==
=== Books ===
- Thomas H. Budzynski, Helen Kogan Budzynski, James R. Evans, and Andrew Abarbanel, Introduction to Quantitative EEG and Neurofeedback: Advanced Theory and Applications, 2nd Edition, Elsevier, December 2008

=== Articles ===
- Budzynski, T. H. & Stoyva, J. M. (1969). An instrument for producing deep muscle relaxation by means of analog information feedback. Journal of Applied Behavior Analysis, 2, 231–237.
- Budzynski, T.H., Stoyva, J. M. & Adler, C.S. (1970). Feedback-induced muscle relaxation: Application to tension headache. Journal of Behavior Therapy and Experimental Psychiatry, 1, 205–211.Republished in N.E. Miller, et al. (Eds.) (1970). Biofeedback Annual: 1970 Papers. Chicago: Aldine.Republished in F.J. McGuigan, & P.J. Woods (Eds.) (1972). Contemporary Studies in Psychology. New York: Appleton-Century-Crofts.
- Budzynski, T.H. (1972). Biofeedback procedures in the clinic. In Birk, L. (Ed.). Biofeedback: Behavioral Medicine, New York: Holt, Rinehart & Winston.*
- Budzynski, T.H. (1972). Some applications of biofeedback-produced twilight states. Fields within Fields . . . within Fields. 5, 105–114.Republished in D. Shapiro, et al. (Eds.) (1973). Biofeedback and Self-Control. Chicago: Aldine-Atherton.
- Budzynski, T.H. & Stoyva, J. M. (1972). Biofeedback techniques in behavior therapy. In Birbaumer, N. (Ed.), Die Bewaltingung von Angst. Beitrage der Neuropsychologie zur Angstforschung. (The Mastery of Anxiety. Contributions to Anxiety Research). Reihe Fortschritte der Klinischen Psychologic, Ed. 4. München, Wien: Verlag, Urban & Schwarzenberg. Republished in D. Shapiro, et al. (Eds.) (1973,. Biofeedback and Self-Control, Chicago: Aldine-Atherton.
- Budzynski, T.H. (1973). Biofeedback procedures in the clinic. Seminars in Psychiatry, 5, 537–547.
- Budzynski, T.H. (1973). Biofeedback procedures in the clinic. In L. Birk (Ed.), Biofeedback: Behavioral medicine. New York: Grune & Stratton, pp. 177–187.
- Budzynski, T.H. & Stoyva, J.M. (1973). An electromyographic feedback technique for teaching voluntary relaxation of the masseter. Journal of Dental Research, 52,116–119.
- Budzynski, T.H., Stoyva, J.M., Adler, C.S. & Mullaney, D. (1973). EMG biofeedback and tension headache: A controlled outcome study. Psychosomatic Medicine, 35, 484 496.
- Budzynski, T.H., Stoyva, J.M., Adler, C.S. & Mullaney, D. (1973). EMG biofeedback and tension headache: A controlled outcome study. In L. Birk (Ed.), Biofeedback: Behavioral medicine. New York: Grune & Stratton, pp. 37–50.
- Stoyva, J.M. & Budzynski, T.H. (1975). Biofeedback in general and specific anxiety disorders. In H. Legewie, & L. Nusselt (Eds.), Biofeedback-therapie: Lernmethoden in der Psychosomatics, Neurologie und Rehabilitation (Fortschritte der Klinischen Psychologie, Vol. 6). München-Berlin: Urban & Schwarzenberg.
- Budzynski, T.H. & Padnes, S. (Eds.) (1976). How to make the involuntary voluntary. A Roche Scientific Series of Eight Monographs. Nutley, NJ: Hoffman-LaRoche.
- Sittenfeld, P., Budzynski, T. & Stoyva, J. (1976). Differential shaping of EEG theta rhythms. Biofeedback and Self-Regulation, 1, 31–45.
- Fowler, J., Budzynski, T. & VandenBerg, R. (1976). Effects of an EMG biofeedback and relaxation program on the control of diabetes. Biofeedback and Self-Regulation, 1, 105–112.
- Budzynski, T.H. (1976). Biofeedback and the twilight states of consciousness. In G.E. Schwartz, & D. Shapiro (Eds.), Consciousness and Self-Regulation, Vol. 1. New York: Plenum Press.
- Budzynski, T.H. (1977). Tuning in on the twilight zone. Psychology Today, 11, 38–44.
- Budzynski, T.H. (1977). Clinical implications of electromyographic training. In Schwartz, G.E. & Beatty, J. (Eds.), Biofeedback: Theory and Research. New York: Academic Press.
- Budzynski, T.H. (1978). Biofeedback strategies in headache. In J.V. Basmajian (Ed.), Biofeedback: A Handbook for Clinicians. Baltimore: Williams & Wilkins.
- Budzynski, T.H. (1978). Biofeedback applications to stress-related disorders. International Review of Applied Psychology, 27, 73–79.
- Budzynski, T.H. (1979). Brain lateralization and biofeedback. In B. Shapin, & T. Coly (Eds.), Brain/Mind and Parapsychology International Conference, Montreal, Canada, 1978. New York: Parapsychological Foundation.
- Budzynski, T. H. & Peffer, K.E. (1980). Biofeedback training. In I.L. Kutash, & L.B. Schlesinger (Eds.), Handbook on Stress and Anxiety. San Francisco: Jossey-Bass.
- Budzynski, T., Stoyva, J. & Peffer, K. (1980). Biofeedback techniques in psychosomatic disorders. In A. Goldstein, & E. Foa (Eds.), Handbook of Behavioral Interventions. New York: John Wiley & Sons.
- Budzynski, T.H. (1981). Brain Lateralization and re-scripting. Somatics. Spring/Summer, 3–9.
- Budzynski, T.H. (1982). Introduction to techniques for the treatment of muscle contraction headaches. In PA. Kelly & L.G. Ritt (Eds.), Innovations in Clinical Practice: A Sourcebook. Sarasota. FL: Professional Resources Exchange, Inc.
- Budzynski, T.H. & Stoyva, J.M. (1984). Biofeedback methods in the treatment of anxiety and stress. In R. Woolfolk, & P. Lehrer (Eds.), Principles and Practice of Stress Management. New York: The Guilford Press.
- Budzynski, T.H. & Doche-Budzynski, L. (1985). Douze ans d'experience de biofeedback dans une clinique privee aux U.S.A. Psychologie Medicale, 17, 1545–1550.
- Budzynski, T.H. (1986). Clinical applications of non-drug induced states. In Wolman, B.B. & Ullmann, M. (Eds.), Handbook of States of Consciousness. New York: Van Nostrand-Reinhold.
- Budzynski, T.H. (1989). Biofeedback strategies in headache treatment. In J.V. Basmajian (Ed.), Biofeedback: Principles and Practice for Clinicians, (3rd ed.). Baltimore: Williams & Wilkins.
- Doche-Budzynski, L. & Budzynski, T. (1989). Subliminal self-esteem enhancement in adult Type A males. Education, 110, 50–56.

Cram, J.R. & Budzynski, T.H. (1989). Biofeedback and relaxation therapies. In C.D. Tollison, & M.L. Krieger (Eds.), Interdisciplinary Rehabilitation of low back pain. Baltimore: Williams & Wilkins.

- Budzynski, T.H. (1989). Pain Control. A four phase audiotape program with manual. Montreal: Thought Technology, Ltd.
- Budzynski, T.H. (1990). Hemispheric asymmetry and REST. In P. Suedfeld, J.W. Turner, Jr., & T.H. Fine (Eds.), Restricted Environmental Stimulation: Theoretical and Empirical Developments in Flotation REST. New York: Springer-Verlag.
- Budzynski, T.H. (1991). Selected Research on Light/Sound. Synetics Systems. Seattle, WA.
- Budzynski, T.H. (1991). Clinical Considerations of Light/Sound. Synetics Systems. Seattle, WA.
- Stoyva, J.M., & Budzynski, T.H. (1993). Biofeedback methods in the treatment of anxiety and stress disorders. In R. Woolfolk, & P. Lehrer (Eds.), Principles and Practice of Stress Management (2nd Ed). New York: Guilford.
- Rozelle, G.R., & Budzynski, T.H. (1995). Neurotherapy for stroke rehabilitation: A single case study. Biofeedback & Self-Regulation, 20, 211–228.

Budzynski, T.H. (1995). Virtual reality biofeedback: A brief concept paper. Biofeedback, Fall.

- Budzynski, T., & Andrasik, F. (1995). The Ponce de Leon Project: Brain Brightening. Report on pilot study. Pensacola, FL: Center for Behavioral Research, University of West Florida.
- Budzynski, T.H. (1996). Brain Brightening: Can Neurofeedback Improve Cognitive Process? Biofeedback, 24, 14–17.

Billiott, K.M., Budzynski, T.H., Andrasik, F. (1997). EEG patterns and Chronic Fatigue Syndrome. Journal of Neurotherapy, 2, 20–30.

- Budzynski, T.H. (in press). Twilight learning revisited. In R. Kall, J. Kamiya, & G.E. Schwartz (Eds.). Applied Neurophysiology and Brainwave Biofeedback. Bensalem, PA: Futurehealth, Inc.
- Budzynski, T.H. (1999). From EEG to Neurofeedback. In J.R. Evans & A. Abarbanel (Eds.). Introduction to Quantitative EEG and Neurofeedback. San Diego: Academic Press.
- Budzynski, T., Jordy, J., Kogan Budzynski, H., Tang, J., & Claypoole, K. (1999). Academic performance enhancement with photic stimulation and EDR feedback. Journal of Neurotherapy, 3, 11–21.
- Budzynski, T.H. (2000). Reversing age-related cognitive decline: Use of neurofeedback and audio-visual stimulation. Biofeedback, 28, 19–21.
- Budzynski, T.H., Kogan Budzynski, H., Fischer, M., Ashton, S., Goldberg, J., & Buchwald, D. (2003). A study of quantified EEG among monozygotic twins discordant for Chronic Fatigue Syndrome. (Resubmitted for a second time with revisions to Clinical Neurophysiology).
- Budzynski, T.H. (2005). Best practices: An interview with Dr. Tom Budzynski. ISNR Newsletter, April 2005.
- Budzynski, T.H., Budzynski, H.K., & Tang, H.Y. (2007). Brain brightening: Restoring the aging mind. In J.R. Evans (Ed.). Handbook of Neurofeedback: Dynamics and Clinical Applications. New York: Haworth Press.
- Sherlin, L., Budzynski, T., Budzynski, H.K., Congedo, M., Fischer, M. E., & Buchwald*, D. (2007). Low-resolution electromagnetic tomography in monozygotic twins discordant for Chronic Fatigue Syndrome. NeuroImage, 34, 1438–1442.
- Budzynski, T. & Budzynski, H. Maret, K., & Tang, H.Y. (2008). The Effect of Lifewave Energy Technology on Heart Rate Variability: A Double-Blind Experimental Pilot Study. Journal of Neurotherapy, 11,
