= Rheoencephalography =

Rheoencephalography (REG) a technique of continuous registration of cerebral blood flow. An electronic device called a rheoencephalograph is used in rheoencephalography. Electrodes are attached to the cranium at specific points on the head and allow the device to continuously measure the electrical conductivity of the tissue located between the electrodes. A rheoencephalograph is also used for brain blood flow biofeedback.
