= OpEdNews =

American news and opinion website

- OpEdNews site logo
- Available in: English
- Owner: Rob Kall
- Creator: Rob Kall
- Editor: Rob Kall (Editor in chief)
- Website: opednews.com
- Registration: Optional
- Users: 36,000 +
- Launched: 28 February 2003; 23 years ago
- Current status: Active

OpEdNews is a United States–based progressive/liberal news, antiwar activism, and opinion website founded by Rob Kall in 2003.

It is a hybrid news, community blog and article aggregation site that publishes opinion-based articles, news stories, and diaries while its mission, according to the site, is to "... provide a content management, social networking website that supports progressive communications resources and tools for activism and advocacy organizations." Being a news-source for many mainstream media, independent websites and blogs, OpedNews calls itself "a Drudge Report for progressives".

The site regularly features articles by journalists (including media critic Jeff Cohen and Pulitzer Prize winner Chris Hedges), politicians (including US Senator Bernie Sanders and former U.S. Representative Dennis Kucinich), and commentators and activists (including Michael Moore and Medea Benjamin) as well as first-time writers.

In 2014, technorati ranked OpEdNews.com among the top 100 blogs for politics, uspolitics. world, green, and health, and listed it as among the "Top 100 blogs overall", while Mediaite showed founder Kall ranked as one of the top 200 print/online columnists.

== Background ==
In early 2003, Kall had heard a Colin Powell speech about why the United States "had" to go to war with Iraq and felt that Powell's reasons were disingenuous. Wishing to "publish the Truth", Kall began a personal blog which developed into OpEdNews.

OEN is a publication for the people. In the evolution of it I listened to the readers, writers, and editors. The more I listened to these people, the better the site did. Hardly anything is assigned – it's just people writing about what they want out there, and expressing what they care about. Oped News is written by regular people. Watchdog organizations, whistle-blowers, and people interested in social responsibility like us because we're inclined to publish them. One of the main purposes of Oped News is to give the people who know the real truth an opportunity to be heard. We get between 1000 and 2000 articles submitted each month.

— [sic] Rob Kall

== Editorial philosophy ==
OpEdNews' goal is to be holistic, to cover politics, arts (movies, books, music, theater, etc.,) sciences, health, mass media, business, technology, sports, travel, citizen journalism and various strange and unusual stuff.

OpEdNews uses a custom built content management system designed by founder Rob Kall, produced by populum.com. It includes features not found in other blog/media content management sites, such as an image search and insertion program that finds creative commons images and inserts them in content with attribution automatically included, a multi-level editing system that allows editors with different degrees of responsibility to access a queue of submitted articles and edit then accept or reject them. The site has over 50 editors who volunteer their time to review hundreds of submissions each month.

Opednews is one of 4500 websites indexed by Google News.

== Editorial staff ==
Senior Editorial Board:

- Executive editor: Rob Kall
- Managing editors: Sheila Samples, Meryl Ann Butler, Scott Baker
- Senior editors: Joan Brunwasser, Josh Mitteldorf, Jerry Policoff, Marta Steele,

== Recognition ==
OpEdNews founder Rob Kall is ranked by Mediaite as one of the top 200 online/print columnists.

The site was a nominee in the 2007 Blogger's Choice Awards for 'Best Political Blog', 'Best Blog Design', and 'Best Education Blog.

In 2013, Opednews (new media) and founder Rob Kall became the first media winners of the Pillar Human Rights Award for International Persons of Conscience for supporting whistleblowers and the first amendment, awarded by the 2013 Whistleblower Summit for Civil & Human Rights as hosted by ACORN 8 and Federally Employed Women-Legal Education Fund (FEW/LEF).
