= Interbeat interval =

Interbeat interval (IBI) is a scientific term used in the study of the mammalian heart.

== Definition ==
Interbeat interval is a scientific term used in reference to the time interval between individual beats of the mammalian heart. Interbeat interval is abbreviated "IBI" and is sometimes written with a hyphen, "inter-beat interval". It is also sometimes referred to as a "beat-to-beat" interval.

IBI is generally measured in units of milliseconds. In normal heart function, each IBI value varies from beat to beat. This natural variation is known as heart rate variability (HRV). However, certain cardiac conditions may cause the individual IBI values to become nearly constant, resulting in the HRV being nearly zero. This can happen, for example, during periods of exercise as the heart rate increases and the beats become regular. Certain illnesses can cause the heart rate to increase and become uniform as well, such as when a subject is afflicted by an infection.

== Recording ==
A number of instruments have been developed for specifically recording individual IBI values. Generally, the instruments are used in basic cardiology research, as there is yet no specific condition whose IBI statistics can be used to diagnose the condition or guide treatment for the condition. However, HRV is an active field of research, and IBI analysis can yield a rich amount of data that holds promise for future medical applications.

== See also ==
- Circulatory system
- Heart rate variability (HRV)
