= BCIA Inc. =

Canadian security firm

Bureau canadien d'investigation et ajustement (CBIA) inc. / Canadian Bureau of Investigations and Adjustments (CBIA) Inc. (BCIA or B.C.I.A.) was a Montreal, Quebec, Canada based security firm. The corporation was formed on May 26, 1998 by Luigi Coretti and grew to employ almost 1,000 employees in and around the cities of Montreal and Ottawa. Its primary business was providing insurance adjustment, building security and investigation services. On October 7, 2008, after moving its head office from 4230 Rang Saint-Elzéar in the City of Laval, Province of Quebec to new space located at 355 De Louvain street West, City of Montreal, Province of Quebec, the corporation announced it was expanding to offer armoured transportation services. It provided security for some buildings belonging to the Montreal police force. The company entered bankruptcy protection on April 28, 2010, citing debts of over $20 million.

== Controversies ==
B.C.I.A. received millions of dollars in financial help from the provincial government and the Caisse Desjardins. Such financial help from the provincial government made headlines because it came from a fund that was supposed to be helping outlying regions, not companies in Montreal.

B.C.I.A. owes its creditors some 20 million dollars, including some six million from a provincial regional economic development fund.

== See also ==
- Tony Tomassi
- Blackwater Worldwide
