= Association for Applied Psychophysiology and Biofeedback =

American non-profit

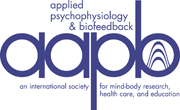
- Formation: 1969
- Type: Non-profit
- Headquarters: Aurora, CO
- Members: 2000
- President: Inna Khazan, PhD
- Website: http://www.aapb.org/

The Association for Applied Psychophysiology and Biofeedback (AAPB) was founded in 1969 as the Biofeedback Research Society (BRS). The association aims to promote understanding of biofeedback and advance the methods used in this practice. AAPB is a non-profit organization as defined in Section 501(c)(6) of the Internal Revenue Service Code.

== Definition of biofeedback ==
The American Psychological Association has named biofeedback as a clinical proficiency.

The Association for Applied Psychophysiology and Biofeedback (AAPB), the Biofeedback Certification Institution of America (BCIA), and the International Society for Neurofeedback and Research (ISNR) approved the following definition of biofeedback on May 18, 2008:

Biofeedback is a process that enables an individual to learn how to change physiological activity for the purposes of improving health and performance. Precise instruments measure physiological activity such as brainwaves, heart function, breathing, muscle activity, and skin temperature. These instruments rapidly and accurately "feed back" information to the user. The presentation of this information — often in conjunction with changes in thinking, emotions, and behavior — supports desired physiological changes. Over time, these changes can endure without continued use of an instrument.

== Journals ==
=== Applied Psychophysiology and Biofeedback ===
Applied Psychophysiology and Biofeedback is a journal devoted to study of the interrelationship of physiological systems, cognition, social and environmental parameters, and health. Priority is given to original research which contributes to the theory, practice, and evaluation of applied psychophysiology and biofeedback. Other sections are for conceptual and theoretical articles; evaluative reviews; the Clinical Forum, which includes case studies, clinical replication series, treatment protocols, and clinical notes and observations; the Discussion Forum; innovations in instrumentation; letters to the editor, comments on issues raised in articles; and book reviews. Applied Psychophysiology and Biofeedback is a publication of the Association for Applied Psychophysiology and Biofeedback. Frank Andrasik serves as the journal's editor.

=== Biofeedback: A Clinical Journal ===
Biofeedback: A Clinical Journal is a peer-reviewed, quarterly journal for biofeedback practitioners, educators, health and mental health professionals, and researchers in psychophysiology. Biofeedback includes reports on advances in biofeedback, neurofeedback, self-regulation strategies, sports physiology, personal and occupational wellness, peak performance in the arts, and scientific psychophysiology.

Biofeedback also publishes articles on practice standards and ethical principles in research and practice, feature articles on uses of biofeedback, and case studies illustrating use of mind-body therapies and principles. Priority is given to programs of research, innovative clinical programs, and technical advances. The journal also publishes historical and biographical articles on biofeedback and psychophysiology; reviews of the development of biofeedback in international settings; innovations in instrumentation and software; and book reviews. Biofeedback is an official publication of the Association for Applied Psychophysiology and Biofeedback. Leslie Shivers serves as the journal's editor.

== Teleseminar Series ==
AAPB Teleseminars present findings in topics of interest to biofeedback and neurofeedback professionals like Battle Trauma and Neurons and Neurotransmitters. Teleseminars are approved for BCIA continuing education credit, and AAPB is an approved APA continuing education sponsor. Most programs last 60-90 minutes, providing 1-1.5 hours of CE Credit. Telesminars allow professionals to earn all of the CE credits needed for professional licensure and BCIA renewal. Past programs are available to watch, but are not eligible for CE credit.

== Membership ==
Membership in AAPB is open to professionals interested in the investigation and application of applied psychophysiology and biofeedback, and in the scientific and professional advancement of the field. The AAPB has grown to more than 2,000 members representing the fields of psychology, medicine, nursing, social work, counseling, physical therapy, education, and other health care areas. Corporations can support AAPB through their Corporate Membership. There are many state chapters, and the association has members in several countries.

== Structure ==
Benefits of membership include discounts on registration for teleseminars and conferences, and book purchases, as well as access to listservs, web-listing opportunities, and access to the AAPB website's member's only area. Benefits also include online and print delivery of the Biofeedback magazine and Applied Psychophysiology and Biofeedback journal, and access to group-rate healthcare insurance through Chalice MD, and more.

== History ==
The Biofeedback Research Society (BRS) was founded in 1969. The BRS was renamed the Biofeedback Society of America (BSA) in 1976 and the Association for Applied Psychophysiology and Biofeedback (AAPB) in 1989.

== Executive Directors ==
1969 to 2009 - Francine Butler, PhD, CAE, CMP 2007 to 2010 - David L. Stumph, IOM, CAE 2011 to 2022 - Michelle Cunningham 2022 to present - Leslie Shivers, CAE

== Past presidents ==
2024-25 - Inna Khazan
2022-23 - Fredric Shaffer
2019-21 - Ethan Benore
2018 - Patrick Steffen
2017 - Gabriel Sella
2016 - Thomas Collura
2015 - Richard Harvey
2014 - Stuart Donaldson
2013 - Richard Sherman
2012 - Jeffrey Bolek
2011 - Gabriel Tan
2010 - Carmen Russoniello
2009 - John Arena
2008 - Aubrey Ewing
2007 - Alan Glaros
2006 - Richard Gevirtz
2005 - Richard Sherman
2004 - Steve Baskin
2003 - Lynda Kirk
2002 - Paul Lehrer
2001 - Donald Moss
2000 - Doil Montgomery
1999 - Dale Walters
1998 - Ian Wickramasekera
1997 - Sebastian Striefel
1996 - Joel F. Lubar
1995 - Angele McGrady
1994 - Michael McKee
1993 - Frank Andrasik
1992 - Paula B. Amar
1991 - Steven L. Wolf
1990 - J. Peter Rosenfeld
1989 - Susan Middaugh
1988 - M. Barry Sterman
1987 - Mark Schwartz
1986 - Carol Schneider
1985 - Patricia Norris
1984 - Neal Miller
1983 - John D. Rugh
1982 - Steven L. Fahrion
1981 - Bernard T. Engel
1980 - Edward Taub
1979 - John Basmajian
1978 - Elmer Green
1977 - Charles Stroebel
1976 - Erik Peper
1975 - Joe Kamiya
1974 - Thomas H. Budzynski
1973 - Gary Schwartz
1971 to 1972 - Johann Stoyva
1970 to 1971 - Thomas Mulholland
1969 to 1970 - Barbara Brown,

== AAPB Foundation ==
The AAPB Foundation was formed in 1985 at the urging of then AAPB president, Neal Miller. Miller believed that the organization should encourage the interest and application of work by students to demonstrate the efficacy of biofeedback techniques. Presently, the foundation annually supports travel scholarships to students whose papers have been accepted for presentation at the annual meeting.

The Foundation for Education and Research in Biofeedback and Related Sciences initiated a program aimed at stimulating biofeedback research at its 2009 Board meeting. The board established funding for three grants at $1,000 each. Eligibility is limited to graduate students doing research in biofeedback and related fields. The award is accompanied by a travel scholarship and a waiver of registration to attend the AAPB annual meeting where the results of the research are presented.
