= Neurosis and Human Growth: The Struggle Toward Self-Realization =

1950 book by Karen Horney

Neurosis and Human Growth
- First edition
- Author: Karen Horney
- Language: English
- Publisher: W. W. Norton & Company, Inc.
- Publication date: 1950
- Publication place: United States
- Media type: Print (hardback and paperback)
- Pages: 391
- OCLC: 1220173

Neurosis and Human Growth: The Struggle Toward Self-Realization is a 1950 book by the German-American psychoanalyst Karen Horney. It was the last book she published and the major work of her later years. In it she gives the fullest statement of the theory of neurosis she had been developing since The Neurotic Personality of Our Time (1937); her biographer Bernard J. Paris treats it as the centrepiece of what he calls her "mature theory".

For Horney, the difference between neurotic and healthy development lies in what drives a person: compulsive action rooted in anxiety, or spontaneous action arising out of the whole range of a person's feelings. A person who keeps that spontaneity grows through a process she calls self-realization, the unfolding of the individual's given potentialities. She likens it to an acorn growing into a tree in fertile soil. Where a child's early circumstances make the world look hostile, spontaneity gives way to strategies for allaying anxiety, and the child's energies go into building a self adjusted to those dangers. That development, and what it does to the adult personality, is what Horney means by neurosis.

The centre of the book is the "pride system" that takes shape along the way. Unable to feel safe or loved as it is, the child begins to idealize itself, and the idealized image hardens into a self the person believes it ought to be. What follows are the neurotic's claims on other people, a "tyranny of the should", a brittle neurotic pride, and finally self-hate turned against everything in the person that falls short of the ideal. Thirteen chapters are given to the workings of this development, one to its undoing in therapy, and a final chapter to the differences between her position and classical psychoanalytic theory.

== Background ==
Horney had broken with orthodox Freudian theory during the 1930s. Personality, she argued, is shaped less by instinctual drives than by the culture and the social relationships a child grows up in. The Neurotic Personality of Our Time (1937) and New Ways in Psychoanalysis (1939) set out that case, and Self-Analysis (1942) asked how far a patient could get alone. The position cost her the New York Psychoanalytic Institute, which she left in 1941 with Clara Thompson and others to found the Association for the Advancement of Psychoanalysis, the American Institute for Psychoanalysis, and the journal The American Journal of Psychoanalysis. Our Inner Conflicts (1945) had described three broad ways a neurotic person tries to manage other people: moving toward them, moving against them, and moving away from them.

Neurosis and Human Growth returns to those three positions, now presented as "solutions" a person settles into, and supplies the theory of the self they rest on. Horney wrote the book while serving as dean of the American Institute for Psychoanalysis. In December 1950, the journal Pastoral Psychology printed an article of hers called "The Search for Glory". She died in December 1952, two years after the book appeared.

== The argument of the book ==
=== Self-realization and the real self ===
Horney begins from a contrast rather than a definition. Every person, she holds, has a "real self": a set of potentialities that unfold when the conditions for growth are good enough. Health, on this view, is a direction of movement rather than a fixed state, and she describes it with the image of an acorn that becomes an oak when it has soil to grow in. The idea belongs to the same family as self-actualization. Later commentators treat self-realization as the axis on which the whole book turns.

Growth is blocked by a climate rather than by a single trauma. A child whose surroundings are unreliable, indifferent, or actively harmful cannot take its own feelings as a guide, and develops instead what Horney had earlier called basic anxiety: a sense of being isolated and helpless in a world that may do it harm. Since the child cannot change its environment, it changes itself, and the strategies it adopts are the ones that later harden into neurosis.

=== The pride system ===
The book's distinctive move is to describe what happens next as an act of imagination. The child who cannot be loved for what it is begins to idealize itself, building up an "idealized self" of unlimited powers and virtues, until the gap between that picture and the actual self becomes the organizing fact of the person's life. Horney calls the resulting constellation the pride system and the pursuit of the idealized self the search for glory. The first half of the book sets out its parts:

- Neurotic claims: the unspoken expectation that the world, and other people in particular, owe the idealized self the recognition and treatment it deserves.
- The tyranny of the should: the idealized self experienced as a body of commands about what one must feel, do, and be. The phrase has outlived the book, and it still turns up in clinical writing about conformity and self-punishment.
- Neurotic pride: pride that has lost its object, since it rests on the idealized image rather than on anything the person has done; permanently vulnerable, it takes any criticism as an attack.
- Self-hate: the counterpart of the inflated self. The real self can never match the ideal, so the energy that built the ideal turns against the person. Horney describes a self-contempt that runs from nagging self-accusation to active self-destruction, and a person caught between a "despised self" and an ideal it cannot reach.
- Alienation from the self: the end point of the process, at which a person no longer knows what it feels, wants, or believes, and experiences its own life as something conducted at a distance.

Horney treats pride and self-hate as two faces of one system, not as separate faults, and she insists throughout that the neurotic's suffering is real even where the person's outward competence is high.

=== The three solutions ===
The second half of the book describes the equilibrium a person reaches with the pride system, in the three broad forms Horney had identified earlier. In the expansive solution (moving against people) the person identifies with the idealized self and sets out to master the world; Horney divides this into the narcissistic, the perfectionistic, and the arrogant-vindictive character, of whom the last is treated most fully. In the self-effacing solution (moving toward people) the person identifies with the despised self instead, and wins affection by making itself small, appeasing others, and living through them. In the resignation or detached solution the person withdraws from the contest altogether and takes pride in needing nothing. Horney also analyses the morbid dependency that can form between two people whose solutions complement each other: the arrogant-vindictive partner who needs a worshipper, and the self-effacing partner who needs someone to serve. Such a relationship, she argues, belongs closer to sadomasochism than to love.

Two further chapters carry the analysis out of the clinic and into ordinary life. They examine the neurotic's difficulties in human relationships and at work: the perfectionism, the reluctance to finish, and the fear of exposure that can dog a career.

=== Therapy and theoretical considerations ===
The penultimate chapter describes the "road of psychoanalytic therapy" as Horney practises it. The trouble, she argues, lies in a whole way of being rather than in a single symptom, so the work is slow and cannot be forced. The analyst's task is to help the patient see the pride system for what it is and to re-establish contact with the real self. She stresses that the constructive forces in the patient must be enlisted; exposing the pathology is not enough on its own. The last chapter sets her position beside classical psychoanalysis, putting the pride system and the search for glory against libido theory and the Freudian account of internalized superego prohibitions.

== Reception ==
The book was widely reviewed when it appeared. Among the journals that noticed it were the Journal of the American Medical Association, the American Journal of Psychiatry, the Archives of Neurology and Psychiatry, the American Journal of Psychotherapy, Psychological Bulletin, Social Casework and The Quarterly Review of Biology.

Inside psychoanalysis the book met a hostile response from the classical school, which had already driven Horney out of the New York Psychoanalytic Institute. A later account published by the Association for the Advancement of Psychoanalysis argues that the early reaction was "fervently negative and often offensive" but that her ideas have proved "remarkably prescient". Paris, whose reading of Horney is sympathetic, argues that her mature theory "makes a major contribution to psychological thought — particularly the study of personality — that deserves to be more widely known and applied than it is".

== Influence ==
The book inspired Robert C. Tucker's biographies of Joseph Stalin, whom Tucker describes as a Horneyan neurotic. His Stalin as Revolutionary, 1879–1929 (1973) leaned on Horney's account of the arrogant-vindictive character for its portrait of Stalin.

Horney influenced Bill W., co-founder of Alcoholics Anonymous and inspirer of Neurotics Anonymous. In a letter to another AA member he wrote:

You interest me very much when you talk of Karen Horney. I have the highest admiration of her. That gal's insights have been most helpful to me. Also for the benefit of screwballs like ourselves, it may be that someday we shall devise some common denominator of psychiatry—of course, throwing away their much abused terminology—common denominators which neurotics could use on each other. The idea would be to extend the moral inventory of AA to a deeper level, making it an inventory of psychic damages, reliving in conversation episodes, etc. I suppose someday a Neurotics Anonymous will be formed and will actually do all this.

— Bill W., Letter to Ollie in California, January 4, 1956.

Several of Horney's terms, among them the idealized self, the tyranny of the should, self-hate, and morbid dependency, have stayed in circulation long after the book. They appear as headwords in reference works on personality and individual differences, and her account of the "shoulds" is still applied to the pressures of conformity and to clinical work with self-criticism. In literary criticism, Horney's categories became the basis of a recognised method of character analysis. Paris's "Notes from Underground: A Horneyan Analysis" (1973) is an early example of the approach, which has since been applied to a wide range of fiction.

== Editions ==
- Neurosis and Human Growth: The Struggle Toward Self-Realization. New York: W. W. Norton. 1950. 391 pp. OCLC 1220173 — first edition.
- London: Routledge & Kegan Paul. 1951.
- New York: W. W. Norton (The Norton Library). 1970. ISBN 0-393-00135-0 — paperback.
- New York: W. W. Norton. 1991. ISBN 0-393-30775-1 — reissued with a new foreword.
- Abingdon: Routledge. 2013. ISBN 978-1-136-34129-8. doi:10.4324/9781315010526 — reissue.

== See also ==
- Schizoid personality disorder
- Self-hatred
- True self and false self
