= Fairfax University of America =

Private university in Virginia, US

Fairfax University of America (FXUA)
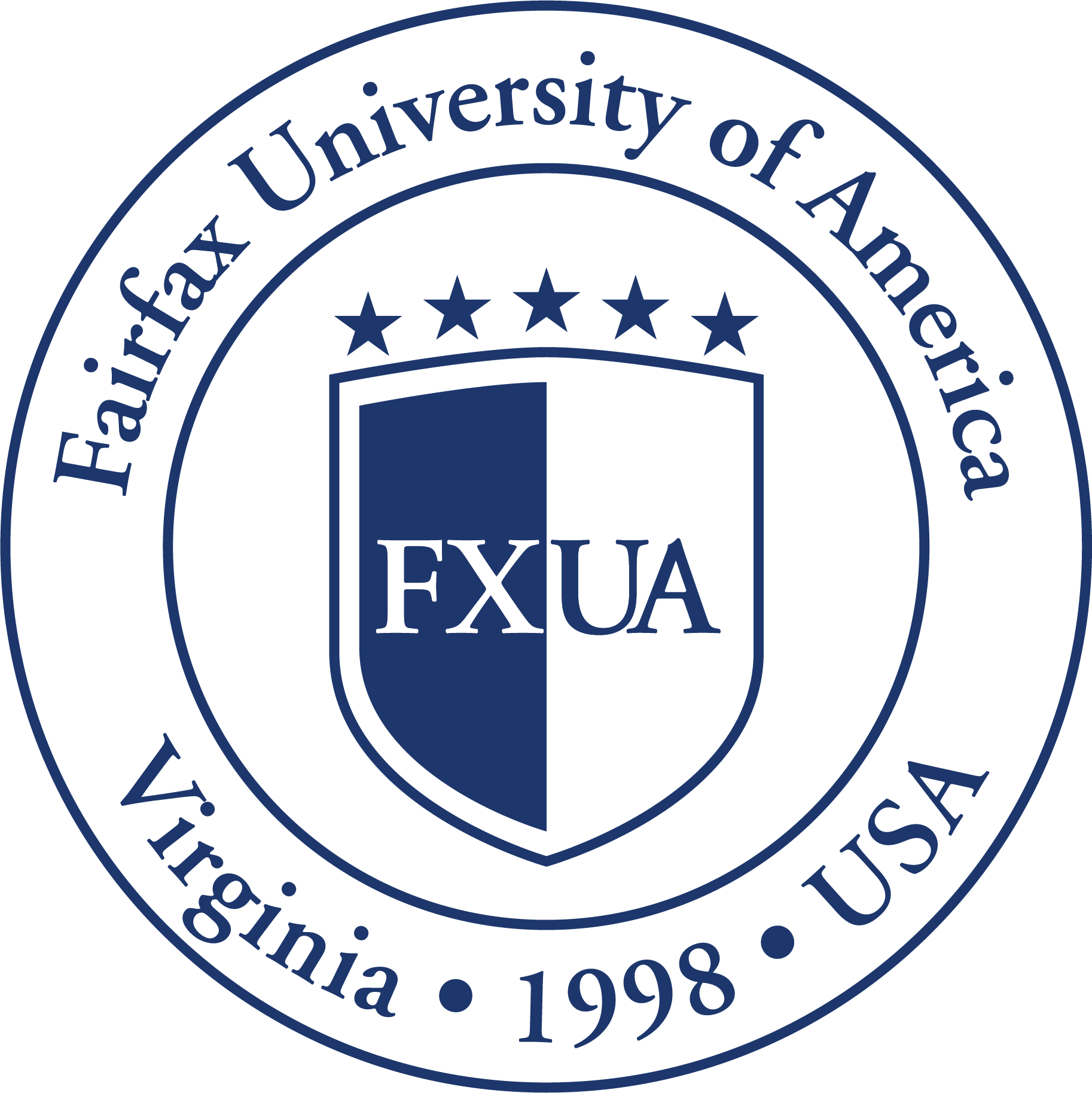
- Type: Private university
- Active: 1998–2024
- President: Ahmed Alwani
- Students: 17 (2021–22)
- Location: Fairfax, Virginia, United States; 38.8496°N 77.3478°W
- Colours: Red and blue
- Mascot: Tiger
- Website: www.fxua.edu
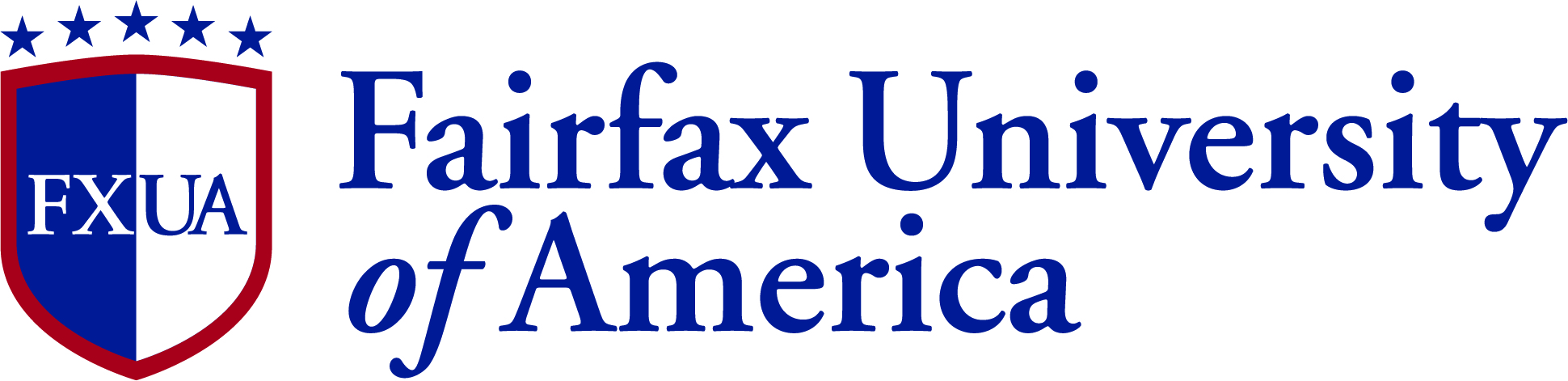

Fairfax University of America (FXUA, formerly Virginia International University) was a private university in Fairfax, Virginia, United States. It was established in 1998, and then as a non-profit 501(c)(3) university in 1999. The university was accredited by the Accrediting Council for Independent Colleges and Schools (ACICS). In 2022 the United States Secretary of Education denied ACICS's accrediting status. The university ceased operations effective December 31, 2024.

== Accreditation and certification ==
ACICS came under heavy scrutiny by regulators for its lax accreditation standards and failure to flag deficient programs at several institutions, including Fairfax University, which was "blasted [for] the quality and rigor of its online education program" by state regulators in 2019 and nearly closed down.

== History ==
The university's website states that the institution was founded in 1998 as Virginia International University. In 1999, the university was incorporated as a non-profit corporation and obtained 501(c)(3) non-profit status. The first commencement was held on May 4, 2006, with 20 graduates in attendance.

In March 2019, the State Council of Higher Education for Virginia threatened to revoke VIU's license to operate in the Commonwealth of Virginia after a 2018 audit found defects in the academic rigor and quality of VIU's online courses, run under Alwani's predecessor, publishing a report that Inside Higher Ed called "scathing". The audit cited several concerns including widespread instances of plagiarism and its admissions policy that allowed international students who demonstrated "abysmally poor" English language skills to attend the university. Although the audit was focused on the school's online courses, auditors suggested that the issues likely impacted face-to-face classes as well, noting that online courses and in-person courses shared common teaching faculty, while the English proficiency issues were common among students attending in-person classes.

In June 2019, the State Council reached an agreement with VIU to allow the college to continue operating on the condition that they pause its distance education for at least three years.

The university's name changed to Fairfax University of America (FXUA) on January 1, 2020.

On December 13, 2021, the State Council completed their audit, finding FXUA to be in full compliance of SCHEV regulations, permitting FXUA to immediately begin offering distance education again.

In 2024, FXUA announced that they would cease operations at the end of the year, citing that the university faced significant challenges due to a complex regulatory environment and a limited timeframe available to secure new accreditation.

== Academics ==
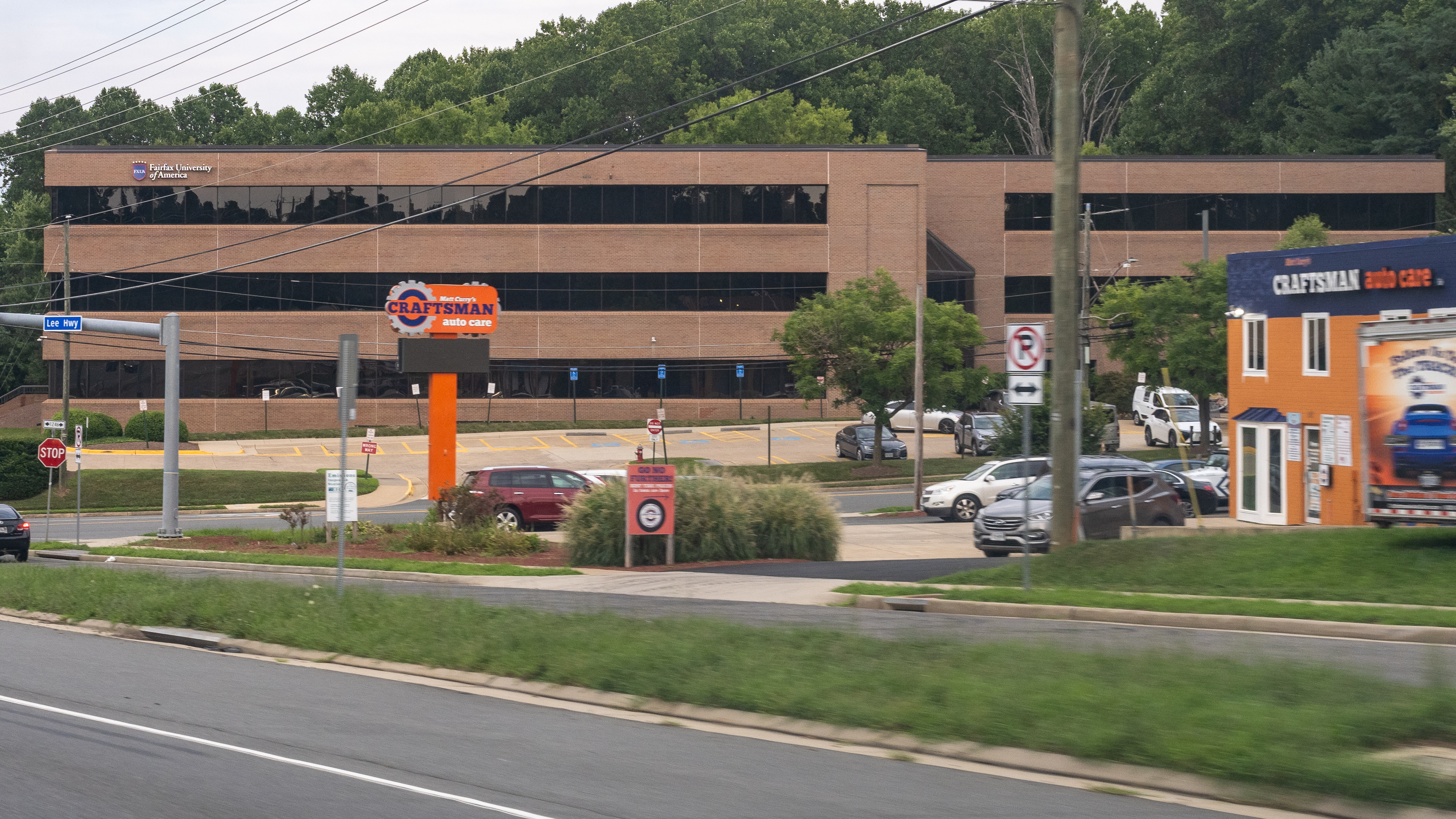
(2024)

The university's academic units were organized into two schools: the School of Business and the School of Computer Information Systems. In Fall 2021 there were 5 full-time instructional faculty and 13 part-time instructional faculty.

=== New Lines Institute for Strategy and Policy ===
Fairfax University of America operated a research institute, founded in 2019, the New Lines Institute for Strategy and Policy, a foreign policy think tank operating out of Washington, D.C. New Lines Institute for Strategy and Policy and New Lines magazine, edited by Hassan Hassan and focusing on the Middle East now operate as independent entities from FXUA. New Lines Institute for Strategy and Policy is licensed in Washington, D.C. as of 2022.

== Student life ==
25 (5 undergraduate) students were enrolled at the university in 2022.
