= Robert C. Tucker =

American political scientist and historian

Robert Charles Tucker (May 29, 1918 – July 29, 2010) was an American political scientist and historian. Tucker is best remembered as a biographer of Joseph Stalin and as an analyst of the Soviet political system, which he saw as dynamic rather than unchanging.

== Biography ==
Born in Kansas City, Missouri, he was a Sovietologist at Princeton University. He graduated from Harvard College, earning an A.B. magna cum laude in 1939, followed by an A.M. in 1941. He served as an attaché at the American Embassy in Moscow from 1944–1953. He received his PhD degree from Harvard University in 1958; his doctoral dissertation was later revised and published as a book. His biographies of Joseph Stalin are cited by the American Association for the Advancement of Slavic Studies as his greatest contribution. At Princeton he started the Russian studies program and held the position of professor of politics emeritus and IBM Professor of International Studies Emeritus until he died.

Tucker was a scholar of Russia and politics. His viewpoints were shaped by nine years (1944–1953) of diplomatic and translation work in wartime and postwar Russia (including persistent efforts to bring his Russian wife to the United States), by wide-ranging interdisciplinary interests in the social sciences and humanities (notably history, psychology, and philosophy), and by creative initiatives to benefit from and contribute to comparative political studies (especially theories of political culture and leadership).

Tucker married a Russian, Eugenia (Evgeniia) Pestretsova, who eventually emigrated with him and taught Russian for many years at Princeton. His daughter Elizabeth is a senior editor on the radio program Marketplace, American Public Media. Her husband, Tucker's son-in-law Robert English, is Associate Professor of Political Science at the University of Southern California.

== Basic ideas ==
Tucker's Harvard University doctoral dissertation was in philosophy and challenged the dominant interpretations of Soviet and Western theorists. He linked the ideas of the young and mature Karl Marx and emphasized their "moralist," "ethical," and "religious" rather than political, economic, and social "essence". His revised dissertation was published as Philosophy and Myth in Karl Marx (1961) and was followed by a collection of innovative essays on Marxian theories of revolution, modernization, and distributive justice as well as comprehensive anthologies of the writings of Marx, Friedrich Engels, and Vladimir Lenin.

Tucker presented lucidly formulated views on tsarist and Soviet politics. He affirmed that change in Soviet political leadership was even more important than continuity in Russian political culture. He contended that psychological differences were more important than ideological similarities in Soviet leadership politics and that Lenin, Joseph Stalin, Nikita Khrushchev, Leonid Brezhnev, and Mikhail Gorbachev had very different personalities and mentalities. He emphasized that the different psychological make-ups of Russia's top political leaders invariably produced different perceptions of situations and options, which, in turn, periodically altered policymaking and implementation procedures as well as domestic and foreign policies. He argued that systemic changes came not only in October 1917, when the Bolsheviks seized power, and in December 1991, when the Soviet Union collapsed, but also in the mid-1930s, when Lenin's one-party dictatorship was transformed into Stalin's one-man dictatorship, and in the mid-1950s, when oligarchic one-party rule filled the power vacuum created by the dictator's death. He underscored that Soviet and post-Soviet Russia's political development progressed in distinctive stages, which were the products of leading officials' choices among viable options at key junctures. Tucker's main stages were: War Communism (1917–1921), New Economic Policy (1921–1928), Revolution from Above (1928–1937), Neo-Tsarist Autocracy (1937–1953), Thaw (1953–1964), Stagnation (1964–1985), and Perestroika (1985–1991).

=== Stalinism ===
While involuntarily remaining in Stalinist Russia, Tucker was greatly influenced by psychoanalytical theories of neurosis, paranoia, and self-idealization. He recognized such traits in Stalin and hypothesized that "psychological needs," "psychopathological tendencies", and "politicized psychodynamics" were not only core elements of Stalin's "ruling personality", but also of Stalinism as a "system of rule" and Stalinization as the process of establishing that rule—"Neo-Tsarist Autocracy".

I hold that Stalinism must be recognized as an historically distinct and specific phenomenon which did not flow directly from Leninism, although Leninism was an important contributory factor. ... Stalinism, despite conservative, reactionary, or counter-revolutionary elements in its makeup, was a revolutionary phenomenon in essence; ... Stalinist revolution from above, whatever the contingencies involved in its inception and pattern, was an integral phase of the Russian revolutionary process as a whole; ... notable among the causal factors explaining why the Stalinist revolution occurred, or why it took the form it did, are the heritage of Bolshevik revolutionism, the heritage of old Russia, and the mind and personality of Stalin.

These themes were developed from comparative, theoretical, and interdisciplinary perspectives and were documented at length in Tucker's magnum opus, the two published volumes of an unfinished three-volume biography of Stalin, and in other important works on Stalin and Stalinism.

Tucker rejected the view that Stalinism was an "unavoidable," "ineluctable," or "necessary" product of Leninism. He highlighted the similarities between tsarist and Stalinist nationalism and patrimonialism, as well as the warlike brutality of the "Revolution from Above" in the 1930s. The chief causes of this revolution were Stalin's voracious appetite for personal, political, and national power and his relentless quest for personal, political, and national security. The chief consequences were the consolidation of Stalin's personal dictatorship, the creation of a military-industrial complex, and the collectivization and urbanization of the peasantry. And the chief means of achieving these ends included blood purges of party and state elites, centralized economic management and slave labor camps, and genocidal famine in Ukraine and Kazakhstan.

Stalin's irrational premonitions, trepidations, and aggressions—intermixed with his rational perceptions, predispositions, and calculations—decisively influenced Soviet domestic politics and foreign policies during and after World War II. Of particular significance were Stalin's forced resettlement of entire non-Russian nationality groups, skillful negotiations with wartime allies, atomic espionage, reimposition of harsh controls in postwar Russia, imposition of Soviet rule in Eastern Europe, and Cold War military-industrial, geopolitical, and ideological rivalry with the United States.

=== De-Stalinization ===
When Stalin died in 1953, Tucker experienced "intense elation" for personal and political reasons. His wife, Evgenia Pestretsova, was soon granted a visa to the United States (and his mother-in-law joined them a half-decade later after a face-to-face request to Khrushchev). Tucker saw a gradually, albeit fitfully, liberalizing Soviet polity, economy, and society and an improving Soviet-American relations (with prospects for much less conflict and much more cooperation).

For Tucker, Stalin's demise posed the question "What shall take the place of Stalinism as a mode of rule and pattern of policy and ideas"? The central issues in Soviet politics were the "desirability, forms, limits, and tempo" of de-Stalinization.

As Tucker detailed in The Soviet Political Mind (1963 and 1971, rev. ed.) and Political Culture and Leadership in Soviet Russia (1987), Stalin's successors did not consensually craft a post-Stalinist political system. An oligarchic system emerged as the byproduct of struggle over power and policy among reformist and "conservative" party and state leaders, whose factions and coalitions increasingly sought the support of subnational party and state officials. Forswearing the use of violence to resolve intraparty disputes and outmaneuvering rivals in bureaucratic infighting, Khrushchev revitalized the party and reasserted its leading role vis-à-vis the state bureaucracies. But his international and domestic "hare-brained schemes"—above all, the Cuban Missile Crisis—led to his ouster by Brezhnev's "collective leadership", whose costly and prolonged military buildup helped to produce (in Tucker's apt words) "a swollen state" and "a spent society".

Gorbachev made glasnost, perestroika, and democratization the centerpieces of a revolutionary ideology, which sparked a divisive public debate about the political content and policy implications of these concepts. More revolutionary, in the late 1980s, Gorbachev discarded the "Brezhnev doctrine", withdrawing Soviet troops from Afghanistan and allowing East European countries in the Soviet bloc to choose their own types of political system. And, most revolutionary, from late 1990 to late 1991, Gorbachev unintentionally and Boris Yeltsin intentionally spurred the disintegration of the Soviet Union, enabling the fifteen union republics to develop their own types of nation-state. Gorbachev at the time was the indirectly elected president of the Soviet Union, and Yeltsin was the directly elected president of the Russian Soviet Federative Socialist Republic, by far the largest and most important union republic. The rivalry between Gorbachev and Yeltsin unequivocally confirmed Tucker's contention that the personalities and mentalities of top Soviet leaders could clash viscerally and vindictively. Tucker had long insisted that intraparty conflict was a catalyst of change in both Soviet policymaking procedures and substantive policies. He observed in 1957: "Probably the most important single failing of Soviet studies in the West has been a general tendency to take pretty much at face value the Communist pretension to a 'monolithic' system of politics. ... Not monolithic unity but the fiction of it prevails in Soviet politics. The ruling party has rarely if ever been the disciplined phalanx pictured by its image-makers, and Lenin's well-known Resolution on Party Unity of 1921 has largely been honored in the breach".

Tucker was keenly aware that Soviet ideology could divide or unify leading party officials and could weaken or strengthen party discipline.

During the Gorbachev years, a reformist official ideology clashed with a conservative operational ideology, and this conflict fractured the party. In 1987, Tucker affirmed: '"Marxism-Leninism' is not at present a rigidly defined set of dogma that allows no scope for differences of interpretation on matters of importance, as it was earlier on. Gorbachev is propounding his own version of it while recognizing—and deploring—that far from all his party comrades share it". Indeed, freer expression of aspirations and grievances destabilized as well as de-Stalinized state-society relations and disintegrated as well as democratized the Soviet polity and society.

=== "Dual Russia" ===
Tucker coined the concept of "dual Russia". This concept focuses attention on the psychological rift between the Russian state and society and on the "we-they" mentality of Russia's coercive elites and coerced masses. "The relation between the state and the society is seen as one between conqueror and conquered". Tucker stressed that this "evaluative attitude" was embraced and reinforced by the most violent and impatient state-building and social-engineering tsars, especially Ivan the Terrible and Peter the Great. Tucker also stressed that Alexander II tried to narrow the gulf between the "two Russias", but his "liberalizing reform from above coincided with the rise of an organized revolutionary movement from below". Indeed, expectations and assessments of "dual Russia" seem to have greatly influenced the decisions and actions of tsars and commissars, revolutionaries and bureaucrats, and ordinary citizens of Russian and non-Russian ethnicity.

Tucker underscored that most tsars and tsarist officials viewed state-society relations as hostile, and that most of the huge serf peasantry, small urban proletariat, and tiny educated stratum had similarly hostile views. But Tucker did not observe a stable or complementary relationship between authoritarian Russian elites and obeisant Russian masses. Instead, he saw mounting pressures from social units and networks for an "unbinding" of the state's control of society. Tucker's illiterate serf and literate proletarian view the tsarist state as "an abstract entity" and "an alien power". His collective farmer resents enserfment and his factory worker resents exploitation in Stalin's "socialist" revolution. And his post-Stalin democratic dissident and liberal intellectual actively and passively reject "dual Russia".

Tucker used the concept of "dual Russia" to elucidate a very important component of de-Stalinization:

The [Khrushchev] regime, it would appear, looks to a rise in the material standard of consumption as a means of reconciling the Russian people to unfreedom in perpetuity. But it is doubtful that a policy of reform operating within these narrow limits can repair the rupture between the state and society that is reflected in the revival of the image of a dual Russia. A moral renovation of the national life, a fundamental reordering of relations, a process of genuine "unbinding," or, in other words, an alternation in the nature of the system, would be needed.

In short, Tucker viewed "dual Russia" as a core element of the tsarist, Soviet, and post-Soviet political systems, and he affirmed that systemic change must be founded on spiritual healing of state-society relations.

=== Political culture ===
Tucker distinguished between "real" and "ideal" culture and between "macro-level" and "micro-level" culture. "Real" cultural patterns consist of "prevalent practices in a society"; "ideal" patterns consist of "accepted norms, values, and beliefs". A "macro-level" culture is a society's "complex totality of patterns and sub-patterns" of traditions and orientations; "micro-level" cultural elements are "individual patterns and clusters of them". Cultural patterns are "ingrained by custom in the conduct and thoughtways of large numbers of people". More like an anthropologist than a political scientist, Tucker included behavior as well as values, attitudes, and beliefs in his concept of culture.

Tucker affirmed that "a strength of the concept of political culture as an analytic tool (in comparison with such macro concepts as modernization and development) is its micro/macro [and real/ideal] character". He studied these four characteristics individually and in various juxtapositions, configurations, and interactions. And he hypothesized that different components of political culture "can have differing fates in times of radical change", especially in revolutionary transitions from one type of political system to another and from one stage of political development to another.

Tucker corroborated this hypothesis with evidence from the Soviet Union. In 1987, he affirmed: "The pattern of thinking one thing in private and being conformist in public will not vanish or radically change simply because glasnost has come into currency as a watchword of policy. Changing the pattern will take time and effort and, above all, some risk-taking openness in action by citizens who speak up ... [and] forsake the pattern of pretence which for so long has governed public life in their country." In 1993, he elaborated: "Although communism as a belief system ... is dying out [in post-Soviet Russia], very many of the real culture patterns of the Soviet period, including that very "'bureaucratism' that made a comeback after the revolutionary break in 1917, are still tenaciously holding on." And, in 1995, he added: "The banning of the CPSU, the elimination of communism as a state creed, and the breakup of the USSR as an imperial formation marked in a deep sense the ending of the Soviet era. But in part because of the abruptness with which these events came about, much of the statist Soviet system and political culture survived into the 1990s."

As Tucker saw it, the "ideal" and "macro" political cultures of the Communist party collapsed with the Soviet Union, but the "real" and "micro" political cultures of tsarist and Soviet Russia adapted to the emerging governmental, commercial, legal, and moral cultures of post-Soviet Russia. He underscored the impact of tsarist political culture on Soviet political culture and, in turn, their combined impact on post-Soviet political culture. Tucker was not a historical determinist, but he observed that centuries-old statism was alive and well in Russia after the breakup of the Soviet Union.

=== Authoritarian political systems ===
Tucker coined the concept of "the revolutionary mass-movement regime under single-party auspices," which he viewed as a general type of authoritarian regime with communist, fascist, and nationalist variants. Tucker's purpose was to stimulate both cross-national and cross-temporal comparisons of authoritarian political systems and social movements. He hypothesized that Soviet Russian history is "one of different movements and of different Soviet regimes within a framework of continuity of organizational forms and official nomenclature".

Tucker put emphasis on the top Soviet leader's mental health and its ramifications for political change and continuity. The psychological or psychopathological needs and wants of a movement-regime's leader are "the driving force of the political mechanism," and the movement-regime is "a highly complicated instrumentality" for expressing the leader's primal emotions in political behavior. Stalin's self-glorification, lust for power, megalomania, paranoia, and cruelty are viewed as integral components of Stalinist "real culture," operative ideology, "dictatorial decision making", domestic and foreign policies, policy implementation and resistance, and state penetration and domination of society. Tucker sought not only to describe and document Stalin's motives and beliefs, but also to explain their psychological origins, interactive development, and tangible consequences for Stalin individually and for Stalinist rule.

Tucker's focus on the diverse mind-sets and skill-sets of Soviet leaders supported his early critique of the totalitarian model, which he faulted for paying insufficient attention to the institutionalized pathologies and idiosyncrasies of autocrats and oligarchs. Tucker also criticized the totalitarian model for downplaying the conflicts and cleavages, inefficiencies and incompatibilities, and "departmentalism" and "localism" in purportedly "monolithic" and "monopolistic" regimes. He noted that an autocrat's top lieutenants often were bitter rivals, rank-and-file party officials often withheld negative information from their superiors, and "family groups" or "clans" often resisted state controls in informal and ingenious ways.

Having lived and worked in Stalin's Russia for nine years, Tucker had rich experiential knowledge and instinctive comprehension of everyday life in the USSR, which included family, friends, favors, work, and bureaucracy as well as fear, deprivation, persecution, surveillance, and hypocrisy. He could feel as well as analyze the similarities and differences between the realities and ideals of Soviet totalitarianism. And, because the totalitarian model was the dominant cross-national component of Sovietology, Tucker called for more and better comparative analysis of Soviet politics and for mutually beneficial ties with mainstream political science. He rejected the "theoretical isolationism" of Sovietology and its widely held presupposition that Soviet politics was "a unique subject matter".

=== Political leadership ===
Tucker compared Soviet and tsarist Russian political leaders, as well as various types of political leadership in various contexts. In Politics as Leadership (1981), he argued that leadership is "the essence of politics". He analyzed the diagnostic, prescriptive, and mobilizing functions of leadership. He surveyed "the process of political leadership," "leadership through social movements," and "leadership and the human situation". He underscored that a leader's definition of a situation could be self-fulfilling and must be communicated effectively to different audiences. And he elaborated on the key sociopsychological maxim that "situations defined as real are real in their consequences":

The political process is influenced by many a material factor, but it has its prime locus in the mind. Not only is it a mental process when leaders learn about and analyze the causes of circumstances that have arisen, when they interpret the circumstances' meaning in relation to various concerns, when they define the problem situation for their political communities and decide on what seems the proper prescription for collective action. Mental processes are also pivotally involved—now in the minds of followers or potential followers—when leadership appeals for positive response to its policy prescription.

Tucker contrasted constitutional and nonconstitutional states, especially their respective political cultures and leadership prerogatives:

What distinguishes constitutional forms of statehood ... is that no one, be it a ruling person, a government in power or a ruling party, may act on the principle L'Etat, c'est moi [I am the state]. For the state is the body of citizens, together with the collectively self-accepted system of laws by which they are governed and which center in the constitution. ... The result is a disjunction between loyalty to the state and agreement with the policies of a particular government in power or acceptance of that government as a desirable one for the nation. ... That, it seems, is the essence of constitutionalism as a political culture; open plurality of political groups or parties is an institutional derivative of this disjunction. Where constitutionalism does not exist, even though a constitutional charter may have been formally proclaimed, the authorities treat disagreement with the given government's or ruling party's policies, or disapproval of the government itself, as disloyalty to the state. In effect, they say: L'Etat, c'est nous [We are the state].

Briefly stated, Tucker stressed the importance of political leadership. He contended that the psychological characteristics of autocrats varied greatly, as did their personal and policy priorities and their policymaking and administrative capabilities. He affirmed that oligarchs perceived opportunities and liabilities in diverse ways and often struggled over power and policy, especially at historical turning points with viable options. An avid scholar of Russian history, Tucker scrutinized the interaction between the tsarist autocracy and the revolutionary movement. He emphasized the Russian rather than the Marxian roots of Bolshevism. He highlighted the differences between Lenin's one-party dictatorship and Stalin's one-man dictatorship. He illuminated the similarities between tsarist and Stalinist state-building and social engineering. He elucidated the domestic and international politics of de-Stalinization in Soviet and post-Soviet Russia. And he argued that the animosities, anxieties, and incompatibilities of the "two Russias" weakened the legitimacy, efficacy, and stability of tsarist, communist, and post-communist regimes.

=== Communist studies and the social sciences ===
What younger generations of comparativists in political science may not know is that Tucker was at the forefront of efforts to bring the comparative study of communist systems into the discipline of political science and the field of comparative politics. In 1969, he assumed chairmanship of the Planning Group on Comparative Communist Studies sponsored by the American Council of Learned Societies under a grant from the Carnegie Corporation. During his six-year tenure as chair, the Planning Group convened a number of international conferences that shed new light on the similarities and differences among communist regimes. The proceedings of these conferences were reported to the profession through the publication of several conference volumes. Tucker's tenure as chair also saw the expansion of the Planning Group's Newsletter on Comparative Studies of Communism, which presented shorter discussion pieces on the subject of its masthead.

The intellectual tone for much of the work of the Planning Group under Tucker's leadership was set by his paper "Culture, Political Culture, and Soviet Studies," written for a 1971 conference on Communist Political Culture convened at Arden House in Harriman, New York. Subsequently, published in Political Science Quarterly (1973) and as the opening chapter in his book Political Culture and Leadership in Soviet Russia (1987), that paper set forth the hypothesis that "if Communism in practice tends to be an amalgam of an innovated cultural system [Marxism] and elements of a national cultural ethos, then divergences of national cultural ethos will be one of the factors making for developmental diversity and cultural tension between different [Marxist] movements". Subsequent conferences of the Planning Group explored the extent of those divergences and developmental diversities, including a third element in the amalgam that Tucker had overlooked—components of imported foreign culture, including technology—but to which he was quite receptive.

Although perhaps best known for his seminal trilogy on Stalin (the third volume of which remained unfinished at the time of his death), the corpus of Tucker's scholarly work was significant, among other reasons, for moving communism studies and particularly Soviet studies away from narrow area studies and helping to place them within the parameters of political science and the social sciences. His desire to move Soviet studies in that direction can be found in one of his earliest works—on the first page of an article entitled "Towards a Comparative Politics of Movement Regimes," published in The American Political Science Review (1961). This article was reprinted in an important collection of Tucker's early essays—The Soviet Political Mind (1963; rev. ed. 1971) — that included such important essays as "The Image of Dual Russia" — a classic piece that is still assigned in graduate and undergraduate courses on Soviet and Russian politics.

Tucker's highly regarded work on Stalin drew on the theories of psychologist Karen Horney, providing insights into the feared (and still revered by some in Russia) Soviet leader and demonstrating the significance of psychological theories for understanding political leadership. Rather than merely describing Stalin's cruelty, paranoia, and mental quirks, Tucker was more concerned with explaining Stalin's psychological make-up. And that is where Horney's theories proved invaluable to him. He found in Horney's work the study of "neurotic character structure," which included such attributes as the "search for glory" and a "need for vindictive triumph". It was Horney's 1950 book Neurosis and Human Growth that particularly inspired him while serving on the staff of the American Embassy in Moscow at the time. A half century later, he was quite candid in acknowledging the role of that work in the development of his own thinking: "Instead of dealing in such abstract categories from a book of psychology, I was now using that book as guidance in a biographer's effort to portray his subject as an individual".

Notwithstanding his "intellectual fascination with [Horney's] unusual hypothesis," Tucker in the end confessed that his biography of Stalin "never became —fortunately— the political-science tract that it started out to be". He was quick to add, however, that "neither did it become a conventional biography of a historically influential person". While this may indicate growing frustration at his own attempts to marry Soviet studies and the social sciences, he nevertheless remained sympathetic to and supportive of such attempts by his own students and colleagues.

Tucker's interest in political leadership was by no means confined to Stalin. Indeed, he addressed the subject of political leadership in a much broader context in his 1981 book Politics as Leadership, in which he viewed politics as leadership rather than as power. Such an approach, Tucker argued, was more useful to students of society, since it was more comprehensive and could open up more areas to political analysis than could the more orthodox view of politics as power. In his preface to the 1995 revised edition of the book, Tucker restated two fundamental propositions that had guided his inquiries into political leadership: (1) "political leadership often makes a crucial difference in the lives of states and other human communities"; and (2) "leadership—although the term itself has a positive resonance—can be a malignant force in human affairs as well as a force for good." His collected works clearly demonstrated the veracity of both propositions.

== Works ==
- Tucker, Robert C. (1961). Philosophy and Myth in Karl Marx. Cambridge, England: Cambridge University Press. ISBN 0-7658-0644-4.
- Tucker, Robert C. (1971) [1963]. The Soviet Political Mind: Stalinism and Post-Stalin Change (Rev. ed.). New York: Norton. ISBN 0-393-00582-8.
- Tucker, Robert C.; Cohen, Stephen F., eds. (1965). The Great Purge Trial. New York: Grosset & Dunlap. LCCN 65-14751.
- Tucker, Robert C. (1969). The Marxian Revolutionary Idea. New York: Norton. ISBN 0-393-00539-9.
- Marx, Karl; Engels, Friedrich (1972). Tucker, Robert C. (ed.). The Marx-Engels Reader. New York: Norton. ISBN 0-393-09040-X.
- Lenin, Vladimir (1977). Tucker, Robert C. (ed.). The Lenin Anthology. New York: Norton. ISBN 0-393-09236-4.
- Tucker, Robert C., ed. (1977). Stalinism: Essays in Historical Interpretation. New York: W. W. Norton & Company. ISBN 0-8133-2491-2.
- Tucker, Robert C. (1987). Political Culture and Leadership in Soviet Russia. New York: W. W. Norton & Company. ISBN 0-393-95798-5.
- Tucker, Robert C. (1988). Stalin as Revolutionary: 1879-1929. New York: W. W. Norton & Company. ISBN 0-393-00738-3.
- Tucker, Robert C. (1990). Stalin in Power: The Revolution from Above, 1928-1941. New York: W. W. Norton & Company. ISBN 0-393-02881-X.
- Tucker, Robert C. (1995) [1981]. Politics as Leadership (Rev. ed.). Columbia, Mo: University of Missouri Press. ISBN 0-8262-1023-6.
- Tucker, Robert C.; Colton, Timothy J., eds. (1995). Patterns in Post-Soviet Leadership. Boulder CO: Westview Press. ISBN 0-8133-2492-0.

== See also ==
- Enemy complex, a phrase used by Tucker
