= Vladimir Kojève =

Russian major-general

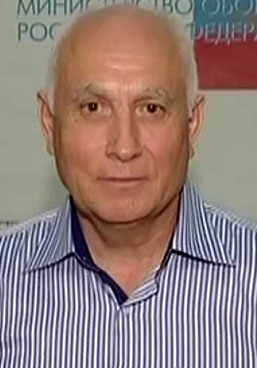
- Born: 3 July 1952 (age 74); Soviet Union

Vladimir Kojève, or Khodzhev (born 1952) – was a Russian major-general who acted as a military advisor to the government of Syria. He was allegedly killed in the Syrian civil war. In October 2012, after his death, personal documents were published by Al Arabiya which suggested he was working as part of a contract under which the Russian government provided security assistance to the Assad regime; documents suggested he had access to all security facilities in Syria.

However, Now Lebanon cast doubt on the authenticity of Al Arabiya's story. Kuzheyev had earlier appeared on television, in August 2012, to deny reports of his death.
