= Michael Weiss (journalist) =

American journalist and author

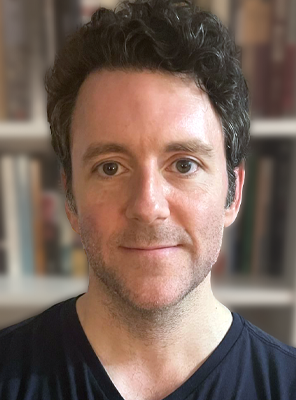
- Investigative journalist Michael Weiss, 2024
- Born: New York City, U.S.
- Education: Dartmouth College (BA)
- Occupations: Journalist, analyst, investigative reporter, author, podcaster
- Employer(s): The Insider; Yahoo News; New Lines Magazine; Free Russia Foundation
- Known for: Author, ISIS: Inside the Army of Terror; Security analyst, CNN; Senior editor, The Daily Beast; Editor-in chief, interpreter (online magazine)
- Website: michaelweissjournalist.com

Michael D. Weiss is an American journalist, author, and news commentator. He specializes in international affairs, in particular the Middle East and Russia. He is a contributing editor at New Lines magazine, a senior correspondent for Yahoo News, and editor of The Insider. He is a regular network guest on several CNN shows. He is also director of special investigations at the Free Russia Foundation.

Weiss rose to prominence in 2015 with the publication of the New York Times bestseller ISIS: Inside the Army of Terror, co-written with Hassan Hassan. He is a former investigative reporter at CNN, and has also written for numerous other publications that include The Daily Telegraph, Foreign Affairs, The Wall Street Journal, The Guardian, Slate, The Weekly Standard, and The New Republic. He was a columnist for Foreign Policy magazine, The Daily Beast, and NOW Lebanon.

== Background ==
Weiss is a 1998 graduate of Townsend Harris High School, a public magnet high school in Flushing, Queens in New York City. He then went to Dartmouth College where he obtained a B.A. degree in History in 2002.

== Career ==
=== Journalism ===
Weiss spent his early career as a war reporter covering the Syrian revolution for news publications including The Daily Telegraph, Foreign Affairs, and Foreign Policy. He was on the ground in Aleppo in 2012, just days after the city fell to the rebels.

In 2013, Weiss launched The Interpreter, an online magazine that translates and analyzes Russian media. He has been its editor-in chief since launch.

Weiss worked as a contributing editor at The Daily Beast until 2017, where he focused on world affairs and culture.

He started contributing to CNN in 2015, and joined the network full time in April 2017 as an investigative reporter for international affairs.

Weiss was part of the team that launched New Lines Magazine, an international affairs magazine, in October 2020. He is a contributing editor for the magazine.

Weiss currently serves as the editor-in-chief of the English edition of The Insider, which specializes in Russia related investigative journalism, fact-checking, and political analytics. A 2024 investigation into Havana syndrome, conducted by The Insider in collaboration with the U.S. network CBS and the German news magazine Der Spiegel, led to senators calling for the case to be reopened in a joint letter to U.S. President Joe Biden.

Working frequently in collaboration with international outlets such as Der Spiegel, Le Monde, Delfi and Re:Baltica, Weiss has led several high-profile exposés into Russian intelligence operations and political interference:

In early 2024 Weiss co-authored a joint investigation with Delfi Estonia, Re:Baltica, and Expressen revealing that Tatjana Ždanoka, a long-serving Latvian Member of the European Parliament, had been an operative for the Russian Federal Security Service (FSB) for at least two decades.

Weiss's reporting has examined alleged Kremlin influence over European far-right parties. This includes investigations into Lega Nord in Italy, reporting on claims that Russian officials were involved in a proposed scheme to provide funding to the party via an oil deal, and similar reporting on alleged influence operations involving Alternative for Germany (AfD), including claims that an AfD-linked parliamentary aide had connections to Russia's Federal Security Service.

In 2024 Weiss co-led an investigation that identified fugitive Wirecard COO Jan Marsalek as an alleged long-term asset of Russia's GRU, reporting that he had been managed by Russian intelligence for over a decade before fleeing to Moscow.

Weiss's work has also examined the activities of Russia's GRU Unit 29155, including reporting on the unmasking of Nikolai and Elena Shaposhnikov, a husband-and-wife team of "illegal" spies in the Czech Republic, who were alleged to have assisted the unit in operations linked to the 2014 Vrbětice ammunition depot explosions.

Weiss's reporting has examined alleged Russian military intelligence activities abroad, including claims that Russia's GRU offered bounties to the Taliban to target U.S. forces in Afghanistan, as well as reporting on the recruitment of foreign mercenaries from Latin America and Serbia to support Russian military operations in Ukraine.

He was a senior correspondent for Yahoo News. He has also written for a number of other publications, including The Wall Street Journal, The Guardian, Slate, The Weekly Standard, The New Republic and The Atlantic, among others.

=== Media commentary ===
Weiss is a regular guest on network TV, including on Wolf Blitzer’s The Situation Room, Anderson Cooper 360°, and CNN Tonight with Don Lemon. He has also appeared on The Last Word with Lawrence O’Donnell, Hardball with Chris Matthews, Morning Joe, Way Too Early, and Ronan Farrow Daily on MSNBC; Newsday on BBC World News; and Kennedy, America's Newshour, and The O’Reilly Factor on Fox News, as well as on Charlie Rose and Real Time with Bill Maher.

He also used to write regular columns with Foreign Policy, The Daily Beast and Beirut-based Lebanese news website NOW Lebanon.

In 2010, in a commentary piece for the Weekly Standard, Weiss criticized British Prime Minister David Cameron after Cameron, during a speech delivered in Ankara, referred to Gaza as a "prison camp". Weiss wrote that Turkish Prime Minister Recep Tayyip Erdoğan "is the man whom David Cameron was out to please ... Brutal occupation of Cyprus, subjugation of a Kurdish minority in everything from politics to linguistics, and ongoing denial of the Armenian genocide are evidently Maastricht-compatible initiatives to the new British prime minister".

In March 2015, in a commentary piece cowritten with U.S. army intelligence officer Michael Pregent for the international affairs journal Foreign Policy, Weiss accused Iran-backed Iraqi Shia militias of committing extensive atrocities against Sunni civilians in the course of their war against the Islamic State of Iraq and the Levant. According to these reports, Weiss wrote, the militias were "burning people alive in their houses, playing soccer with severed human heads, and ethnically cleansing and razing whole villages to the ground."

In 2016 Weiss interviewed Lithuanian President Dalia Grybauskaitė for The Daily Beast, about her claim that Russia was a terrorist state. The interview focused on Russia's involvement in the Baltic, and allegations of corruption.

=== Think tanks ===
In 2012 Weiss served as co-chair of the Russia Studies Centre at the trans-Atlantic foreign policy think tank Henry Jackson Society.

In 2016 he was a Nonresident Senior Fellow at the Atlantic Council’s Brent Scowcroft Center for Strategy and Security.

Weiss is a director of special investigations at the Free Russia Foundation, where he oversees a project called the Lubyanka Files, intended to translate KGB training manuals still being used to train Russian spies.

=== Congress ===
In December 2015 Weiss gave evidence to the U.S. Congress following the Islamist attacks on Paris on 13 November 2015. His testimony sought to address the question of whether the attacks signalled a change in strategy by ISIS.

== Publications ==
=== Books ===
In 2015 Weiss co-wrote a book with Hassan Hassan on the rise of the militant group ISIS, titled ISIS: Inside the Army of Terror. The book was chosen by The Wall Street Journal as one of 10 must-read works on the evolution of terrorism in the Middle East, one of the London Times' Best Books of 2015, and The New York Times Editors' Choice in April 2015. The book was reviewed favorably twice in The New York Times, The Guardian, and The Wall Street Journal. The Times' chief book critic, Michiko Kakutani, said the book gave readers "a fine-grained look at the organization’s evolution through assorted incarnations." It has been translated into over a dozen languages.

Weiss is reportedly writing a book about the GRU, Russia's military intelligence agency.

=== The Interpreter ===
In 2013 Weiss launched online magazine The Interpreter, under the auspices of the Institute of Modern Russia and the Herzen Foundation. The magazine describes itself as "a daily translation and analysis journal covering the actions and policies of the Russian government in both foreign and domestic spheres."

Weiss is editor-in-chief of the magazine. He has also authored several reports under its name.

One special report, published in 2014 with co-author Peter Pomerantsev, was titled "The Menace of Unreality: How the Kremlin Weaponizes Information, Culture and Money." The report accused Russia of waging "propaganda and disinformation" campaigns, and was cited as evidence in a BBC News investigation on the matter. It included recommendations on how to confront Russian propaganda which included creating an "internationally recognized ratings system for disinformation." The recommendations were criticized in an article written by James Carden – executive director of the lobbying organization American Committee for East–West Accord – in The Nation as a "censorship campaign."

Another report, published in 2015, was titled "An Invasion by Any Other Name: The Kremlin’s Dirty War in Ukraine." It was co-authored with James Miller, Pierre Vaux, and Catherine A. Fitzpatrick. The report confirmed Russia's presence on the ground in eastern Ukraine. It was commended by former U.S. diplomat John E. Herbst, who authored the foreword.

=== Podcasts ===
Weiss hosts Foreign Office with Michael Weiss, a podcast on intelligence and international security.

== Accolades ==
Weiss was nominated for an investigative reporting award at the European Press Prize in 2020, along with a number of collaborators. The nomination was for "Master and Chef," a report that proved Russia's involvement in the Libyan civil war.

He was described in 2017 by a CNN executive editor as having "deep knowledge and an extensive source network in two key areas of focus right now: The Middle East and Russia."

In 2025 he was appointed a Commander (3rd Class) of the Order of the Cross of Terra Mariana by President Alar Karis, Estonia’s highest honour for foreign nationals.

== Personal life ==
He is married to Amy Thirjung.
