= Dorothy Evans Holmes =

American psychoanalytic thinker (born 1943)

- Born: 1943 (age 82–83); Illinois, United States
- Education: Southern Illinois University (PhD); Case Western Reserve University; University of Rochester
- Known for: Work on culturally-imposed trauma and the intersections of race, class and gender
- Awards: Sigourney Award (2022)
- Scientific career
- Fields: Psychoanalytic theory
- Workplaces: University of Maryland, College Park; Howard University; George Washington University; The International Journal of Psychoanalysis; The Journal of the American Psychoanalytic Association; Psychoanalytic Education Center of the Carolinas

Dorothy Evans Holmes (born 1943) is an American psychoanalytic thinker, psychoanalyst and psychotherapist. She is known for her work on racial and cultural trauma.

== Early life and education ==
Holmes was born in 1943 and was raised in Chicago, Illinois, United States. She has a twin sister called Doris.

Holmes studied a PhD in psychology at Southern Illinois University in Carbondale, Illinois and spent a year working as an Intern in Psychiatry at Case Western Reserve University (CWRU) in Cleveland, Ohio, under the supervision of Charles DeLeon. She then completed a two-year psychoanalytical post-doctoral program in Psychiatry at the University of Rochester. She became a member of the Baltimore Washington American Psychoanalytic Association (APsA) Institute.

== Career ==
Between 1970 and 1973, Holmes taught at the University of Maryland, College Park, before teaching at Howard University in Washington, D.C. from 1973 to 1998. She has been a member of the National Register of Health Service Psychologists since 1975. Holmes became Program Director of the Clinical Psychology PsyD Program at the George Washington University (GWU) in 1998, working at GWU until her retirement in 2011.

Holmes is a leading thinker in the field of psychoanalysis on the impact of racial and cultural trauma on mental health. She has criticised the reluctance of traditional psychoanalytic institutions and clinicians to address culturally imposed trauma and recognise the resultant harm. She also put forward the theory that "both analyst and analysand collude in avoiding dealing with race in the transference, because of its links to violent impulses and the deeply embedded cultural racism."

Holmes presented at the 2013 Black Psychoanalysts Speak Conference, and was featured in the documentary made about the conference, Black Psychoanalysts Speak (2014), directed by Basia Winograd. In 2017, Holmes worked as a training and supervising analyst with the Psychoanalytic Education Center of the Carolinas, who offer the Holmes Fellowship in her honour.

In 2020, The Holmes Commission on Racial Equality in American Psychoanalysis (CO-REAP) was established, with support of the American Psychoanalytic Association (APsA), to study systemic racism in American psychoanalysis and produce an action plan for recommended changes to the APsA's governance structures, policies and practices. Holmes served as Chairperson of the commission.

Holmes served on the editorial boards of The International Journal of Psychoanalysis and The Journal of the American Psychoanalytic Association. She is also a Trustee on the Board of the Accreditation Council of Psychoanalytic Education.

== Select publications ==
- Holmes, Dorothy Evans. (1992. "Race and transference in psychoanalysis and psychotherapy". The International Journal of Psychoanalysis, 73 (1), pp. 1–11.
- Holmes, Dorothy Evans. (1999). "Race and countertransference: Two “blind spots” in psychoanalytic perception." Journal of Applied Psychoanalytic Studies, 1 (4) pp. 319–332.
- Holmes, Dorothy Evans. (2006). "Success neurosis: what race and social class have to do with it" in Moodley, Roy and Palmer, Stephen (eds.) Race, Culture and Psychotherapy: Critical Perspectives in Multicultural Practice. London: Routledge.
- Holmes, Dorothy Evans. (2016). ""I knew that my mind could take me anywhere": psychoanalytic reflections on the dignity of African Americans living in a racist society" in Levine, Susan S. (ed.) Dignity Matters: Psychoanalytic and Psychosocial Perspectives. London: Routledge.
- Holmes, Dorothy Evans. (2016). "Culturally imposed trauma: The sleeping dog has awakened. Will psychoanalysis take heed?" Psychoanalytic Dialogues, 26 (6), pp. 641–654.
- Holmes, Dorothy Evans. (2016). "Come Hither, American Psychoanalysis: Our Complex Multicultural America Needs What We Have to Offer." Journal of the American Psychoanalytic Association, 64 (3), pp. 568–586.
- Holmes, Dorothy Evans. (2017). "The fierce urgency of now: An appeal to organized psychoanalysis to take a strong stand on race." The American Psychoanalyst, 51 (1). pp. 1–9.
- Holmes, Dorothy Evans/ (2019). "Our Country ‘tis of We and Them: Psychoanalytic Perspectives on our Fractured American Identity" American Imago, 36, pp. 359–379.
- Holmes, Dorothy Evans/ (2021). ""I do not have a racist bone in my body": Psychoanalytic perspectives on what is lost and not mourned in our culture’s persistent racism." Journal of the American Psychoanalytic Association, 69 (2), pp. 237–258.

== Awards ==
- Division 39 Diversity Award (2017)
- Sigourney Award (2022)
