= Extramarital sex =

Sexual activity by a married person with someone other than their spouse

Extramarital sex is sexual activity in which at least one sex partner is a married person and the partners are not married to each other. The term may be distinguished from premarital sex where neither partner is married.

Where extramarital sex does not breach a sexual norm, it may be referred to as consensual non-monogamy (see also polyamory). Where extramarital sex does breach a sexual norm, it may be referred to as adultery or non-monogamy (sexual acts between a married person and a person other than the legal spouse), fornication, bigamy, philandering, or infidelity. These varying terms imply both immoral or religious consequences, charged whether via civil law or religious law.

== Prevalence ==
American researcher Alfred Kinsey found in his 1950-era studies that 50% of American males and 26% of females had extramarital sex, representing an estimated hundred million Americans. Depending on studies, it was estimated that 26–50% of men and 21–38% of women, or 22.7% of men and 11.6% of women had extramarital sex. Other authors say that between 20% and 25% of Americans had sex with someone other than their spouse. Durex's Global Sex Survey (2005) found that 44% of adults worldwide reported having had one-night extramarital sex and 22% had an affair. A 1994 study found that only 2.5% of married Americans in urban areas with large Hispanic or African-American populations had sexual partners outside of marriage. According to a 2004 United States survey, 16% of married partners have had extramarital sex, nearly twice as many men as women, while an additional 30% have fantasized about extramarital sex. A 2016 study by the Institute for Family Studies in the US found that black Protestants had a higher rate of extramarital sex than Catholics. The 2022 General Social Survey found that of Americans engaging in extramarital sex, 50% identified as Protestant and 16% as Catholic.

In India, 0.2% females and 0.98% males did extramarital sex in a year as per the National Family Health Survey - 5, 2019-21.

A 2010 study of eight rural Sub-Saharan African populations reported that rates of risky extramarital sex varied from country to country, from 7% of men in Malawi to 33% of men in Chad.

According to a 2015 study by Durex and Match.com, Thailand and Denmark were the most adulterous countries based on the percentage of adults who admitted having an affair.

A 2018 US study found that 53.5% of Americans who admitted having extramarital sex did so with someone they knew well, such as a close friend. About 29.4% were with someone who was somewhat well-known, such as a neighbor, co-worker or long-term acquaintance, and the rest were with casual acquaintances. The study also found some gender differences, such as that men are more likely than women to hold more favorable attitudes about extramarital sex, and that among those who reported having extramarital sex in the past year, about 12% of men had paid for sex (or to have received payment for sex) compared to 1% for women.

Engagement in extramarital sex has been associated with individuals who have a higher libido (sex drive) than their partner.

== Religious views ==
=== Judaism ===
The Torah prescribes the death penalty through strangulation for adultery, which is defined as sex with or by a female who is already married to another man. The Torah prescribes strict liability and punishment on the male, but liability and punishment on the female only if she was not raped (Leviticus 20:10). As a death penalty offence, two witnesses of good character had to testify in court for the case to be even considered by the judges against either or both the male and female. (Deuteronomy 19:15, and Mishnah Sanhedrin c.4)

Any physical punishments for any offences (sins) were in effect at the times of Judges and the Holy Temple. In rabbinic Judaism, any physical punishment is prohibited by Judaism—as no proper judicial process can be provided until the Holy Temple is rebuilt by the Messiah.

=== Christianity ===
Traditionalist Christianity teaches that extramarital sex is both immoral and sinful by nature. Scriptural foundations for this Biblical teaching are cited as following:

Know ye not that the unrighteous shall not inherit the kingdom of God? Be not deceived: neither fornicators, nor idolaters, nor adulterers, nor effeminate (court eunuchs and homosexuals), nor abusers of themselves with mankind, Nor thieves, nor covetous, nor drunkards, nor revilers, nor extortioners, shall inherit the kingdom of God. — 1 Corinthians 6:9–10 (Latin Vulgate):

Accordingly, a Catholic wedding strictly teaches that a husband and wife publicly promise fidelity to each other until death, which is the sole reason for the dissolution of a Sacramental Marriage. Consequentially, both adultery and divorce contradicts this nuptial promise by breach made to the covenant of Holy Mother Church.

The Order of Waldensians were accused of expressing approval of adultery in certain rare circumstances.

In contrast, some select modernist Protestant denominations, such as the Episcopalians today hold liberal and progressive views on extramarital sex and relations, adhering to their own personal interpretations of the Holy Bible and its relevancy to modern lifestyles.

=== Islam ===
Traditional interpretations of Islamic law (or Sharia) prescribe severe punishments for zina, or extramarital sex, by both men and women. Premarital sex could be punished by up to 100 lashes, while adultery is punishable by stoning. The act of sexual penetration must, however, be attested by at least four male Muslim witnesses of good character, the accused has a right to testify in court, the suspect's word or testimony is required to hold the most weight in the eyes of the judge(s), punishments are reserved to the legal authorities and the law states that false accusations are to be punished severely. The former regulations also make some Muslims believe, that the process's goal was to eventually abolish the physical penalties relating to acts of fornication and adultery that were already present within many societies around the world when Islamic teachings first arose. According to this view, the principles are so rigorous in their search for evidence, that they create the near impossibility of being able to reach a verdict that goes against the suspect in any manner.

=== Hinduism ===
Hinduism condemns extramarital sex as sin. According to the Hindu Dharmashastra texts, any sexual act outside of the accepted marriage, including physical, mental, and emotional adultery, are denounced.

== Law ==
Extramarital sex is legal in most jurisdictions, but laws against adultery are more common. In the United States, for example, Virginia prosecuted John Bushey for adultery in 2004. Other states allow jilted spouses to sue their ex-partners' lovers for alienation of affections.

Extramarital sex is illegal in some Muslim-majority countries, including Saudi Arabia, Pakistan, Afghanistan, Egypt, Iran, Kuwait, Maldives, Morocco, Oman, Mauritania, United Arab Emirates, Qatar, Sudan, and Yemen.

== Attitudes toward extramarital sex ==
A person's attitude towards extramarital sex is associated with their likelihood of engaging in extramarital sex. While some extramarital sex is deceptive, other forms are open and spouses share an understanding of its engagement. Extramarital sex poses a problem to marriage when it violates expectations of fidelity. The theory behind fidelity is thought to be a combination of moral standards and social exchange processes. The latter is based on the investment model of commitment and interdependence theory.

=== Motivations ===
Motivations behind the act of extramarital sex vary. Feelings can be more difficult to control than behavior. People may engage in the act due to feelings of dissatisfaction emotionally/physically in the marriage and imbalance in the relationship resource-wise. The intimacy vs passion argument provides reason such that it can revive passionate arousal. This contrasts to the marriage of the committed partner as they may feel they have them well understood, with little passion between them. However, an opportunity to engage in extramarital sex must also be present, where the risks are weighed less than the reasons to engage.

=== Factors ===
Factors that are negatively associated with a spouse engaging with extramarital sex are (1) strong moral standards, (2) considering the effect(s) on the children, (3) fundamental anxieties, specifically the fear of being alone, and (4) not wanting to hurt other people, specifically the extramarital partner. Of these factors, moral standards and fundamental anxieties are more likely to accurately gauge a spouse not pursuing extramarital sex.

=== Gender differences ===
Men are noted to find sexual infidelity more hurtful than emotional infidelity. In terms of behavior, men are more likely to report having extramarital sex. Possible explanations for this span from the evolutionary perspective which indicates that it is a genetic advantage for men to have multiple partners.

While both men and women were equally likely to have extramarital sex with a close personal friend, a long-term acquaintance, or someone not within those categories, it was noticed that men are more likely to have a extramarital sex with a casual date or hook-up. Men were significantly more likely to report having paid for extramarital sex.

=== Impacts ===
The identity of the extramarital sexual partner can impact the marriage of the partner who engaged in such behavior, thereby increasing the risk of destabilizing it. The gender of the spouse engaging in the extramarital sex does not matter – the resulting increased risk of disruption on the marriage is the same. Relationships with an extramarital sexual partner who is a close friend as well as this behavior in general is associated with marriage dissolution.

The damaging effect of extramarital sex on marriages is undeterred by the quality of the marriage, the length of the marriage, attitude toward divorce by the recipient spouse, advice from third parties, and the presence of children in the household. The effect on more religious couples is noted to be very strong as well, though if the wife is in the workforce the effect of extramarital sex on the marriage is noted to be weaker.

== See also ==
- Adultery
- Extra-pair copulation
- Honor killing
- On-again, off-again relationship
- Swinging
- One-night stand
