= Basic hostility =

Psychological term

Basic hostility is a psychological concept that psychoanalyst Karen Horney describes as aggression that a child develops as a result of “basic evil”. Basic evil is generally defined as “invariably the lack of genuine warmth and affection”. Basic evil covers a range of inappropriate parental behavior, including but not limited to lack of affection to physical and sexual abuse. Since this situation is often unavoidable, it causes children to have a higher level of basic anxiety.

== Background ==
Specifically, basic hostility pertains to a sense of anger and betrayal that a child feels towards his parents for their failure to provide a secure environment. Horney associated this concept with "basic anxiety", citing that the two are inseparably interwoven and are both offshoots of the "basic evil" of parental mistreatment. Their relationship can be explained in this manner: The existence of basic evil leads to basic hostility towards the parents and the world. Once such hostility is repressed it becomes basic anxiety or the feeling of being helpless.

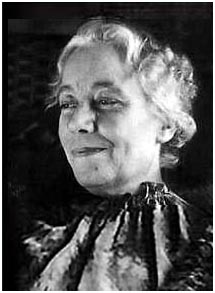
Karen Horney - 1938

Basic evil is what Horney refers to as “parental indifference”, a lack of warmth and affection in childhood. Basic hostility is the feeling of anger and betrayal that a child feels towards their parents.

== The pattern of basic hostility ==
- The child wants to leave, but cannot. Although the child wants to avoid the abuse, their parents are perpetrating it.
- The child is dependent on their parents and therefore cannot move or back away.
- The child therefore redirects their feelings and expressions of hostility toward people they do not depend on for support.

Basic Hostility is a strategy that a child uses that becomes fixed in their personality. It becomes a neurotic need, or neurosis. Neurosis is the psychic disturbance brought by fears and defense against these fears.

Some children find that hostility towards their parents and others is effective. If hostility becomes a successful coping mechanism for the child, it will become a habitual response to conflicts. Most children will not use hostility as a coping mechanism and instead will struggle with basic anxiety. Basic anxiety suppresses basic hostility, children then become compliant with their parents. Horney also suggests there is a third coping mechanism which is withdrawing from their families.

== 10 Neurotic Needs ==
The ten neurotic needs that Horney describes throughout her work are the needs that are either met or not met in childhood. These neurotic needs are defined as underlying human needs that neurotic people take to an extreme.

=== 1. Affection and Approval ===
The desire for other people to love and approve of us. When this need is met, when an individual feels loved and approved, it affirms their sense of identity. Neurotic people often doubt their own worth and dread criticism from others but often expect it. However, criticism is not taken well.

=== 2. A Partner ===
In a neurotic relationship, a partner is seen as someone who can solve the neurotic individual's problems. The neurotic individual will project themselves onto their partner as a substitute for loving themselves. This kind of relationship may be highly manipulative.

=== 3. Power ===
The ability to dominate others or to impose one’s will. When an individual feels they have power, it gives them a sense of control. Neurotic individuals fear a lack of control and helplessness. They seek power desperately.

=== 4. Exploit and Beat Others ===
Neurotic people are uninterested in others' emotions and will use others for their gain. They use their sense of power as a way to exploit others to benefit themselves.

=== 5. Social Recognition ===
Due to neurotic people not having high self-esteem they value recognition from others about themselves. They tend to hold onto items if they are worth social value among others. They seek to understand how other individuals value and admire things.

=== 6. Personal Admiration ===
Neurotic individuals want to be recognized more than a typical recognition goes. They want to be recognized as someone who is their ideal self both internally and externally. When yearning for admiration they want it constantly and to the highest standard. They dread losing the admiration of others as well as humiliation.

=== 7. Personal Achievement ===
A neurotic individual will have goals as anyone else, however, they will seek superiority over all others. Acts of achievement are done in fair means or foul. Since they value the admiration of others, they do what makes them seen as authentic to the world around them. Not achieving a goal makes a neurotic individual feel like a failure.

=== 8. Self Sufficiency and Independence ===
Since neurotic people seek control, they may decide that others are too problematic and reject them from parts of their lives, despite wanting them for admiration and affection. They fear that these individuals will gain control of them or reject them. This differs from typical independence in which other individuals do not push away others to this extent.

=== 9. Perfection ===
Neurotic people have deep anxieties about not being perfect, which creates an obsessive drive for perfection. They are motivated by an ideal image of themselves and reality. They have a fear that they are less than perfect, creating anxiety.

=== 10. Restrict Life Within Narrow Borders ===
The feeling of content is not available to neurotic individuals. They feel threatened and undeserving. They will restrict their ambitions and material desires because they feel unworthy. They will keep their heads down and put themselves last for life’s rewards.

== How Basic Hostility and Anxiety are Presented in Individuals ==
Horney first declared the ten neurotic needs in her earlier work. However, each of the neurotic needs can be grouped into three trends: Moving Away from People, Moving Toward People, and Moving Against People.

=== Moving Away from People ===
Individuals in this dimension recognize others as a potential resource who can support them and help reduce anxiety. They seek affection, approval, and someone close who can save them.

=== Moving Toward People ===
Though similar to Moving Away from People, people in this dimension of neuroticism continue to seek approval and help from others. However, they may also seek to control them and reduce the threat they could cause. An individual in this dimension is also trying or seeking normality others around them represent.

=== Moving Against People ===
Individuals in this dimension fear criticism and harm that other people may inflict. An individual may pull back from others while holding parts of themselves at a safe distance (i.e. not sharing personal anecdotes from their lives or showing vulnerability).

== See also ==
- Basic anxiety
- Disorganized attachment
