= Enemy complex =

Mental disorder

An enemy complex is in modern psychology a mental disorder in which a person falsely believes they are surrounded by enemies. Additional disorders of the mind generally accompanied with an enemy complex include paranoia and low-self esteem.

== Joseph Stalin ==
American historian Robert C. Tucker used the phrase in his 1988 book Stalin as Revolutionary to describe the mental state of Soviet dictator Joseph Stalin.

== Mike Tyson ==
Mike Tyson described himself having an enemy complex. Thinking that his opponents and their coaches and trainers were his enemies.

== See also ==
- Delusion
- Distrust
