= List of psychotherapy journals =

This is a list of academic journals pertaining to the field of psychotherapy.

- American Journal of Psychotherapy
- Clinical Social Work Journal
- Journal of Cognitive Psychotherapy
- Journal of Consulting and Clinical Psychology
- Psychotherapy
- Psychotherapy Research
- Psychotherapy and Psychosomatics
- Journal of Counseling Psychology
- Journal of Psychotherapy Integration
- Counselling and Psychotherapy Research
- Journal of Psychotherapy Practice and Research
- Journal of Evidence-Based Psychotherapies

== Psychoanalysis ==
- The American Journal of Psychoanalysis
- Contemporary Psychoanalysis
- Hurly-Burly, The International Lacanian Journal of Psychoanalysis
- The International Journal of Psychoanalysis
- International Journal of Psychoanalytic Psychotherapy
- Journal of the American Psychoanalytic Association
