= Stephen F. Cohen =

American scholar of Russian studies (1938–2020)

Stephen Frand Cohen
- Born: November 25, 1938; Indianapolis, Indiana, U.S.
- Died: September 18, 2020 (aged 81); New York City, U.S.
- Spouse(s): Lynn Blair (divorced); Katrina vanden Heuvel (m. 1988)
- Children: 1 son, 2 daughters

Academic background
- Education: Indiana University, Bloomington (BS, MA); Columbia University (PhD)
- Thesis: Bukharin and Russian Bolshevism, 1888–1927 (1968)
- Doctoral advisor: John N. Hazard
- Other advisor: Robert C. Tucker

Stephen Frand Cohen (November 25, 1938 – September 18, 2020) was an American scholar of Russian studies. His academic work concentrated on modern Russian history since the Bolshevik Revolution and Russia's relationship with the United States.

Cohen was a contributing editor to The Nation magazine, published and partially owned by his wife Katrina vanden Heuvel. Cohen was a founding director of the 2015 reestablished American Committee for East–West Accord.

Cohen was a celebrated figure in the Sovietology academic field, earning plaudits even from those diametrically opposed to him ideologically. Richard Pipes, Cohen's longtime academic rival, hailed him as "the second-brightest expert in the field."

== Early life and academic career ==
Cohen was born to a Jewish family in Indianapolis, Indiana, and later grew up in Owensboro, Kentucky, the son of Ruth (Frand) and Marvin Cohen, who owned a jewelry store and a golf course in Hollywood, Florida. His paternal grandfather had emigrated to the United States from Lithuania (then part of the Russian Empire) and worked as a cooper producing beer barrels in Cleveland; his maternal grandparents had arrived from Austria and the grandfather was a roofer in Indianapolis.

Cohen graduated from the Pine Crest School in Florida. He attended Indiana University Bloomington, where he studied under the guidance of Robert C. Tucker and earned a B.S. in economics and public policy in 1960 and an M.A. in government and Russian studies in 1962. In 1959, while on a three-term undergraduate study abroad program at the University of Birmingham in England, he took a four-week trip to the Soviet Union and developed an interest in its history and politics. Prior to that, his ambition had been to become a professional golfer.

He completed his Ph.D. in government and Russian studies at Columbia University in 1968 under the supervision of John N. Hazard (studying alongside William Taubman) with a thesis entitled "Bukharin and Russian Bolshevism, 1888–1927". He had received a junior fellowship attached to Zbigniew Brzezinski's seminar on communism and worked as a teaching assistant. He was not directly involved in the 1968 Columbia University protests but as a graduate instructor he helped expelled students find a place at another university. He became a professor of politics at Princeton University later that year and remained on its faculty until 1998, when he became Professor of Politics, emeritus. He then taught at New York University until his retirement in 2011, when he became professor emeritus of Russian and Slavic Studies.

== Writings and activities ==
=== Soviet and Yeltsin eras ===
In his first book, Bukharin and the Bolshevik Revolution, a biography of Nikolai Bukharin, a leading Bolshevik official and editor of Pravda, the official newspaper of the Communist Party of the Soviet Union, Cohen argued that Communism in the Soviet Union could have easily taken a different direction, not leading to Joseph Stalin's dictatorship and purges. Cohen wrote that it was completely possible for Bukharin to have succeeded Lenin and that the Soviet Union under Bukharin would have had greater openness, economic flexibility, and democracy. The book was widely praised, with economic historian Alec Nove describing it as "the best book on the USSR to be published for many years". Richard Lowenthal in a 1985 review of Cohen's Rethinking the Soviet Experience: Politics and History since 1917 said that many scholars of history consider "such an iffy assumption as illegitimate". According to Eugene Huskey, William R. Kenan chair at Stetson University, in the 1970s Cohen viewed the Soviet Union as "simply inefficient and corrupt" rather than a totalitarian state.

In his book War with Russia? (2019), Cohen wrote that at "least one U.S.–Soviet summit seems to have been sabotaged. The third Eisenhower–Khrushchev meeting, scheduled for Paris in 1960, was aborted when the Soviets shot down a US U-2 spy plane sent by what he refers to as the US deep state. During the Cold War, Cohen was critical of both Western hawks and also the Soviet government, which banned him from visiting the country from 1982 to 1985. Cohen said in early 1985 that the reasons had not been revealed to him.

Cohen gave his support to perestroika, the reforms initiated by Mikhail Gorbachev and, with his wife, Katrina vanden Heuvel, co-authored Voices of Glasnost: Interviews With Gorbachev’s Reformers (1989). In a March 1991 op-ed for The New York Times, he wrote that Gorbachev's government "has undertaken the most ambitious changes in modern history. Their goal is to 'dismantle' the state controls Stalin imposed and to achieve an 'emancipation of society' through privatization, democratization, and federalization of the 15 republics." He said that perestroika was then in crisis, and stated: "Russia has come closer to democracy than ever before. Though democratization remains exceedingly fragile, how can this be dismissed as a failure?" Cohen was a friend of former Soviet President Mikhail Gorbachev, who invited him to attend the 1989 May Day parade in Red Square, and advised former U.S. President George H. W. Bush in the late 1980s. Cohen helped Nikolai Bukharin's widow, Anna Larina, to rehabilitate her name during the Soviet era.

In his book Failed Crusade: America and the Tragedy of Post-Communist Russia (2000), Cohen criticized the role that American advisors and journalists, along with the Clinton administration, had played in Russia's transition from communism during the presidency of Boris Yeltsin. He also criticized many of Boris Yeltsin's decisions, and claimed that Yeltsin destroyed a democratic transition that had been initiated by Mikhail Gorbachev. Cohen wrote that the way the US handled Russia's post-communist transition during the 1990s was "the worst American foreign policy disaster since Vietnam, and its consequences more long-term and perilous." He later wrote in 2006 that the US continued the Cold War after the breakup of the Soviet Union in 1991. He said that President Bill Clinton backtracked on the promise of his predecessor not to extend NATO eastward and the flawed interpretation of an "American victory" and a "Russian defeat", which he believed led US leaders to believe that Russia would submit completely to US foreign policy.

=== Putin era ===
In an article for The Nation, published in the March 3, 2014 issue, Cohen wrote that "media malpractice" had resulted in the "relentless demonization of Putin" who was not an "autocrat". He wrote that the American media's coverage of Russia was "less objective, less balanced, more conformist and scarcely less ideological" than it had been during the Cold War. In a follow-up interview with Newsweek magazine, Cohen said Putin was the "best potential partner we had anywhere in the world to pursue our national security". In a CNN interview around March 2014, he said Putin was not "anti-American".

In a May 2014 Nation column coauthored with his wife, Cohen wrote that President Barack Obama had unilaterally declared a new Cold War against Russia and that those inside the Beltway were complicit in it by their silence. Julia Ioffe in The New Republic saw this as Cohen disagreeing with a consensus that did not exist. Cohen's views on US-Russian relations were criticized by Ioffe and others as being pro-Putin. Writing in The American Conservative, James W. Carden, a former advisor to the U.S.–Russia Bilateral Presidential Commission and soon-to-be executive editor for the American Committee for East-West Accord, described Ioffe's article as a "scurrilous—and frankly hysterical—ad hominem attack on his work and character". Carden agreed with Cohen's view that the US had failed to conduct a public debate prior to making a major shift in policy toward Russia to try to "isolate" and make it a "pariah state".

Cohen participated in a Munk Debate in Toronto, Ontario, Canada in April 2015, on the proposal "Be it resolved the West should engage not isolate Russia." With Vladimir Posner, he argued in favor of engagement, while Anne Applebaum and Garry Kasparov argued against. Cohen's side lost the debate, with 52% of the audience voting against the motion.

In a July 2015 interview, Cohen said:

Even Henry Kissinger—I think it was in March 2014 in The Washington Post—wrote this line: 'The demonization of Putin is not a policy. It's an alibi for not having a policy.' And then I wrote in reply to that: That's right, but it’s much worse than that, because it's also that the demonization of Putin is an obstacle to thinking rationally, having a rational discourse or debate about American national security. And it’s not just this catastrophe in Ukraine and the new Cold War; it's from there to Syria to Afghanistan, to the proliferation of nuclear weapons, to fighting global terrorism. The demonization of Putin excludes a partner in the Kremlin that the U.S. needs, no matter who sits there.

In an interview with Tucker Carlson on May 17, 2017, Cohen said: "You and I have to ask a subversive question: are there really three branches of government, or is there a fourth branch of government—these intel services?" He stated that a military alliance that President Obama had tried to establish with Putin against terrorism was "sabotaged by the Department of Defense and its allies in the intelligence services". Each of Trump's efforts to "cooperate with Russia" was "thwarted [by] a new leak of a story".

According to Taras Kuzio, Cohen denied that there is a cult of Stalin in Russia. Kuzio also characterised Cohen as a "fan ... of populist nationalist Trump".

=== Russo-Ukrainian war ===
In 2015, Cohen said that actions by Russia in Ukraine were justified, and that the Russo-Ukrainian war came about as a result of US actions, started by Bill Clinton and completed by George W. Bush, to enlarge NATO up to the borders of Russia. Cohen said the enlargement of NATO breached a promise not to do so that he said the US made to Gorbachev when Germany was reunited. In relation to Russia's annexation of Crimea, he said that "any Russian leader who has legitimacy at home would have had to do some version of what Putin is now doing. They'd push back". In early March 2014, Cohen said he did not know whether Russia had invaded Crimea and that, if the Russian troops that were present in Crimea had come from the naval base at Sevastopol, they had a right to be there.

In a June 30, 2014 article in The Nation, Cohen said the US was complicit in creating the crisis in Ukraine due to its support for the overthrow of President Viktor Yanukovych. He criticized the US political-media establishment for being silent about "Kiev's atrocities" in the Donbas region which is heavily populated by Russian-speaking Ukrainians and ethnic Russians. He said there was considerable pressure from within Russian society for Putin to intervene militarily to protect Donbas and that Putin had exercised "remarkable restraint".

In 2014, Cohen disputed evidence that Russia shot down Malaysia Airlines Flight 17, an event that killed all 298 passengers and crew. He said the Ukrainian government had possession of Russian Buk surface-to-air missiles, and suggested the country "was playing with its new toys and made a big mistake." Extensive analysis proved that the Buk missile launcher used to shoot down MH17 belonged to the Russian Army's 53rd Anti-Aircraft Missile Brigade and was in the hands of a pro-Russia separatist militia at the time of the shootdown.

In a 2014 article in The Nation, Cohen wrote that "the US-picked prime minister, Arseniy Yatsenyuk, referred to resisters in the Southeast as 'subhumans'." Historian Timothy Snyder disagreed with Cohen's statement, writing that Yatsenyuk, in a message of condolence to families of killed Ukrainian soldiers, described the attackers as "inhuman". Snyder suggested that the origin of Cohen's statement was Russian media mistranslation of neliudy ("inhuman") as nedocheloveki ("subhuman").

In a 2015 interview, Cohen stated that "this notion that this is all Putin’s aggression, or Russia’s aggression, is, if not 100-percent false, let us say, for the sake of being balanced and ecumenical, it's 50-percent false. And if Washington would admit that its narrative is 50-percent false, which means Russia's narrative is 50-percent correct, that's where negotiations begin and succeed."

In 2017, Cohen said the events of 2014 in Ukraine had initiated a civil war in a country in which "one part tilts toward Russia and one part tilts toward the West".

In 2020, Taras Kuzio criticized Cohen's approach to Ukraine in his 2019 book War with Russia?. Kuzio notes that Cohen doesn't believe Ukraine is a "real entity" because "eastern Ukraine has a ‘shared civilization’ with Russia", and perpetuates a "mythical stereotype of Ukraine" as composed of two distinct peoples, and therefore the 2014 conflict as a civil war. Kuzio points out that Cohen wrongly claims that "pro-Yanukovych" parties were banned in post-2014 Ukraine. Cohen says that Ukrainian volunteer battalions were dominated by extreme right ideologies and western Ukrainians but Kuzio cites research finding they were largely filled by Russian speakers and national minorities.

His views on Ukraine have been criticized and described as pro-Putin and pro-Kremlin. Cohen rejected such labels and has accused the US mainstream media of politicizing coverage about the Kremlin. According to ThinkProgress, Cohen's writings for The Nation helped lead to "[s]taffers at The Nation [...] openly revolting against the magazine's pro-Russian tilt."

=== Affiliations ===
In 2015, a proposed deal with the Association for Slavic, East European, and Eurasian Studies (ASEEES) for a fellowship that would bear Cohen's name caused controversy and was initially revoked after objections from some ASEEES members. Following a special meeting in May 2015, the board of ASEEES explained that it voted in favor of accepting "the Cohen–Tucker Fellowship as named, should the gift be re-offered" and the establishment of the Cohen–Tucker fellowship programme was announced shortly afterwards.

Also in 2015, Cohen with Gilbert Doctorow and others reestablished the American Committee for East–West Accord, which describes itself as a pro détente advocacy group. From 2015, Cohen was a member of the board of directors of the revived ACEWA. He appeared regularly on RT where he consistently advocated viewpoints supportive of the Putin government.

== Personal life and death ==
Cohen had a son and a daughter from his first marriage in 1962 to opera singer Lynn Blair, whom he later divorced. In 1988, Cohen married political journalist and magazine publisher Katrina vanden Heuvel, daughter of Jean Stein and William vanden Heuvel; the couple had a daughter.

Cohen died from lung cancer on September 18, 2020, at his home in New York City, at the age of 81.

== Bibliography ==
=== Books ===
- War with Russia? From Putin and Ukraine to Trump and Russiagate. ISBN 978-1-5107-4581-0 Pub. 2019 (released November 27, 2018) by Skyhorse Publishing.
- Soviet Fates and Lost Alternatives: From Stalinism to the New Cold War. ISBN 978-0-231-14896-2 Pub. 2009 by Columbia University Press (reprinted with a new epilogue in 2011, ISBN 978-0-231-14897-9).
- The Victims Return: Survivors of the Gulag After Stalin. ISBN 978-1-933002-40-8 Pub. 2011 by I. B. Tauris
- Failed Crusade: America and the Tragedy of Post-Communist Russia. ISBN 978-1-933002-40-8. Updated edition Pub. 2000 by W. W. Norton & Company.
- Voices of Glasnost: Interviews With Gorbachev's Reformers. ISBN 978-0-393-02625-2 Pub. 1989 by W. W. Norton & Company.
- Sovieticus: American Perceptions and Soviet Realities. ISBN 978-0-393-30338-4 Pub. 1986 by W. W. Norton & Co.
- Rethinking the Soviet Experience: Politics and History Since 1917. ISBN 978-0-19-504016-6 Pub. 1985 by Oxford University Press.
- An End to Silence: Uncensored Opinion in the Soviet Union, from Roy Medvedev's Underground Magazine "Political Diary". ISBN 978-0-393-30127-4 Pub. 1982 Norton.
- Bukharin and the Bolshevik Revolution: A Political Biography, 1888–1938. ISBN 978-0-19-502697-9. Pub. 1980 by Oxford University Press. First edition was OUP 1971.

=== Essays and articles ===
- "The Friends and Foes of Change: Reformism and Conservatism in the Soviet Union" in: Alexander Dallin/Gail W. Lapidus (eds.): The Soviet System: From Crisis to Collapse. Westview Press, Boulder/San Francisco/Oxford 2005 ISBN 0-8133-1876-9
- "Stalinism and Bolshevism" in: Robert C. Tucker (ed.): Stalinism: Essays in Historical Interpretation, Transaction Publishers, New Brunswick, New Jersey, 1977. ISBN 0-7658-0483-2
