= Karen Horney =

German psychoanalyst (1885–1952)

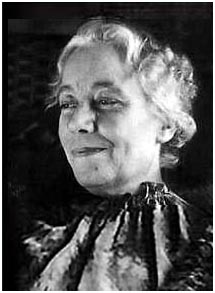
- Born: Karen Danielsen; 16 September 1885; Blankenese, German Empire
- Died: 4 December 1952 (aged 67); New York City, U.S.
- Education: University of Berlin (M.D., 1913)
- Known for: Theory of neurotic needs, feminine psychology, feminist psychology
- Spouse: Oskar Horney
- Children: 3, including Brigitte
- Scientific career
- Fields: Psychoanalysis

Karen Horney (/ˈhɔːrnaɪ/; German: [ˈhɔʁnaɪ]; née Danielsen; 16 September 1885 – 4 December 1952) was a German psychoanalyst who practiced in the United States during her later career. Her theories questioned some traditional Freudian views, specifically in theories of sexuality and of the instinct orientation of psychoanalysis. Horney is also credited with founding feminist psychology in response to Freud's theory of penis envy. She disagreed with Freud about inherent differences in the psychology of men and women, and like Alfred Adler, she traced such differences to society and culture rather than biology.

== Theoretical orientation ==
Those in The Cultural School of thought include Horney, Erich Fromm, Harry Stack Sullivan, and Clara Thompson.

Horney is often classified as neo-Freudian but may also be seen as neo-Adlerian (Ansbacher, 1979), although it is contended neither Horney nor Adler directly influenced one another (Mosak, 1989).

== Early life ==
Horney was born Karen Danielsen on 16 September 1885 in Blankenese, Germany, near Hamburg. Her father, Berndt Wackels Danielsen (1836–1910), was Norwegian but had German citizenship. He was a ship's captain in the merchant marine, and a Protestant traditionalist (his children nicknamed him "the Bible-thrower", as he did indeed throw Bibles).

Her mother, Clotilde, née van Ronzelen (1853–1911), known as "Sonni", was also Protestant, of Dutch origin. She was said to be more open-minded than Berndt, and yet she was "depressed, irritable, and domineering toward Karen".

Karen's elder brother was also named Berndt, and Karen cared for him deeply. She also had four elder half-siblings from her father's previous marriage. However, there was no contact between the children of her father's two marriages.

Horney kept diaries beginning at the age of thirteen. These journals showed Horney's confidence in her path for the future. She considered becoming a doctor, even though, at that time, women were not allowed to attend universities.

According to Horney's adolescent diaries her father was "a cruel disciplinary figure," who also held his son Berndt in higher regard than Karen. Instead of being offended or feeling indignation over Karen's perceptions of him, her father brought her gifts from far-away countries. Despite this, Karen always felt deprived of her father's affection and instead became attached to her mother. (Note: This is to a large extent due to the fact that her father was hardly ever present. The ship of which he was a captain went back and forth to South America. A son and a daughter from the captain's first marriage died in Chile and Bolivia respectively.)

From roughly the age of nine, Karen became ambitious and somewhat rebellious. Contrary to the way others viewed her, she felt she could not become pretty, and instead decided to vest her energies into her intellectual qualities. At this time she developed a crush on her older brother, who became embarrassed by her attentions—soon pushing her away. She suffered the first of several bouts of depression—an issue that would plague her for the rest of her life.

In 1904, when Karen was 19, her mother left her father (without divorcing him), taking the children with her.

== Education ==
Horney's mother and brother encouraged her academic and career goals; she completed the Realgymnasium in Hamburg and entered medical school in 1906 at the University of Freiburg, one of the first institutions in Germany to enroll women in medical courses. Higher education only became available to women in Germany in 1900. By 1908, Horney had transferred to the University of Göttingen, then to the University of Berlin before graduating with an M.D. in 1911.

Through her fellow student Carl Müller-Braunschweig—who later became a psychoanalyst—she met the business student Oskar Horney. They married in 1909. The couple moved to Berlin together, where Oskar worked in industry while Karen continued her studies at the Charité. In the same year, Karen gave birth to her first child and lost both of her parents. She entered psychoanalysis to help herself cope. Horney completed 500 hours of treatment with her first analyst, Karl Abraham, in 1910, then she moved to Hanns Sachs.

From 1923 to 1935, Horney published thirteen major papers grounded in feminine psychology, developing the idea of secondary penis envy; she emphasized the way young girls are treated by their parents over Freud’s sole focus on the father. She proposed that women feel inferior due to the societal devaluation of femininity, including the mother-daughter relationship, rather than a biological desire alone. After moving to New York in 1934, Horney continued to write, taught technique courses, treated clients privately, and served as a psychiatrist for the United Jewish Aid Society. In addition to her books, Horney also hosted symposia to promote the idea that human nature is capable of change, supported by morals and constructive forces at play.

== Career and works ==
Horney is often thought of primarily as a neo-Freudian member of "the cultural school," which also includes Erich Fromm, Harry Stack Sullivan, Clara Thompson, and Abram Kardiner.

— Bernard J. Paris

In 1920, Horney was a founding member of the Berlin Psychoanalytic Institute. She then took up a teaching position within the Institute. She helped design and eventually directed the Society's training program, taught students, and conducted psychoanalytic research. She also saw patients for private psychoanalytic sessions, and continued to work at the hospital.

By 1923, Oskar Horney's firm became insolvent, and Oskar developed meningitis soon after. He rapidly became embittered, morose and argumentative. That same year, Horney's brother died of a pulmonary infection. Both events contributed to a worsening of Horney's mental health. She entered into a second period of deep depression; she swam out to sea during a vacation and considered committing suicide. In 1926, Horney and her husband separated; they would divorce in 1937. She and their three daughters moved out of Oskar's house. Oskar had proven to be very similar to Horney's father, with an authoritarian personality. After studying more psychoanalytic theory, Horney regretted not objecting to her husband ruling over their children when they were younger.

Despite her increasing deviation from orthodox Freudian doctrine, she practised and taught at the Berlin Psychoanalytic Society until 1932. Freud's increasing coolness toward her and her concern over the rise of Nazism in Germany motivated her to accept an invitation by Franz Alexander to become his assistant at the Chicago Institute of Psychoanalysis, and in 1932, she and her daughters moved to the United States.

Two years after moving to Chicago, Horney relocated to Brooklyn. Brooklyn was home to a large Jewish community, including a growing number of refugees from Nazi Germany, and psychoanalysis thrived there. It was in Brooklyn Horney became friends with analysts such as Harry Stack Sullivan and Erich Fromm. She had a sexual relationship with Fromm that ended bitterly.

While living in Brooklyn, Horney taught and trained psychoanalysts in New York City, working both at the New School for Social Research and the New York Psychoanalytic Institute.

It was in Brooklyn that Horney developed and advanced her composite theories regarding neurosis and personality, based on experiences gained from working in psychotherapy. In 1937 she published The Neurotic Personality of Our Time, which had wide popular readership. Horney left the New York Psychoanalytic Institute in 1941 and founded the Association for the Advancement of Psychoanalysis; she became Dean of the American Institute of Psychoanalysis, a training institute for those who were interested in Horney's organization. She founded this organization after becoming dissatisfied with the generally strict, orthodox nature of the prevailing psychoanalytic community.

Horney's deviation from Freudian psychology led to her resigning from her post, and she soon took up teaching in the New York Medical College. She also founded a journal, the American Journal of Psychoanalysis. She taught at the New York Medical College and continued practicing as a psychiatrist until her death in 1952.

== Narcissism ==
Horney saw narcissism quite differently from Freud, Kohut, and other mainstream psychoanalytic theorists in that she did not posit a primary narcissism but saw the narcissistic personality as the product of a certain kind of early environment acting on a certain kind of temperament. For her, narcissistic needs and tendencies are not inherent in human nature.

Narcissism is different from Horney's other major defensive strategies or solutions in that it is not compensatory. Self-idealization is compensatory in her theory, but it differs from narcissism. All the defensive strategies involve self-idealization, but in the narcissistic solution, it tends to be the product of indulgence rather than deprivation. The narcissist's self-esteem is not strong, however, because it is not based on genuine accomplishments.

== Neo-psychoanalytic theories ==
Mosak (1989) states that while there is no direct evidence Alfred Adler and Horney influenced one another, they landed at similar theoretical understandings. While Horney acknowledged and agreed with Freud on many issues, she was also critical of him on several key beliefs.

Like others whose views differed from that of Freud, Horney felt sex and aggression were not the primary factors that shape personality. Horney, along with Adler, believed there were greater influences on personality, including social relationship factors during childhood, rather than just repressed sexual passions. The two focused more on how the conscious mind plays a role in human personality, not just subconscious repression. Freud's notion of "penis envy" was particularly subject to criticism, as well. She thought Freud had merely stumbled upon women's jealousy of men's generic power in the world. Horney accepted penis envy might occur occasionally in neurotic women, but stated that "womb envy" occurs just as much in men: Horney felt men were envious of a woman's ability to bear children. The degree to which men are driven to success may be merely a substitute for the fact they cannot carry, bear, and nurture children. Horney also thought men were envious of women because they fulfill their position in society by simply "being", whereas men achieve their manhood according to their ability to provide and succeed.

Horney was bewildered by psychiatrists' tendency to place so much emphasis on the penis. She also reworked the Freudian Oedipal complex of the sexual elements, claiming the clinging to one parent and jealousy of the other was simply the result of anxiety, caused by a disturbance in the parent-child relationship.

Despite these variances with the prevalent Freudian view, Horney strove to reformulate Freudian thought, presenting a holistic, humanistic view of the individual psyche which placed much emphasis on cultural and social differences worldwide.

== Feminine psychology ==
Horney was also a pioneer in the discipline of feminine psychiatry. As one of the first female psychiatrists, she was the first known woman to present a paper regarding feminine psychiatry. Fourteen of the papers she wrote between 1922 and 1937 were amalgamated into a single volume titled Feminine Psychology (1967). As a woman, she felt the mapping out of trends in female behaviour was a neglected issue. Women were regarded as objects of charm and beauty—at variance with every human being's ultimate purpose of self-actualization.

Women, according to Horney, traditionally gain value only through their children and the wider family. She de-romanticized the Victorian concept of how a marriage bond should be. Horney explained that the "monogamous demand represents the fulfillment of narcissistic and sadistic impulses far more than it indicates the wishes of genuine love”. Most notably, her work "The Problem of the Monogamous Ideal" was fixed upon marriage, as were six other of Horney's papers. Her essay "Maternal Conflicts" attempted to shed new light on the problems women experience when raising adolescents.

Horney believed both men and women have a drive to be ingenious and productive. Women are able to satisfy this need normally and internally—to do this they become pregnant and give birth. Men satisfy this need only through external ways; Horney proposed that the striking accomplishments of men in work or some other field can be viewed as compensation for their inability to give birth to children.

Horney developed her ideas to the extent that she released one of the first "self-help" books in 1946, entitled Are You Considering Psychoanalysis?. The book asserted that individuals with relatively minor neurotic problems could, in effect, be their own psychiatrists. She continually stressed self-awareness was a part of becoming a better, stronger, richer human being.

== Mature theory ==
In the mid-1930s, Horney stopped writing on the topic of feminine psychology and never resumed. Her biographer B.J. Paris writes:

Horney's apparent loss of interest in feminine psychology has led some to contend she was never really a feminist, despite the fact she was far ahead of her time in her trenchant critique of the patriarchal ideology of her culture and the phallocentricity of psychoanalysis. Janet Sayers argues that although Horney's "rejection of Freud's work in the name of women's self-esteem has certainly inspired many feminists," she herself "was far too much of an individualist ever to engage in collective political struggle—feminist or otherwise."

Instead, she became increasingly interested in the subject of neurosis. Horney's mature theory of neurosis, according to Paris, "makes a major contribution to psychological thought—particularly the study of personality—that deserves to be more widely known and applied than it is."

Horney looked at neurosis in a different light from other psychoanalysts of the time. Her expansive interest in the subject led her to compile a detailed theory of neurosis, with data from her patients. Horney believed neurosis to be a continuous process—with neuroses commonly occurring sporadically in a person's lifetime. This was in contrast to the opinions of her contemporaries who believed neurosis was, like more severe mental conditions, a negative malfunction of the mind in response to external stimuli, such as bereavement, divorce or negative experiences during childhood and adolescence. This has been debated widely by contemporary psychologists.

Horney believed these stimuli to be less important, except for influences during childhood. Rather, she placed significant emphasis on parental indifference towards the child, believing a child's perception of events, as opposed to the parent's intentions, is the key to understanding a person's neurosis. For instance, a child might feel a lack of warmth and affection should a parent make fun of the child's feelings. The parent may also casually neglect to fulfill promises, which in turn could have a detrimental effect on the child's mental state.

From her experiences as a psychiatrist, Horney named ten patterns of neurotic needs. These ten needs are based upon things which she thought all humans require to succeed in life. Horney modified these needs somewhat to correspond with what she believed were individuals' neuroses. A neurotic person could theoretically exhibit all of these needs, though in practice fewer than the ten here need to be present for a person to be considered a neurotic.

=== Ten neurotic needs ===
The ten needs, as set out by Horney, (classified according to her so-called coping strategies) are as follows:

Moving Toward People (Compliance)

- 1. The need for affection and approval; pleasing others and being liked by them.
- 2. The need for a partner; one whom they can love and who will solve all problems.

Moving Against People (Aggression)

- 3. The need for power; the ability to bend wills and achieve control over others—while most persons seek strength, the neurotic may be desperate for it.
- 4. The need to exploit others; to get the better of them. To become manipulative, fostering the belief that people are there simply to be used.
- 5. The need for social recognition; prestige and limelight.
- 6. The need for personal admiration; for both inner and outer qualities—to be valued.
- 7. The need for personal achievement; though virtually all persons wish to make achievements, as with No. 5, the neurotic may be desperate for achievement.

Moving Away from People (Withdrawal)

- 8. The need for self-sufficiency and independence; while most desire some autonomy, the neurotic may simply wish to discard other individuals entirely.
- 9. The need for perfection; while many are driven to perfect their lives in the form of well being, the neurotic may display a fear of being slightly flawed.
- 10. Lastly, the need to restrict life practices to within narrow borders; to live as inconspicuous a life as possible.

=== Three categories of needs ===
Upon investigating the ten needs further, Horney found she was able to condense them into three broad categories:

Compliance
Needs one, two and three (affection and approval, partner, power) were assimilated into the compliance category, also called moving toward people. This category is seen as a process of joining, submitting, or self-effacement. Under Horney's theory children facing difficulties with parents often use this strategy. Fear of helplessness and abandonment occurs—phenomena Horney refers to as "basic anxiety". Those within the compliance category tend to exhibit a need for affection and approval on the part of their peers. They may also seek out a partner, somebody to confide in, fostering the belief that, in turn, all of life's problems would be solved by the new cohort. A lack of demands and a desire for inconspicuousness both occur in these individuals.
Expansion/Aggression
Needs four through eight (exploit others, social recognition, personal admiration, personal achievement, self-sufficiency) were assimilated into the expansion category, also called moving against people, or the expansive solution. Neurotic children or adults within this category often exhibit anger or basic hostility to those around them. That is, there is a need for power, a need for control and exploitation, and a maintenance of a facade of omnipotence. Manipulative qualities aside, under Horney's assertions the expansive individual may also wish for social recognition, not necessarily in terms of limelight, but in terms of simply being known (perhaps feared) by subordinates and peers alike. In addition, the individual has needs for a degree of personal admiration by those within this person's social circle and, lastly, for raw personal achievement. These characteristics comprise the "expansive" neurotic type. Expansive types also tend to keep people around them. On the other hand, they only care about their wants and needs. They would do whatever they can to satisfy their needs and wouldn't desist from hurting anyone in the obtainment of them.
Detachment/Withdrawal
Needs nine through ten (perfection, restrict life practices) are assimilated into the detachment category, also called moving-away-from or resigning solution or a detached personality. As neither aggression nor compliance solve parental indifference, Horney recognized children might simply try to become self-sufficient. The withdrawing neurotic may disregard others in a non-aggressive manner, regarding solitude and independence as the way forth. The stringent needs for perfection comprise another part of this category; those withdrawing may strive for perfection above all else, to the point where being flawed is utterly unacceptable. Everything the "detached" type does must be unassailable and refined. They suppress or deny all feelings towards others, particularly love and hate.

=== Self-realization ===
Near the end of her career, Karen Horney summarized her ideas in Neurosis and Human Growth: The Struggle Toward Self-Realization, her major work published in 1950. It's in this book she summarizes her ideas regarding neurosis, clarifying her three neurotic "solutions" to the stresses of life. The expansive solution became a tripartite combination of narcissistic, perfectionistic and arrogant-vindictive approaches to life. (Horney had previously focused on the psychiatric concept of narcissism in a book published in 1939, New Ways in Psychoanalysis.) Her other two neurotic "solutions" were also a refinement of her previous views: self-effacement, or submission to others, and resignation, or detachment from others. She described case studies of symbiotic relationships between arrogant-vindictive and self-effacing individuals, labeling such a relationship bordering on sadomasochism as a morbid dependency. She believed individuals in the neurotic categories of narcissism and resignation were much less susceptible to such relationships of co-dependency with an arrogant-vindictive neurotic.

While non-neurotic individuals may strive for these needs, neurotics exhibit a much deeper, more willful and concentrated desire to fulfill the said needs.

=== Theory of the self ===
Horney also shared Abraham Maslow's view that self-actualization is something that all people strive for. By "self" she understood the core of one's own being and potential. Horney believed that if we have an accurate conception of our own self, then we are free to realize our potential and achieve what we wish, within reasonable boundaries. Thus, she believed self-actualization is the healthy person's aim through life—as opposed to the neurotic's clinging to a set of key needs.

According to Horney we can have two views of our self: the "real self" and the "ideal self". The real self is who and what we actually are. The ideal self is the type of person we feel we should be. The real self has the potential for growth, happiness, will power, realization of gifts, etc., but it also has deficiencies. The ideal self is used as a model to assist the real self in developing its potential and achieving self-actualization. (Engler 125) But it is important to know the differences between our ideal and real self.

The neurotic person's self is split between an idealized self and a real self. As a result, neurotic individuals feel they somehow do not live up to the ideal self. They feel there is a flaw somewhere in comparison to what they "should" be. The goals set out by the neurotic are not realistic, or indeed possible. The real self then degenerates into a "despised self", and the neurotic person assumes this is the "true" self. Thus, the neurotic is like a clock's pendulum, oscillating between a fallacious "perfection" and a manifestation of self-hate. Horney referred to this phenomenon as the "tyranny of the shoulds" and the neurotic's hopeless "search for glory". She concluded these ingrained traits of the psyche forever prevent an individual's potential from being actualized unless the cycle of neurosis is somehow broken, through treatment or, in less severe cases, life lesson.

== Karen Horney Clinic ==
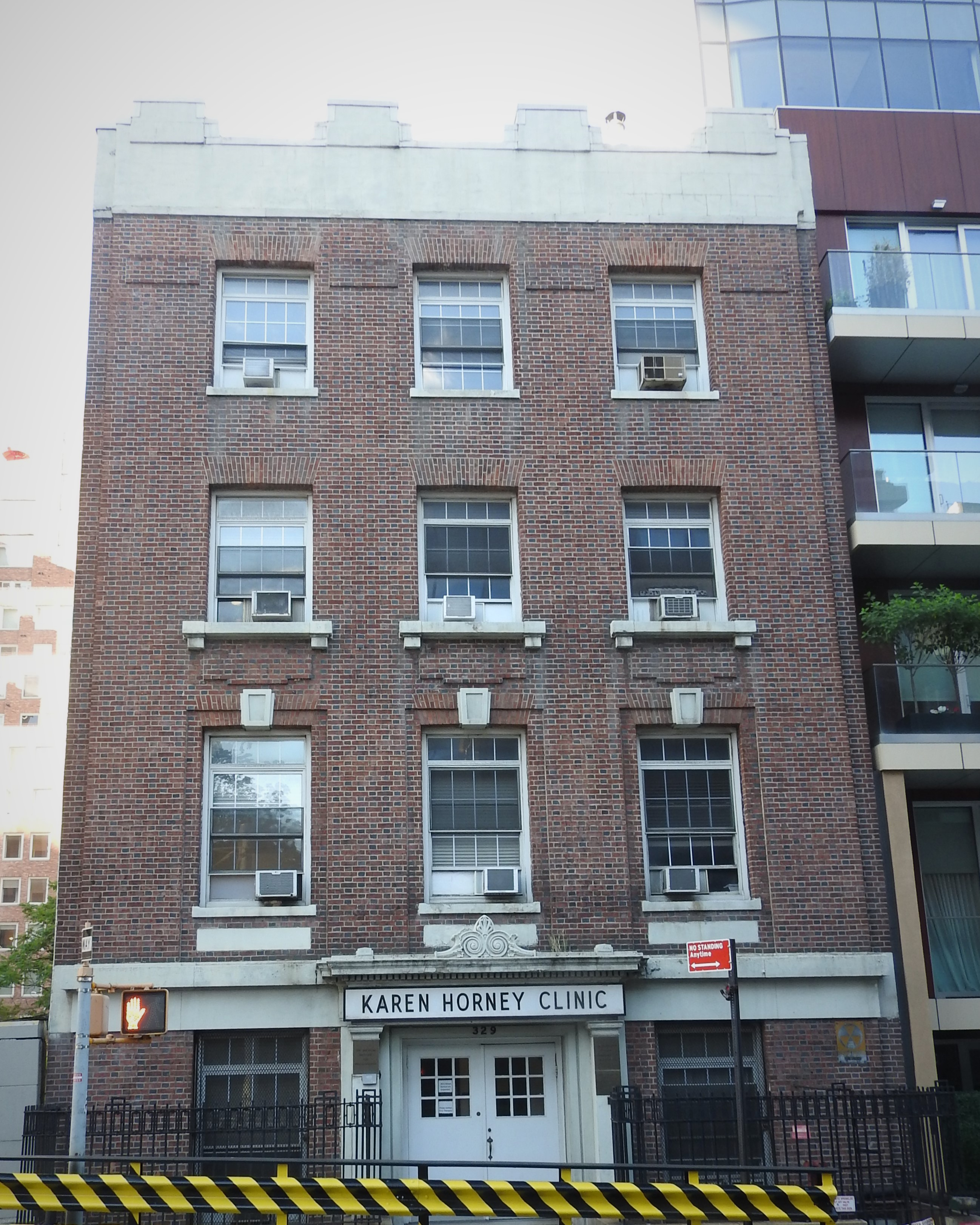
Clinic on East 62nd Street

The Karen Horney Clinic opened on May 6, 1955 in New York City to honor Horney's achievements. The institution seeks to continue research and train medical professionals in the psychiatric fields to serve in a low-cost treatment center. Patients unsuitable for receive psychotherapeutic treatment like supportive psychotherapy and psychoanalytic psychotherapy, grounded in Horney's theory.

From its beginning, the Karen Horney Clinic has trained candidates for the American Institute for Psychoanalysis, which Horney co-founded in 1941. In the 1980s, the Institute initiated the first Psychodynamic Psychotherapy Program with the goal of making Horney’s contributions more accessible in the place she made them a reality. Individual populations now have their own programs for members to specialize in, including children and adolescents, those struggling with trauma, adult programs, and chemical abuse and psychiatry.

Despite these changes, the clinic remains grounded in Horney’s theory, requiring every new member to take a class on concepts like neurotic claims, the tyranny of shoulds, and the real self, among others. The clinic pushes to preserve a psychodynamic approach to treating clients, operating under Horney’s constructive attitude towards self development to attend to the thousands of calls and services they provide each year.

== Works ==
The following are all still in print:

- Neurosis and Human Growth, Norton, New York, 1950. ISBN 0393001350
- Are You Considering Psychoanalysis? Norton, 1946. ISBN 0393001318
- Our Inner Conflicts, Norton, 1945. ISBN 0393001334
- Self-analysis, Norton, 1942. ISBN 0393001342
- New Ways in Psychoanalysis, Norton, 1939. ISBN 0393001326 (alternate link)
- The Neurotic Personality of our Time, Norton, 1937. ISBN 0393010120
- Feminine Psychology (reprint of papers written between 1922 and 1937), Norton, 1967. ISBN 0393006867
- The Collected Works of Karen Horney (2 vols.), Norton, 1950. ISBN 1199366358
- The Adolescent Diaries of Karen Horney, Basic Books, New York, 1980. ISBN 046500055X
- The Therapeutic Process: Essays and Lectures, ed. Bernard J. Paris, Yale University Press, New Haven, 1999. ISBN 0300075278
- The Unknown Karen Horney: Essays on Gender, Culture, and Psychoanalysis, ed. Bernard J. Paris, Yale University Press, New Haven, 2000. ISBN 0300080425
- Final Lectures, ed. Douglas H. Ingram, Norton, 1991. 128 pp. ISBN 978-0393307559

== See also ==
- Auto-psychotherapy
- History of psychology
- History of narcissism
- Mental illness
- Narcissistic abuse
- Phallic monism
- Unconscious mind
