= International Journal of Psychoanalytic Psychotherapy =

- Discipline: psychiatry and psychotherapy
- Language: English

Publication details
- Publisher: International Science Press (1965-1973)

Standard abbreviations
- ISO 4: Int. J. Psychoanal. Psychother.

Indexing
- CODEN: IJPSDD
- ISSN: 0090-6891
- OCLC no.: 01645841

The International Journal of Psychoanalytic Psychotherapy was a peer-reviewed scientific journal of psychiatry and psychotherapy published by the International Journal Press and Jason Aronson from 1974 until 1985.

It was formed by the merger of the International Journal of Psychiatry published by the International Science Press from 1965 until 1973, and the International Journal of Child Psychotherapy (ISSN 0090-6891, CODEN IJPSDD, OCLC 01645841) published by the International Journal Press from 1972 until 1973. At some point or another during their respective existences, all three titles were included in the Science Citation Index and PubMed/MEDLINE.

== See also ==
- List of psychiatry journals
- List of psychotherapy journals
