= ISIS: Inside the Army of Terror =

2015 non-fiction book

- Author: Michael Weiss; Hassan Hassan
- Subject: Islamic State of Iraq and the Levant, terrorism
- Publisher: Regan Arts
- Publication date: February 17, 2015
- Pages: 288
- ISBN: 1941393578

ISIS: Inside the Army of Terror is a 2015 non-fiction book by the journalists Michael Weiss and Hassan Hassan. The book details the rise and inner workings of the terrorist group ISIS.

== Reception ==
ISIS: Inside the Army of Terror has been praised by critics. Steve Negus of The New York Times compared the book favorably to Jessica Stern and J.M. Berger's ISIS: The State of Terror and Patrick Cockburn's The Rise of Islamic State, calling ISIS: Inside the Army of Terror "the most comprehensive of the three." He added, "This account of the Islamic State in Iraq is a valuable summation, but it really shines when it reaches the group's entry into Syria starting in 2011. Weiss and Hassan use their own interviews with members to draw out the range of motivations for why Syrians join such an extreme organization." James Traub of The Wall Street Journal was similarly impressed by the work, observing, "If ISIS really were a business-school case, we would want to understand how its distinctive culture evolved. On this subject, Ms. Stern and Mr. Berger largely rely on second-hand sources. We must turn instead to ISIS: Inside the Army of Terror, by Michael Weiss and Hassan Hassan, who have talked to a great many of the jihadists themselves and tell a far more detailed and nuanced story." Robin Yassin-Kassab of The Guardian wrote, "Weiss and Hassan have produced a detailed and readable book. Their informants include American and regional military officials and intelligence operatives, defected Syrian spies and diplomats, and – most fascinating of all – Syrians who work for Isis (these are divided into categories such as politickers, pragmatists, opportunists and fence-sitters). The authors provide useful insights into Isis governance – a combination of divide-and-rule, indoctrination and fear – and are well placed for the task."
