= New Lines Institute =

American foreign policy think tank

New Lines Institute for Strategy and Policy
- Abbreviation: New Lines Institute
- Formation: 2019; 7 years ago
- Founder: Ahmed Alwani
- Type: Foreign policy think tank
- Tax ID no.: 87-4112195
- Headquarters: 1660 L Street NW, Suite 450
- Location: Washington, D.C., U.S.
- Publication: New Lines Magazine
- Website: newlinesinstitute.org

The New Lines Institute for Strategy and Policy, known as New Lines Institute for short, is an American think tank focused on international affairs. It was founded in 2019 by Ahmed Alwani, and was named one of the "best new think tanks" in the University of Pennsylvania's annual ranking of global think tanks in 2020. It publishes New Lines Magazine.

The New Lines Institute gained attention in March 2021 following extensive media coverage of a report on the treatment of the Uyghur population in China. The report was the first of its kind on the topic, and was identified by the Uyghur Tribunal as one of the main sources of evidence on which it had based its final judgment in December 2021.

New Lines institute publishes New Lines Magazine, a global affairs magazine edited by Syrian-born American author and journalist Hassan Hassan.

== History ==
The New Lines Institute for Strategy and Policy was founded in 2019 by Iraqi-American entrepreneur Dr Ahmed Alwani as a non-partisan think tank based in Washington D.C.

The institute specializes in international affairs. It describes its purpose as to "shape U.S. foreign policy based on a deep understanding of regional geopolitics and the value systems of those regions."

In October 2020, New Lines Institute launched New Lines Magazine, a global affairs magazine that aims to look at foreign affairs stories from a local perspective.

== Research ==
New Lines Institute's research work focuses on "issues at the intersection of U.S. foreign policy and global geopolitics."

=== Genocide of the Uyghurs ===
In March 2021, New Lines Institute's research on the treatment of the Uyghurs in Xinjiang province was the first to establish the legal case for labelling China's actions as genocide. Vox senior reporter Sigal Samuel described this work as the culmination of three years of reporting on the Uyghurs.

The research received considerable media coverage at the time, and two of the report's authors were invited to give evidence at the Uyghur Tribunal in September 2021. The Tribunal itself credited New Lines' report as one of the main sources of evidence in its final judgment in December 2021.

=== The trade of captagon in Syria ===
In April 2022, New Lines Institute exposed how the Syrian economy was reliant on the trade of illegal captagon, which was being exploited by Syrian actors aligned with the Assad regime. The research was eventually picked up by mainstream media, before being used as a key piece of evidence to inform the Illicit Captagon Trafficking Suppression Act 2023 in the U.S. It has been credited by Rep. French Hill, who sponsored the Act, for bringing President Bashar Al-Assad's trade of captagon in Syria to public attention.

=== The Silk Seven Plus economic community ===
In January 2026, New Lines Institute put forward an initiative for an economic grouping for the region of Central Asia. The group, called Silk Seven Plus – or S7+ for short – would follow the ASEAN model and comprise Kazakhstan, Kyrgyzstan, Tajikistan, Turkmenistan, Uzbekistan, Afghanistan and Pakistan. The proposal was widely discussed in the region's media, and also registered support in Washington, D.C., from U.S. Congressmen Sen. Steve Daines and Del. James Moylan and former diplomats Richard E. Hoagland and Robert F. Cekuta.

== New Lines Magazine ==
New Lines Magazine is an international affairs magazine published by the New Lines Institute. Founded and edited by Syrian-born American author and journalist Hassan Hassan, the magazine launched in 2020. It describes itself as "a local magazine for the world". Hassan told the Reuters Institute in 2021 that the magazine was launched in response to Western journalists’ reliance on outdated views of the Middle East, which pervades coverage of the region.

In September 2022, Hassan announced that the magazine was broadening its coverage to publish stories from around the world.

Harvard University’s Nieman Lab describes New Lines Magazine's mission as "to serve audiences that want to read long-form, narrative journalism," with an emphasis on "local reporting from journalists and experts". The magazine has included regular contributions from journalists Clarissa Ward, Arwa Damon and Hala Gorani, and public figures Robert Ford, Syrian intellectual Mustafa Khalifa and musician Alex Skolnick.

== Recognition and awards ==
In 2020, the institute was named one of the "best new think tanks" of 2020 in the University of Pennsylvania's annual ranking of think tanks, the Global Go To Think Tank Index.

New Lines Magazine won two awards in 2023 for its investigation of a massacre in the Syrian district of Tadamon. It won an award in the 'Popular features' category at the One World Media Awards and the Chair's Award at The Drum's Online Media Awards. One of its podcast episodes took silver in the 2024 Signal Awards. The magazine won an Online News Association award in 2025 for reporting on Indonesia’s nickel industry.

== Political stance ==
The On Think Tanks trade body describes New Lines Institute as a "nonpartisan think tank in Washington D.C."

== Funding ==
New Lines Institute says it receives funding from the Washington Institute for Education and Research, a 501(c)(3) nonprofit corporation registered in the District of Columbia for charitable and educational purposes.

The institute says it accepts research grants and charitable donations from US individuals, registered US legal entities, and the US government, but not from non-US governments or entities.
