= American Journal of Psychotherapy =

- Discipline: Psychotherapy
- Language: English

Publication details
- History: 1947–present
- Publisher: Lancaster, PA : Business Press; Ephrata, PA : Science Press
- Frequency: Quarterly

Standard abbreviations
- ISO 4: Am. J. Psychother.

Indexing
- ISSN: 0002-9564 (print); 2575-6559 (web)
- OCLC no.: 784262713

Links
- Journal homepage

The American Journal of Psychotherapy is the official psychotherapy journal of the American Psychiatric Association. It began publishing in 1947.

The Journal is published 4 times a year. Since 2001, it incorporates the Journal of Psychotherapy Practice and Research.

== Editors ==
The editor in chief emeritus is Toksöz Bayram Karasu, editor emeritus is Bruce J. Schwartz, M.D. The current editor in chief is Holly A. Swartz, M.D.; the managing editor is Demarie S. Jackson.

== See also ==
- List of psychotherapy journals
