= American Committee for East–West Accord =

Peace organization

The American Committee for East–West Accord is the name of two related organizations that have existed during separate periods of American history whose goals have been to promote, in the United States, conciliation with the Soviet Union and, later, the Russian Federation.

== Original organization (1974–1992) ==
The American Committee for East–West Accord was informally organized in 1974, and chartered three years later, in 1977. Founding members included George F. Kennan, Stephen F. Cohen, Jerome Wiesner, and Theodore Hesburgh. The group, which was composed of businessmen, journalists, academics, and former elected officials, advanced the position that "common sense" should determine U.S. trade policy with the USSR, specifically, that the U.S. should avoid economic boycotts and sanctions against the Soviet Union as such measures rarely worked. Instead, it argued, expanding American-Soviet trade would help advance the cause of détente. It also supported the Strategic Arms Limitation Talks (SALT), increased scientific and cultural exchanges with the Soviet Union, and less confrontational rhetoric about the USSR.

According to the committee, its underlying perspective was support for the "resolute abandonment of the stale slogans and reflexes of the Cold War ... and a determination not to be governed by the compulsions of military competition".

One of the committee's earliest activities was production of the film Survival ... or Suicide which presented a cinematic treatment of the effects nuclear war would have on daily life.

== Reestablished organization (2015–present) ==
American Committee for East–West Accord
- Abbreviation: ACEWA
- Formation: 2015
- Type: advocacy group
- Legal status: 501(c)(3) organization
- Headquarters: New York, NY, United States
- Founding Director: Stephen F. Cohen, Ph.D.
- Executive Editor: James Carden
- Website: eastwestaccord.com

=== History ===
Cohen reestablished the American Committee for East–West Accord in 2015 with the assistance of Gilbert Doctorow. A formal launch event was held in November of that year. In addition to Cohen and Doctorow, other members of the group's board of directors include Donald McHenry, William vanden Heuvel, Bill Bradley, Chuck Hagel, Jack F. Matlock Jr., and John E. Pepper, Jr. Doctorow subsequently resigned from the Board to pursue other interests. More recent Board members include Anna Eleanor Roosevelt (the granddaughter of Franklin and Eleanor Roosevelt) and Sharon Tennison.

The impetus for re-forming the committee was, according to its executive editor James Carden, due to its perception that "anyone who has had the temerity to question whether NATO’s relentless expansion eastward to Russia’s borders has contributed to the crisis [in Ukraine], can look forward to being labeled a 'useful idiot', a 'dupe', or a 'Kremlin apologist'. The trend towards character assassination in lieu of substantive debate has been one of the defining features of the debate over US–Russia policy".

=== Purpose ===
The organization was re-established with the intent of encouraging discussion and debate in the U.S. at a time when the United States has started drifting into a new Cold War with Russia.

=== Reaction ===
The committee has been endorsed by Paul Craig Roberts.

== See also ==
- Détente
- Russia–United States relations
- Committee on the Present Danger (another Cold War-era foreign policy advocacy group reestablished after a long hiatus)
