= NOW News =

Lebanese news website

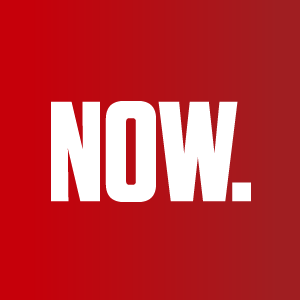
- Screenshot
- Website type: News, features, analysis, and much more
- Available in: English and Arabic
- Owner: M Publishing SAL
- Website: https://nowlebanon.com/
- Launched: 2012; 14 years ago

NOW News (sometimes abbreviated NOW, formerly NOW Lebanon) is a Beirut-based Lebanese news website focused on the Middle East founded in late 2012 and published in both English and Arabic by M Publishing SAL.

The site offers reports, news, features, and analysis on Lebanon, the Lebanese diaspora and the Middle East. The website offers minute-by-minute news updates as well as a special section and live blog on the civil war in Syria.

== History ==
On 14 March 2005 an estimated 1 million Lebanese took to the streets concentrated in Martyrs' Square, Beirut primarily to protest Syrian military occupation of Lebanon and Syrian intelligence and political domination of Lebanon since 1976. The mass mobilization was triggered by widespread unrest following accusations of Syrian involvement in the 14 February 2005 assassination of Lebanese Prime Minister Rafic Hariri.

The New Opinion Workshop (NOW) was created to provide news reports and opinion pieces as well as a digest of relevant news and opinion from a variety of media outlets. It aims to enable Lebanese citizens and the Lebanese diaspora to stay informed on a wide range of issues.

NOW News is the redesigned website that was known as "NOW Lebanon". The change came in late 2012 as the site's publisher decided to widen the scope of coverage to include the wider Middle East region.

NOW News has a large online readership mainly from the United States, Canada, European Union, and Australia.

Due to a financial crisis, the NOW website was taken down in December 2017.

On 15 June 2021, NOW Lebanon was officially put back online, but the old archives were lost due to the destruction of the main servers after the 2020 explosion.

== Contributors ==
Joumana Haddad, a Lebanese author and commentator.

Hussein Ibish, a senior fellow at the American Task Force on Palestine.

Michael Weiss, former director of communications at the Henry Jackson Society.

Tony Badran, a research fellow at the Foundation for Defense of Democracies.

Michael Young, opinion-page editor of The Daily Star.

== Staff ==
Publisher

M Publishing, Sal

Managing Editor

Hanin Ghaddar (English)
Alex Rowell (English)
Ana Maria Luca (English)

Production Editors

Ranya Radwan (English)
Saleh Hodeifi (Arabic)

News Desk Editors

Albin Szakola (English)
Liliana Mihaila (English)

Blog Editor

Liliana Mihaila (English)

Reporters

Alex Rowell
Ana Maria Luca
Myra Abdallah
Amin Nasr

Fixer

Myra Abdallah (English)
Amin Nasr (English)

== See also ==
- The Daily Star (Lebanon)
