= Hassan Hassan =

Syrian/American author and journalist (born 1982)

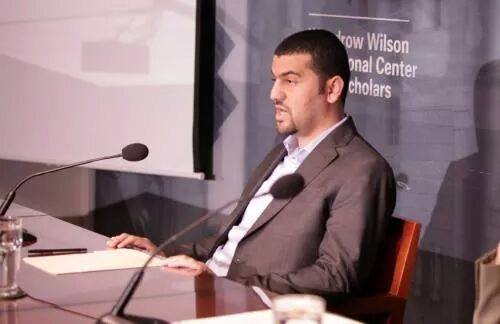
- Hassan discusses his work on extremism at the Wilson Center
- Born: 1982 (age 43–44); Al-Shaafah, Syria
- Education: University of Nottingham Damascus University
- Occupations: Author, journalist, scholar

Hassan Hassan (born 1982) is an American author and journalist of Syrian origin. He co-wrote the 2015 New York Times bestseller ISIS: Inside the Army of Terror with Michael Weiss. He has written on Islamist groups in the Middle East. He has appeared on The O'Reilly Factor, Amanpour and The Last Word with Lawrence O'Donnell, and has written for The New York Times, Foreign Policy, The Guardian, The Atlantic, Foreign Affairs, Financial Times, and The Daily Beast. Hassan is the founder and editor-in-chief of New Lines Magazine, a global affairs magazine.

== Background ==
Hassan is from the town of Al-Shaafah in Al-Bukamal District, Deir ez-Zor Governorate, in eastern Syria, near the Iraqi border.

In 2000, he moved to Damascus to study English literature at Damascus University. In 2006, he moved to the United Kingdom, where he completed an MA in International relations at the University of Nottingham.

== Career ==
=== Journalism ===
After graduation, Hassan moved to the United Arab Emirates in 2008 to work as a news reporter for the then newly-launched English-language daily The National newspaper in Abu Dhabi, covering domestic and Gulf affairs. After the onset of the Arab Spring uprisings, he joined its opinion section as a weekly columnist, and later became the department’s deputy editor.

Hassan covered the Syrian conflict since the uprising began in 2011. His research on the Islamic State of Iraq and Syria (ISIS) included extensive interviews with members of the organization since its rise in his home region in June 2014.

After moving to Washington, D.C., in 2016, Hassan continued writing for The National, and was also a regular contributing writer to The Atlantic. Hassan has written for The Guardian, the New York Times, the Financial Times, Foreign Policy, Foreign Affairs and the Daily Beast.

=== Academia ===
In Washington, D.C., Hassan has been involved in policy research, in parallel to his journalistic work. He specialized in the study of Sunni and Shia militant organizations, as well as Iraq, Syria, and the Persian Gulf.

His research was commissioned by Carnegie Endowment for International Peace, European Council on Foreign Relations, Chatham House, Royal United Services Institute, Brookings Institution, and University of Oxford's Gulf studies forum.

He previously worked as an associate fellow at Chatham House, a senior fellow at the Tahrir Institute for Middle East Policy, a senior researcher at George Washington University, and a director at the Center for Global Policy. He was also a research associate at the Delma Institute in the United Arab Emirates. In 2019, Hassan Hassan left George Washington University after Lorenzo Vidino tried to prevent him from publishing an article about the murder of Jamal Khashoggi. After the article was nevertheless published, Vidino reportedly contacted the editorial team at The Atlantic and requested that any mention of Hassan’s employer be removed from his author biography—particularly in articles that were critical of Saudi Arabia and the United Arab Emirates.

Hassan is a director at the New Lines Institute for Strategy and Policy, a think tank in Washington D.C.

=== Testifying in Congress ===
Hassan has advised officials in the United States and the Middle East. In June 2016, Hassan testified before the US Senate Homeland Security and Governmental Affairs Committee on the extremist ideology of ISIS, a widely covered hearing. In February 2017, he testified before the House Foreign Affairs Committee on defeating terrorism in Syria.

== Publications ==
=== Books ===
In 2015, Hassan authored a book with Michael Weiss on the rise of the militant group ISIS, titled ISIS: Inside the Army of Terror. His book was chosen by The Wall Street Journal as one of 10 must-read works on the evolution of terrorism in the Middle East, one of the London Times' Best Books of 2015, and The New York Times Editors' Choice in April 2015. The book was reviewed favorably twice in The New York Times, The Guardian, and The Wall Street Journal. The Times' chief book critic, Michiko Kakutani, said the book gave readers "a fine-grained look at the organization’s evolution through assorted incarnations." It has been translated into over a dozen languages.

On December 24, 2019, Hassan published his translation of a speech of Ahmed al-Sharaa, the commander-in-chief of the Syrian militant group Tahrir al-Sham, the successor organisation of the Syrian branch of al-Qaeda.

=== New Lines Magazine ===
Hassan founded New Lines Magazine, a global affairs magazine, in October 2020. Since then, he has acted as its editor-in-chief.
