= Journal of the American Psychoanalytic Association =

- Discipline: Psychoanalysis
- Language: English
- Edited by: Gregory Rizzolo

Publication details
- History: 1953–present
- Publisher: SAGE Publishing (United States)
- Frequency: Bimonthly
- Impact factor: 1.2 (2022)

Standard abbreviations
- ISO 4: J. Am. Psychoanal. Assoc.

Indexing
- ISSN: 0003-0651 (print); 1941-2460 (web)
- LCCN: 55030114
- OCLC no.: 494820497

Links
- Journal homepage; Online access; Online archive

The Journal of the American Psychoanalytic Association is a bimonthly peer-reviewed healthcare journal covering all aspects of psychoanalysis and is the official journal of the American Psychoanalytic Association. The editor-in-chief is Gregory Rizzolo.

== Abstracting and indexing ==
The journal is abstracted and indexed in Scopus and the Social Sciences Citation Index. According to the Journal Citation Reports, the journal has a 2022 impact factor of x.x.

== See also ==
- List of psychotherapy journals
