= The American Journal of Psychoanalysis =

- Discipline: Psychoanalysis
- Language: English
- Edited by: Giselle Galdi

Publication details
- History: 1941–present
- Publisher: Palgrave Macmillan (United States)
- Frequency: Quarterly

Standard abbreviations
- ISO 4: Am. J. Psychoanal.

Indexing
- CODEN: AJPYA8
- ISSN: 0002-9548 (print); 1573-6741 (web)
- LCCN: 49032980
- OCLC no.: 1355186

Links
- Journal homepage; Online archive

The American Journal of Psychoanalysis is a healthcare journal covering psychoanalysis.

== Abstracting and indexing ==
The American Journal of Psychoanalysis is abstracted and indexed in Scopus.

== See also ==
- List of psychotherapy journals
