= Basic anxiety =

Basic anxiety is a term used by psychoanalytic theorist Karen Horney. She believed that neurosis resulted from basic anxiety caused by interpersonal relationships. Her theory proposes that strategies used to cope with anxiety can be overused, causing them to take on the appearance of needs. According to Horney, basic anxiety (and therefore neurosis) could result from a variety of things, including "direct or indirect domination, indifference, erratic behavior, lack of respect for the child's individual needs, lack of real guidance, disparaging attitudes, too much admiration or the absence of it, lack of reliable warmth, having to take sides in parental disagreements, too much or too little responsibility, over-protection, isolation from other children, injustice, discrimination, unkept promises, hostile atmosphere, and so on and so on."

Karen Horney was born in September 1885 in Germany. Her father wanted her to stay home and not attend school; however, Horney wanted to pursue graduate school, even though no German universities admitted women at that time. She would eventually pursue research on basic anxiety. Basic anxiety is the feeling of being helpless, small, and insignificant, because of abuse and/or neglect. Horney's definition of basic anxiety explains that basic hostility may lead to basic anxiety, and vice versa.

Horney shared with Freud a belief that personality develops in the early childhood years, but she insisted that personality continues to change throughout life. Whereas Freud detailed psychosexual stages of development, Horney focused on how the growing child is treated by parents and caregivers. She denied universal developmental phases, such as an oral or anal stage. She suggested that if a child developed tendencies toward an oral or anal personality, these tendencies were a result of parental behaviors. Nothing in a child's development was universal; everything depended on social, cultural, and environmental factors.

== How people deal with basic anxiety ==
Initially Horney listed 10 neurotic needs, including affection, achievement, and self-sufficiency. In later writings she grouped the neurotic needs into three trends or dimensions.

=== Moving away from people ===
The detached personality – one who needs to move away from people, expressing needs for independence, perfection and withdrawal. Moving away from people is characterized by people who behave in a detached manner. These are people who adopt a neurotic trend of purposely wanting to be left out.

=== Moving toward people ===
The compliant personality – one who needs to move toward other people, expressing needs for approval, affection and a dominant partner

=== Moving against people ===
The aggressive personality – one who needs to move against people, expressing needs for power, exploitation, prestige, admiration, and achievement. This person trusts no one. They think all people are out to get them and hostile. They believe that people are not good. These people are generally bullies. They are characterized by being very tough, and are motivated by a strong need to exploit others.

Accepting one’s own feelings of vulnerability and dependence demonstrates the act of movement toward people. Moving toward people is the only way a person can feel secure. Movement away from people involves withdrawing, behaving so as to appear self-sufficient and avoid dependency. Movement against people involves hostility, rebellion, and aggression. Behaving in a way that exemplifies these traits is not a healthy way to deal with anxiety. Once establishing a behavioral strategy for coping with basic anxiety, this pattern ceases to be flexible enough to permit alternative behaviors.

Although there are a considerable amount of negative impulses for basic anxiety there are also normal impulses which are positive responses to basic anxiety.

=== Normal defenses ===
- Moving toward people in a friendly, loving way. Seeking attachment.
  - Examples—finding spouse, supporting one's community, supporting family, being a part of a team
- Moving against people in a competitive non-harmful way. (Darwinism)
  - Example—trying to be the best at work
- Moving away from people in order to feel more independent and self-sufficient. (autonomy)

== 10 neurotic needs ==
To Horney, then, basic anxiety arises from the parent-child relationship. When this socially produced anxiety becomes evident, the child develops behavior strategies in response to parental behavior as a way of coping with the accompanying feelings of helplessness and insecurity. If any one of the child's behavioral strategies becomes a fixed part of the personality, it is called a neurotic need, which is a way of defending against the anxiety.

The Neurotic Need for Affection and Approval
This need includes the longings to be liked. People demonstrating this need try to appease others and work hard to meet the expectations of others. This type of need is exceedingly sensitive to rejection. This need does not deal with anger of others or criticism very well.
The Neurotic Need for a Partner Who Will Take Over One’s Life
This need is fairly self-explanatory. This need can overtake one’s relationships because they have a fear of being abandoned. It can be detrimental to a relationship because individuals place an extravagant significance on the couple or partner; and believe that having a partner will resolve all of life’s troubles.
The Neurotic Need to Restrict One’s Life Within Narrow Borders
Individuals demonstrating this need are very introverted. They want to go through life unnoticed. They need little and demand little. A person exemplifying this need thinks little of their own talents and does not wish for greater things.
The Neurotic Need for Power
Individuals with this need are power hungry. They usually seek to gain strength and have no problem getting it at the cost of others. These individuals are not sympathetic towards weakness and they do not understand personal limitations or helplessness. This person likes to be in control.
The Neurotic Need to Exploit Others
These individuals use others for their own benefit and gain. They pride themselves in their ability to manipulate others in order to obtain desired objectives. Desired objectives of this neurotic need include such things as power, money, or sex.
The Neurotic Need for Prestige
Individuals with a need for prestige are constantly seeking of public recognition and acclaim. These individuals often fear public embarrassment and loss of social status. They evaluate their prestige by material possessions and professional accomplishments.
The Neurotic Need for Personal Admiration
Individuals with a neurotic need for personal admiration have an exaggerated self-perception and are narcissistic. They are constantly seeking admiration based on the image of self-view.
The Neurotic Need for Personal Achievement
According to Horney, people push themselves to achieve greater and greater things as a result of basic insecurity. Individuals with a neurotic need for personal achievement feel a constant need to accomplish more than other people. They are also in competition with themselves.
The Neurotic Need for Self-Sufficiency and Independence
Individuals with this neurotic need distance themselves from others. They have a fear of being tied down or dependent upon another person. People with this exhibit a "loner" mentality.
The Neurotic Need for Perfection and Unassailability
Individuals with this neurotic need are obsessed with perfection. They find flaws within themselves and quickly try to fix them as to appear perfect to others.

Karen Horney founded one of the best known theories of neurosis and, if not for her, Basic anxiety would not be a classified disorder. When a fixed behavior proves inappropriate for a particular situation, we are unable to change in response to the demands of the situation. These entrenched behaviors intensify a person's difficulties, because they affect their personality, their relations with other people and with themselves, and with life as a whole.

== Sources ==
- Horney, Karen (1 March 1968). "The technique of psychoanalytic therapy". The American Journal of Psychoanalysis. 28 (1): 3–12. doi:10.1007/BF01873614. PMID 5650296. S2CID 32572789.
- Horney, Karen (1942). Self-analysis. W.W. Norton & Co. OCLC 1036858496.
- Horney, Karen (1945). Our inner conflicts a constructive theory of neurosis. OCLC 1185487612.
- Horney, Karen (1980). The adolescent diaries of Karen Horney. Basic Books. OCLC 1145793849.
- O'Connel, Agnes N. (1990). "Karen Horney (1885–1952)". In O'Connell, Agnes N.; Russo, Nancy Felipe (eds.). Women in Psychology: A Bio-bibliographic Sourcebook. Greenwood Publishing Group. pp. 184–190. ISBN 978-0-313-26091-9.
- Schultz, Duane P.; Schultz, Sydney Ellen (2015). A History of Modern Psychology. Cengage Learning. ISBN 978-1-305-54891-6.
