= Timeline of psychology =

This article is a general timeline of psychology.

== Ancient history – BCE ==
- c. 1550 BCE – The Ebers Papyrus mentioned depression and thought disorders.
- c. 600 BCE – Many cities in Greece had temples to Asklepios that provided cures for psychosomatic illnesses.
- 540–475 Heraclitus
- c. 500 Alcmaeon – suggested theory of humors as regulating human behavior (similar to Empedocles' elements)
- 500–428 Anaxagoras
- 490–430 Empedocles proposed a first natural, non-religious system of factors that create things around, including human characters. In his model he used four elements (water, fire, earth, air) and four seasons to derive diversity of natural systems.
- 490–421 Protagoras
- 470–399 Socrates – Socrates has been called the father of western philosophy, if only via his influence on Plato and Aristotle. Socrates made a major contribution to pedagogy via his dialectical method and to epistemology via his definition of true knowledge as true belief buttressed by some rational justification.
- 470–370 Democritus – Democritus distinguished between insufficient knowledge gained through the senses and legitimate knowledge gained through the intellect—an early stance on epistemology.
- 460 BC – 370 BCE – Hippocrates introduced principles of scientific medicine based upon naturalistic observation and logic, and denied the influence of spirits and demons in diseases. Introduced the concept of "temperamentum"("mixture", i.e. 4 temperament types based on a ratio between chemical bodily systems. Hippocrates was among the first physicians to argue that brain, and not the heart is the organ of psychic processes.
- 387 BCE – Plato suggested that the brain is the seat of mental processes. Plato's view of the "soul" (self) is that the body exists to serve the soul: "God created the soul before the body and gave it precedence both in time and value, and made it the dominating and controlling partner." from Timaeus
- c. 350 BCE – Aristotle wrote on the psuchê (soul) in De Anima, first mentioning the tabula rasa concept of the mind.
- c. 340 BCE – Praxagoras
- 371–288 Theophrastus
- 341–270 Epicurus
- c. 320 Herophilus
- c. 300–30 Zeno of Citium taught the philosophy of Stoicism, involving logic and ethics. In logic, he distinguished between imperfect knowledge offered by the senses and superior knowledge offered by reason. In ethics, he taught that virtue lay in reason and vice in rejection of reason. Stoicism inspired Aaron Beck to introduce cognitive behavioral therapy in the 1970s.
- 304–250 Erasistratus
- 123–43 BCE – Themison of Laodicea was a pupil of Asclepiades of Bithynia and founded a school of medical thought known as "methodism." He was criticized by Soranus for his cruel handling of mental patients. Among his prescriptions were darkness, restraint by chains, and deprivation of food and drink. Juvenal satirized him and suggested that he killed more patients than he cured.
- c. 100 BCE – The Dead Sea Scrolls noted the division of human nature into two temperaments.

== 1st–5th century CE ==
- c. 50 – Aulus Cornelius Celsus died, leaving De Medicina, a medical encyclopedia; Book 3 covers mental diseases. The term insania, insanity, was first used by him. The methods of treatment included bleeding, frightening the patient, emetics, enemas, total darkness, and decoctions of poppy or henbane, and pleasant ones such as music therapy, travel, sport, reading aloud, and massage. He was aware of the importance of the doctor-patient relationship.
- c. 100 – Rufus of Ephesus believed that the nervous system was instrumental in voluntary movement and sensation. He discovered the optic chiasma by anatomical studies of the brain. He stressed taking a history of both physical and mental disorders. He gave a detailed account of melancholia, and was quoted by Galen.
- 93–138 – Soranus of Ephesus advised kind treatment in healthy and comfortable conditions, including light, warm rooms.
- c. 130–200 – Galen "was schooled in all the psychological systems of the day: Platonic, Aristotelian, Stoic, and Epicurean" He advanced medicine by offering anatomic investigations and was a skilled physician. Galen developed further the theory of temperaments suggested by Hippocrates, that people's characters were determined by the balance among four bodily substances. He also distinguished sensory from motor nerves and showed that the brain controls the muscles.
- c. 150–200 – Aretaeus of Cappadocia
- 155–220 Tertullian
- 205–270 Plotinus wrote Enneads a systematic account of Neoplatonist philosophy, also nature of visual perception and how memory might work.
- c. 323–403 – Oribasius compiled medical writings based on the works of Aristotle, Asclepiades, and Soranus of Ephesus, and wrote on melancholia in Galenic terms.
- 345–399 – Evagrius Ponticus described a rigorous way of introspection within the early Christian monastic tradition. Through introspection, monks could acquire self-knowledge and control their stream of thought which signified potentially demonic influences. Ponticus developed this view in Praktikos, his guide to ascetic life.
- c. 390 – Nemesius wrote De Natura Hominis (On Human Nature); large sections were incorporated in Saint John Damascene's De Fide Orthodoxia in the eighth century. Nemesius' book De Placitis Hippocratis et Platonis (On the Doctrines of Hippocrates and Plato) contains many passages concerning Galen's anatomy and physiology, believing that different cavities of the brain were responsible for different functions.
- 397–398 – St. Augustine of Hippo published Confessions, which anticipated Freud by near-discovery of the subconscious. Augustine's most complete account of the soul is in De Quantitate Animae (The Greatness of the Soul). The work assumes a Platonic model of the soul.
- 5th century – Caelius Aurelianus opposed harsh methods of handling the insane, and advocated humane treatment.
- c. 423–529 – Theodosius the Cenobiarch founded a monastery at Kathismus, near Bethlehem. Three hospitals were built by the side of the monastery: one for the sick, one for the aged, and one for the insane.
- c. 451 – Patriarch Nestorius of Constantinople: his followers dedicated themselves to the sick and became physicians of great repute. They brought the works of Hippocrates, Aristotle, and Galen, and influenced the approach to physical and mental disorders in Persia and Arabia

== 6th–10th century ==
- 625–690 – Paul of Aegina suggested that hysteria should be treated by ligature of the limbs, and mania by tying the patient to a mattress placed inside a wicker basket and suspended from the ceiling. He also recommended baths, wine, special diets, and sedatives for the mentally ill. He described the following mental disorders: phrenitis, delirium, lethargus, melancholia, mania, incubus, lycanthropy, and epilepsy
- c. 800 – The first bimaristan was built in Baghdad. By the 13th century, bimaristans grew into hospitals with specialized wards, including wards for mentally ill patients.
- c. 850 – Ali ibn Sahl Rabban al-Tabari wrote a work emphasizing the need for psychotherapy.
- c. 900 – Ahmed ibn Sahl al-Balkhi urged doctors to ensure that they evaluated the state of both their patients' bodies and souls, and highlighted the link between spiritual or mental health and overall health.
- c. 900 – al-Razi (Rhazes) promoted psychotherapy and an understanding attitude towards those with psychological distress.

== 11th–15th century ==
- 1025 – In The Canon of Medicine, Avicenna described a number of conditions, including hallucination, insomnia, mania, nightmare, melancholia, dementia, epilepsy, paralysis, stroke, vertigo and tremor.
- c. 1030 – Al-Biruni employed an experimental method in examining the concept of reaction time.
- c. 1180 – 1245 Alexander of Hales
- c. 1190 – 1249 William of Auvergne
- c. 1200 – Maimonides wrote about neuropsychiatric disorders, and described rabies and belladonna intoxication.
- 1215–1277 Peter Juliani taught in the medical faculty of the University of Siena, and wrote on medical, philosophical and psychological topics. He was personal physician to Pope Gregory X and later became archbishop and cardinal. He was elected pope under the name John XXI in 1276.
- c. 1214 – 1294 Roger Bacon advocated for empirical methods and wrote on optics, visual perception, and linguistics.
- 1221–1274 Bonaventure
- 1193–1280 Albertus Magnus
- 1225 – Thomas Aquinas
- 1240 – Bartholomeus Anglicus published De Proprietatibus Rerum, which included a dissertation on the brain, recognizing that mental disorders can have a physical or psychological cause.
- 1247 – Bethlehem Royal Hospital in Bishopsgate outside the wall of London, one of the most famous old psychiatric hospitals was founded as a priory of the Order of St. Mary of Bethlem to collect alms for Crusaders; after the English government secularized it, it started admitting mental patients by 1377 (c. 1403), becoming known as Bedlam Hospital; in 1547 it was acquired by the City of London, operating until 1948; it is now part of the British NHS Foundation Trust.
- 1266–1308 Duns Scotus
- c. 1270 – Witelo wrote Perspectiva, a work on optics containing speculations on psychology, nearly discovering the subconscious.
- 1295 Lanfranc of Milan writes Science of Cirurgie
- 1317–1340 – William of Ockham, an English Franciscan friar and scholastic philosopher and theologian, is commonly known for Occam's razor, the methodological principle that the simplest explanation is to be preferred. He also produced significant works on logic, physics, and theology, advancing his thoughts about intuitive and abstracted knowledge.
- c. 1375 – English authorities regarded mental illness as demonic possession, treating it with exorcism and torture.
- c. 1400 – Renaissance Humanism caused a reawakening of ancient knowledge of science and medicine.
- 1433–1499 Marsilio Ficino was a renowned figure of the Italian Renaissance, a Neoplatonist humanist, a translator of Greek philosophical writing, and the most influential exponent of Platonism in Italy in the fifteenth century.
- c. 1450 – The pendulum in Europe swings, bringing witch mania, causing thousands of women to be executed for witchcraft until the late 17th century.

== 16th century ==
- 1590 – Scholastic philosopher Rudolph Goclenius coined the term "psychology"; though usually regarded as the origin of the term, there is evidence that it was used at least six decades earlier by Marko Marulić.

== 17th century ==
- c. 1600–1625 – Francis Bacon was an English philosopher, statesman, scientist, lawyer, jurist, author, and pioneer of the scientific method. His writings on psychological topics included the nature of knowledge and memory.
- 1650 – René Descartes died, leaving Treatise of the World, containing his dualistic theory of reality, mind vs. matter.
- 1672 – Thomas Willis published the anatomical treatise De Anima Brutorum, describing psychology in terms of brain function.
- 1677 – Baruch Spinoza died, leaving Ethics, Demonstrated in Geometrical Order, Pt. 2 focusing on the human mind and body, disputing Descartes and arguing that they are one, and Pt. 3 attempting to show that moral concepts such as good and evil, virtue, and perfection have a basis in human psychology.
- 1689 – John Locke published An Essay Concerning Human Understanding, which claims that the human mind is a Tabula Rasa at birth.

== 18th century ==
- 1701 – Gottfried Wilhelm Leibniz published the Law of Continuity, which he applied to psychology, becoming the first to postulate an unconscious mind; he also introduced the concept of threshold.
- 1710 – George Berkeley published Treatise Concerning the Principles of Human Knowledge, which claims that the outside world is composed solely of ideas.
- 1732 – Christian Wolff published Psychologia Empirica, followed in 1734 by Psychologia Rationalis, popularizing the term "psychology".
- 1739 – David Hume published A Treatise of Human Nature, claiming that all contents of mind are solely built from sense experiences.
- 1781 – Immanuel Kant published Critique of Pure Reason, rejecting Hume's extreme empiricism and proposing that there is more to knowledge than bare sense experience, distinguishing between "a posteriori" and "a priori" knowledge, the former being derived from perception, hence occurring after perception, and the latter being a property of thought, independent of experience and existing before experience.
- 1783 – Ferdinand Ueberwasser designated himself Professor of Empirical Psychology and Logic at the Old University of Münster; four years later, he published the comprehensive textbook Instructions for the regular study of empirical psychology for candidates of philosophy at the University of Münster which complemented his lectures on scientific psychology.
- 1798 – Immanuel Kant proposed the first dimensional model of consistent individual differences by mapping the four Hippocrates' temperament types into dimensions of emotionality and energetic arousal. These two dimensions later became an essential part of all temperament and personality models.

== 19th century ==
=== 1800s ===
- c. 1800 – Franz Joseph Gall developed cranioscopy, the measurement of the skull to determine psychological characteristics, which was later renamed phrenology; it is now discredited.
- 1807 – Georg Wilhelm Friedrich Hegel published Phenomenology of Spirit (Mind), which describes his thesis-antithesis-synthesis dialectical method, according to which knowledge pushes forwards to greater certainty, and ultimately towards knowledge of the noumenal world.
- 1808 – Johann Christian Reil coined the term "psychiatry".

=== 1810s ===
- 1812 – Benjamin Rush became one of the earliest advocates of humane treatment for the mentally ill with the publication of Medical Inquiries and Observations Upon Diseases of the Mind, the first American textbook on psychiatry.

=== 1820s ===
- 1829 – John Stuart Mill's father James Mill published Analysis of the Phenomena of the Human Mind (2 vols.).

=== 1840s ===
- 1840 – Frederick Augustus Rauch (1806–1841) published Psychology, or a View of the Human Soul, including Anthropology
- 1843 – Forbes Benignus Winslow (1810–1874) published The Plea of Insanity in Criminal Cases, helping establish the plea of insanity in criminal cases in Britain.
- 1844 – Søren Kierkegaard The Concept of Anxiety, the first exposition on anxiety.
- 1848 – Vermont railroad worker Phineas Gage had a 3-foot rod driven through his brain and jaw in an explosives accident, permanently changing his personality, revolutionizing scientific opinion about brain functions being localizable.
- 1849 – Søren Kierkegaard published The Sickness Unto Death.

=== 1850s ===
- 1852 – Hermann Lotze published Medical Psychology or Physiology of the Soul.
- 1856 – Hermann Lotze began publishing his 3-volume magnum opus Mikrokosmos (1856–64), arguing that natural laws of inanimate objects apply to human minds and bodies but have the function of enabling us to aim for the values set by the deity, thus making room for aesthetics.
- 1859 – Pierre Briquet published Traite Clinique et Therapeutique de L'Hysterie.

=== 1860s ===
- 1860s – Franciscus Donders first used human reaction time to infer differences in cognitive processing.
- 1860 – Gustav Theodor Fechner published Elements of Psychophysics, founding the subject of psychophysics.
- 1861 – Paul Broca discovered an area in the left cerebral hemisphere that is important for speech production, now known as Broca's area, founding neuropsychology.
- 1869 – Francis Galton published Hereditary Genius, arguing for eugenics. He went on to found psychometrics, differential psychology, and the lexical hypothesis of personality.

=== 1870s ===
- 1872 – Douglas Spalding published his discovery of psychological imprinting.
- 1874 – Wilhelm Wundt published Grundzüge der physiologischen Psychologie (Principles of Physiological Psychology), the first textbook of experimental psychology.
- 1878 – G. Stanley Hall was awarded the first PhD on a psychological topic from Harvard (in philosophy).
- 1879 – Wilhelm Wundt opened the first experimental psychology laboratory at the University of Leipzig in Germany.

=== 1880s ===
- 1882 – The Society for Psychical Research was founded in England.
- 1883 – G. Stanley Hall opened the first American experimental psychology research laboratory at Johns Hopkins University.
- 1883 – Emil Kraepelin published Compendium der Psychiatrie.
- 1884 – Ivan Pavlov began studying the digestive secretion of animals.
- 1884 – Tourette's Syndrome was first described.
- 1885 – Hermann Ebbinghaus published Über das Gedächtnis (On Memory), a groundbreaking work based on self-experiments, first describing the learning curve, forgetting curve, and spacing effect.
- 1886 – John Dewey published the first American textbook on psychology, titled Psychology.
- 1886 – Vladimir Bekhterev established the first laboratory of experimental psychology in Russia at Kazan University.
- 1886 – Sigmund Freud began private practice in Vienna.
- 1887 – Georg Elias Müller opened the 2nd German experimental psychology research laboratory in Göttingen.
- 1887 – George Trumbull Ladd (Yale) published Elements of Physiological Psychology, the first American textbook to include a substantial amount of information on the new experimental form of the discipline.
- 1887 – James McKeen Cattell founded an experimental psychology laboratory at the University of Pennsylvania, the 3rd in the United States.
- 1887 – G. Stanley Hall founded the American Journal of Psychology with a $500 contribution supplied by Robert Pearsall Smith of the American Society for Psychical Research.
- 1888 – William Lowe Bryan founded the United States' 4th experimental psychology laboratory at Indiana University.
- 1888 – Joseph Jastrow founded the United States' 5th experimental psychology laboratory at the University of Wisconsin–Madison.
- 1888 – G. Stanley Hall left Johns Hopkins for the presidency of the newly founded Clark University in Worcester, Massachusetts
- 1889 – James Mark Baldwin published the first volume of his Handbook of Psychology, titled "Sense and Intellect".
- 1889 – Edmund Sanford, a former student of G. Stanley Hall founded the United States' 6th experimental psychology laboratory at Clark University.
- 1889 – Edward Cowles founded the United States' 7th experimental psychology laboratory at the McLean Asylum in Waverley, Massachusetts
- 1889 – Harry Kirke Wolfe founded the United States' 8th experimental psychology laboratory at the University of Nebraska.

=== 1890s ===
- 1890 – Christian von Ehrenfels published On the Qualities of Form, founding Gestalt psychology.
- 1890 – William James published The Principles of Psychology.
- 1890 – James Hayden Tufts founded the United States' 9th experimental psychology laboratory at the University of Michigan.
- 1890 – G. T. W. Patrick founded the United States' 10th experimental psychology laboratory at the University of Iowa.
- 1890 – James McKeen Cattell left Pennsylvania for Columbia University where he founded the United States' 11th experimental psychology laboratory.
- 1890 – James Mark Baldwin founded the first permanent experimental psychology laboratory in the British Empire at the University of Toronto.
- 1891 – Frank Angell founded the United States' 12th experimental psychology laboratory at the Cornell University.
- 1891 – Edvard Westermarck described the Westermarck effect, where people raised early in life in close domestic proximity later become desensitized to close sexual attraction, raising theories about the incest taboo.
- 1892 – G. Stanley Hall et al. founded the American Psychological Association (APA).
- 1892 – Edward Bradford Titchener took a professorship at Cornell University, replacing Frank Angell who left for Stanford University.
- 1892 – Edward Wheeler Scripture founded the experimental psychology laboratory at Yale University, the 19th in United States.
- 1892–1893 – Charles A. Strong opened the experimental psychology laboratory at the University of Chicago, the 20th in the United States, at which James Rowland Angell conducted the first experiments of functionalism in 1896.
- 1894 – Margaret Floy Washburn was the first woman to be granted a PhD in Psychology after she studied under E. B. Titchener at Cornell University.
- 1894 – James McKeen Cattell and James Mark Baldwin founded the Psychological Review to compete with Hall's American Journal of Psychology.
- 1895 – Gustave Le Bon published The Crowd: A Study of the Popular Mind.
- 1896 – John Dewey published the paper The Reflex Arc Concept in Psychology, founding functionalism.
- 1896 – The first psychological clinic was opened at the University of Pennsylvania by Lightner Witmer; although often celebrated as marking the birth of clinical psychology, it was focused primarily on educational matters.
- 1896 – Edward B. Titchener, student of Wilhelm Wundt and originator of the terms "structuralism" and "functionalism" published An Outline of Psychology.
- 1897 – Havelock Ellis published Sexual Inversion.
- 1898 – Boris Sidis published The Psychology of Suggestion: A Research into the Subconscious Nature of Man and Society.
- 1899 – On 4 November Sigmund Freud published The Interpretation of Dreams (Die Traumdeutung), marking the beginning of psychoanalysis, which attempts to deal with the Oedipal complex.

== 20th century ==
=== 1900s ===
- 1900 – Sigmund Freud published The Psychopathology of Everyday Life.
- 1903 – John B. Watson graduated from the University of Chicago; his dissertation on rat behavior has been described as a "classic of developmental psychobiology" by historian of psychology Donald Dewsbury.
- 1903 – Helen Thompson Woolley published her doctoral dissertation, The Mental Traits of Sex, for which she had conducted the first experimental test of sex differences.
- 1904 – Ivan Pavlov won the Nobel Prize for his studies of conditioning. This was the first Prize given for research adopted by psychologists.
- 1904 – Charles Spearman published the article General Intelligence in the American Journal of Psychology, introducing the g factor theory of intelligence.
- 1905- Mary Calkins was the first woman elected president of the American Psychological Association.
- 1905 – Alfred Binet and Theodore Simon created the Binet-Simon scale to identify students needing extra help, marking the beginning of standardized psychological testing.
- 1905 – Edward Thorndike published the law of effect.
- 1905 – Sigmund Freud published Three Essays on the Theory of Sexuality.
- 1906 – The Journal of Abnormal Psychology was founded by Morton Prince, for which Boris Sidis was an associate editor and significant contributor.
- 1908 – Sigmund Freud published the paper On the Sexual Theories of Children, introducing the concept of penis envy; he also published the paper 'Civilized' Sexual Morality and Modern Nervous Illness.
- 1908 – Wilfred Trotter published the first paper explaining the herd instinct.
- 1909 – Sigmund Freud lectured at Clark University, winning over the U.S. establishment.

=== 1910s ===
- 1910 – Sigmund Freud founded the International Psychoanalytical Association (IPA), with Carl Jung as the first president, and Otto Rank as the first secretary.
- 1910 – Grace Helen Kent and J. Rosanoff published the Kent-Rosanoff Free Association Test
- 1910 – Boris Sidis opened the private Sidis Psychotherapeutic Institute at Maplewood Farms in Portsmouth, New Hampshire for the treatment of nervous patients using the latest scientific methods.
- 1911 – Alfred Adler left Freud's Psychoanalytic Group to form his own school of thought, accusing Freud of overemphasizing sexuality and basing his theory on his own childhood.
- 1911 – The American Psychoanalytic Association (APsaA) was founded.
- 1911 – William McDougall, founder of Hormic Psychology published Body and Mind: A History and Defence of Animism, claiming that there is an animating principle in Nature and that the mind guides evolution.
- 1912 – Max Wertheimer published Experimental Studies of the Perception of Movement, helping found Gestalt Psychology
- 1913 – Carl Jung developed his own theories, which became known as Analytical Psychology.
- 1913 – Jacob L. Moreno pioneered group psychotherapy methods in Vienna, which emphasized spontaneity and interaction; they later became known as psychodrama and sociometry.
- 1913 – John B. Watson published Psychology as the Behaviorist Views It, sometimes known as "The Behaviorist Manifesto".
- 1913 – Hugo Münsterberg published Psychology and Industrial Efficiency, considered today as the first book on Industrial and Organizational Psychology.
- 1914 – Boris Sidis published The Foundations of Normal and Abnormal Psychology, where he provided the scientific foundation for the field of psychology, and detailed his theory of the moment consciousness.
- 1917 – Sigmund Freud published Introduction to Psychoanalysis.

=== 1920s ===
- 1920 – John B. Watson and his assistant Rosalie Rayner conducted the Little Albert experiment, using classical conditioning to make a young boy afraid of white rats.
- 1921 – Sigmund Freud published Group Psychology and the Analysis of the Ego.
- 1921 – Jacob L. Moreno conducted the first large scale public psychodrama session at the Komedienhaus in Vienna; he moved to New York in 1925.
- 1921 – Melanie Klein began to develop her technique of analyzing children.
- 1922 – Karen Horney began publishing a series of 14 papers (last in 1937) questioning Freud's theories on women, founding feminist psychology.
- 1922 – Boris Sidis published Nervous Ills: Their Cause and a Cure, a popularization of his work concerning the subconscious and the treatment of psychopathic disease.
- 1923 – Sigmund Freud published The Ego and the Id.
- 1924 – Jacob Robert Kantor founded interbehavioral psychology based on John Dewey's psychology and Albert Einstein's relativity theory.
- 1924 – Otto Rank published The Trauma of Birth, coining the term "pre-Oedipal". Freud had originally praised him for such, but changed his stance and as such caused their falling out.
- 1926 – Otto Rank gave the lecture "The Genesis of the Object Relation", founding object relations theory.
- 1927 – Ivan Pavlov published Conditioned Reflexes, containing his theory of classical conditioning.
- 1928 – Jean Piaget published Judgment and Reasoning in the Child.
- 1928 – Shoma Morita published Morita Therapy: The True Nature of Shinkeishitsu (Anxiety-based Disorders), which contains his peripheral theory of consciousness, while noting Freud's theory of the unconscious. (Translation by A. Kondo, Edited by P. LeVine in 1998, SUNY Press)
- 1929 – Edwin Boring published A History of Experimental Psychology, pioneering the history of psychology.
- 1929 – Lev Vygotsky founded cultural-historical psychology.

=== 1930s ===
- 1930 – Edwin Boring discussed the Boring figure.
- 1931 – Gordon Allport et al. published the Allport-Vernon-Lindzey Study of Values, which defines six major value types.
- 1932 – Journal of Personality founded as first personality psychology research periodical originally titled Character and Personality.
- 1933 – Pyotr Gannushkin published Manifestations of Psychopathies.
- 1933 – Clark L. Hull published Hypnosis and Suggestibility, proving that hypnosis is not sleep and founding the modern study of hypnosis.
- 1933 – Wilhelm Reich published Character Analysis and The Mass Psychology of Fascism.
- 1934 – Lev Vygotsky published Thought and Language (Thinking and Speech).
- 1934 – Ruth Winifred Howard became the first African American woman to earn a PhD in psychology.
- 1935 – John Ridley Stroop developed a color-word task to demonstrate the interference of attention, the Stroop effect
- 1935 – Helen Flanders Dunbar published Emotions and Bodily Changes: A Survey of Literature on Psychosomatic Interrelationships; in 1942 she founded the American Psychosomatic Society (American Society for Research in Psychosomatic Problems), and was the first editor of the society's journal Psychosomatic Medicine: Experimental and Clinical Studies, founded in 1939.
- 1935 – Henry Murray and Christiana Morgan of Harvard University published the Thematic Apperception Test (TAT).
- 1935 – Theodore Newcomb began the Bennington College Study, which ended in 1939, documenting liberalization of women students' political beliefs, along with the effects of proximity on acquaintance and attraction.
- 1936 – Kurt Lewin published Principles of Topological Psychology, containing Lewin's Equation B = f (P, E), meaning that behavior is a function of a person in their environment.
- 1936 – Wilhelm Reich published The Sexual Revolution.
- 1936 – Kenneth Spence published an analysis of discrimination learning in terms of gradients of excitation and inhibition, showing that mathematical deductions from a quantitative theory could generate interesting and empirically testable predictions.
- 1936 – The Psychometric Society was founded by Louis Leon Thurstone, who proposed dividing general intelligence into seven primary mental abilities (PMAs).
- 1938 – B.F. Skinner published his first major work The Behavior of Organisms: An Experimental Analysis, introducing behavior analysis.
- 1939 – Alan Hodgkin and Andrew Huxley published a classic report in the journal Nature of the first recording of an action potential.
- 1939 – Neal E. Miller et al. published the frustration-aggression theory, which claims that aggression is the result of frustration of efforts to attain a goal.
- 1939 – David Wechsler developed the Wechsler-Bellevue Intelligence Scale.
- 1939 – On 1 September World War II began with the German invasion of Poland; on 20 September Adolf Hitler signed the Euthanasia Decree, written by psychologist Max de Crinis, resulting in the Aktion T4 euthanasia program; on 23 September Sigmund Freud committed physician-assisted suicide in London on the Jewish Day of Atonement; on 31 October his archrival Otto Rank died of a kidney infection in New York City after uttering the word "comical"; Wilhelm Reich fled to New York, coining the word orgone and building "orgone accumulators", which got him in trouble with the psychiatric establishment and the federal government.

=== 1940s ===
- 1940 – Edwin Boring discussed the moon illusion.
- 1941 – Erich Fromm published Escape from Freedom, founding political psychology.
- 1941 – B.F. Skinner and William Kaye Estes introduced the conditioned emotional response (CER)/conditioned fear response (CFR) paradigm via electric shocks given to rats.
- 1942 – Ludwig Binswanger founded existential therapy.
- 1942 – Carl Rogers published Counseling and Psychotherapy, suggesting that respect and a nonjudgmental approach to therapy is the foundation for effective treatment of mental health issues.
- 1943 – J. P. Guilford developed the Stanine (Standard Nine) test for the U.S. Air Force to evaluate pilots.
- 1943 – Clark L. Hull published Principles of Behavior, establishing animal-based learning and conditioning as the dominant learning theory.
- 1943 – Leo Kanner published Autistic Disturbances of Affective Contact, the first systematic description of autistic children.
- 1943 – Abraham Maslow published the paper A Theory of Human Motivation, describing Maslow's hierarchy of needs.
- 1944 – Zach Andrew and Cameron Peter published Myer's Psychology Second Edition where they revolutionized the approach of learned Psychology
- 1945 – The Journal of Clinical Psychology was founded.
- 1946 – Kurt Lewin founded action research.
- 1946 – Stanley Smith Stevens published his levels of measurement theory.
- 1947 – Jerome Bruner published Value and Need as Organizing Factors in Perception, founding New Look Psychology, which challenges psychologists to study not just an organism's response to a stimulus but also its internal interpretation.
- 1947 – Kurt Lewin coined the term "group dynamics".
- 1947 Nikolai Bernstein summarized his research on the measurement of actions using his original devices that became a beginning of a new discipline of kinesiology
- 1948 – Alfred Kinsey of Indiana University published Sexual Behavior in the Human Male.
- 1949 – The Boulder Conference outlined the scientist-practitioner model of clinical psychology.
- 1949 – Donald Hebb published The Organization of Behavior: A Neuropsychological Theory, in which he provided a detailed, testable theory of how the brain could support cognitive processes, revolutionizing neuropsychology and making McGill University a center of research.
- 1949 – David Wechsler published the Wechsler Intelligence Scale for Children (WISC).

=== 1950s ===
- 1950 – Karen Horney summarized her ideas in her magnum opus Neurosis and Human Growth: The Struggle Toward Self-Realization.
- 1950 – Erik Erikson published Childhood and Society, in which he introduced his theory on the stages of psycho-social development and the concept of an identity crisis.
- 1950 – Rollo May published The Meaning of Anxiety.
- 1951 – Solomon Asch published the Asch conformity experiments, demonstrating the power of conformity in groups.
- 1951 – Morton Deutsch published Interracial Housing: A Psychological Evaluation of a Social Experiment, producing scientific evidence of the bad effects of segregated housing, helping to end it in the U.S.
- 1951 – Carl Rogers published his magnum opus Client-Centered Therapy.
- 1951 – Lee Cronbach published his measure of reliability, now known as Cronbach's alpha.
- 1952 – The Diagnostic and Statistical Manual of Mental Disorders (DSM) was published by the American Psychiatric Association (APA), marking the beginning of modern mental illness classification; it was revised in 1968, 1980–7, 1994, 2000 and 2013.
- 1952 – Hans Eysenck started a debate on psychotherapy with his critical review, claiming that psychotherapy had no documented effect, and psychoanalysis had negative effects.
- 1953 – Alfred Kinsey published Sexual Behavior in the Human Female.
- 1953 – Nathaniel Kleitman of the U. of Chicago discovered rapid eye movement sleep (REM), founding modern sleep research.
- 1953 – David McClelland proposed need theory.
- 1953 – B.F. Skinner outlined behavioral therapy, lending support for behavioral psychology via research in the literature.
- 1953 – The Code of Ethics for Psychologists was developed by the American Psychological Association (APA).
- 1953 – Harry Stack Sullivan published The Interpersonal Theory of Psychiatry, which holds that an individual's personality is formed by relationships.
- 1954 – Abraham Maslow helped to found humanistic psychology, later developing Maslow's hierarchy of needs.
- 1954 – Paul E. Meehl published a paper claiming that mechanical (formal algorithmic) methods of data combination outperform clinical (subjective informal) methods when used to arrive at a prediction of behavior.
- 1954 – James Olds and Peter Milner of McGill University discovered the brain reward system, involving the brain's pleasure center.
- 1954 – Julian Rotter published Social Learning and Clinical Psychology, founding social learning theory.
- 1954 – Herman Witkin published Personality Through Perception, which claims that personality can be revealed through differences in how people perceive their environment; he went on to develop the Rod and Frame Test (RFT).
- 1954 – Bronisław Malinowski publishes Magic, Science and Religion on magical thinking and the psychology of religion. Earlier, he studied sets of rituals he referred to as magic, and distinguished these from purely religious rituals, with the latter's purpose being the coping with one's fundamental human crisis of apparent finiteness/mortality.
- 1955 – Lee Cronbach published Construct Validity in Psychological Tests, popularizing the concept of construct validity.
- 1955 – J. P. Guilford developed the Structure of Intellect (SOI) theory, which divides human intelligence into 150 abilities along three dimensions, operations, content, and products; it is discredited by the 1990s.
- 1955 – George Kelly founded personal construct psychology.
- 1956 – George Armitage Miller published the paper The Magical Number Seven, Plus or Minus Two, in which he showed that there is a limit on the amount of information that can be memorized at one time.
- 1956 – Rollo May published Existence, promoting existential psychology.
- 1957 – Leon Festinger published his theory of cognitive dissonance.
- 1957 – Stanley Smith Stevens published Stevens' power law.
- 1957 – Eric Berne developed Transactional analysis (TA), in which psychiatry patients can be treated for emotional distresses by analyzing and altering their social transactions.
- 1958 – John Cohen published Humanistic Psychology, the first book on the subject.
- 1958 – Harry Harlow gave the speech The Nature of Love, summarizing his isolation studies on infant monkeys and rejecting behavioristic and psychoanalytic theories of attachment.
- 1958 – Joseph Wolpe published his theory of reciprocal inhibition, leading to his theory of systematic desensitization for anxieties and phobias.
- 1959 – Viktor Frankl published the first English edition of Man's Search for Meaning [with a preface by Gordon Allport], which provided an existential account of his Holocaust experience and an overview of his system of existential analysis called Logotherapy.
- 1959 – Noam Chomsky published his review of B.F. Skinner's Verbal Behavior, an event seen as by many as the start of the cognitive revolution.
- 1959 – George Mandler and William Kessen published The Language of Psychology.
- 1959 – Lawrence Kohlberg wrote his doctoral dissertation, outlining Kohlberg's stages of moral development.

=== 1960s ===
- 1960 – John L. Fuller and W. Robert Thompson published the seminal text Behavior Genetics.
- 1960 – Thomas Szasz inaugurated the anti-psychiatry movement with the publication of his book, The Myth of Mental Illness.
- 1961 – Albert Bandura published the Bobo doll experiment, a study of behavioral patterns of aggression.
- 1961 – Neal E. Miller proposed the use of biofeedback to control involuntary functions.
- 1962 – Wilfred Bion presented his unconventional theory of thinking.
- 1962 – Albert Ellis published Reason and Emotion in Psychotherapy, describing the theoretical foundations of his therapeutic system known as Rational Emotive Behavior Therapy.
- 1962 – George Armitage Miller published Psychology, the Science of Mental Life, rejecting the idea that psychology should study only behavior.
- 1962 – Abraham Maslow published Toward a Psychology of Being, presenting his ideas of self-actualization and the hierarchy of human needs.
- 1962 – Stanley Schachter and Jerome Singer proposed the two-factor theory of emotion, which considers emotion to be a function of both cognitive factors and physiological arousal; "People search the immediate environment for emotionally relevant cues to label and interpret unexplained physiological arousal."
- 1962 – Silvan Tomkins published volume one (of two) of Affect Imagery Consciousness, presenting his affect theory
- 1963 – Stanley Milgram published his study of obedience to authority, now known as the Milgram experiment.
- 1964 – Jean M. Mandler and George Mandler published Thinking: From Association to Gestalt.
- 1964 – Virginia Satir published Conjoint Family Therapy, the first of several books on family therapy, causing her to become known as the "Mother of Family Therapy"
- 1965 – Anna Freud published Normality and Pathology in Childhood: Assessments of Development, presenting the concept of developmental lines.
- 1965 – William Glasser published Reality Therapy, describing his psycho-therapeutic model and introducing his concept of control theory [later renamed to Choice Theory].
- 1965 – Donald Winnicott published The Maturational Process and the Facilitating Environment, which became a main text in clinical psychodynamic developmental psychology.
- 1966 – Nancy Bayley became the first woman to receive the APA Distinguished Scientific Contribution Award for her contribution in developmental psychology.
- 1966 – Konrad Lorenz published On Aggression, which discusses his hydraulic model of instinctive pressures.
- 1966 – Masters and Johnson published Human Sexual Response.
- 1966 – Julian Rotter published a paper proposing the Internal-External Locus of Control Scale (I-E Scale).
- 1967 – Aaron Beck published a psychological model of clinical depression, suggesting that thoughts play a significant role in the development and maintenance of depression.
- 1967 – Edward E. Jones and Victor Harris published a paper defining fundamental attribution error, underestimating the effect of the situation in explaining social behavior.
- 1967 – Ulric Neisser founded cognitive psychology.
- 1968 – George Cotzias developed the L-Dopa treatment for Parkinson's disease.
- 1968 – Mary Main published her hypothesis of a fourth attachment style in children, the insecure disorganized attachment style.
- 1968 – Walter Mischel published the paper "Personality and Assessment", criticizing Gordon Allport's works on trait assessment with the observation that a patient's behavior is not consistent across diverse situations but dependent on situational cues.
- 1968 – DSM-II was published by the American Psychiatric Association.
- 1968 – The first Doctor of Psychology (Psy. D.) professional degree program in Clinical Psychology was established in the Department of Psychology at the University of Illinois at Urbana–Champaign.
- 1969 – The California School of Professional Psychology was established as the first freestanding school of professional psychology.
- 1969 – The Journal of Transpersonal Psychology was founded by Abraham Maslow, Stanislav Grof, and Anthony Sutich.
- 1969 – John Bowlby published his attachment theory in the classic book Attachment and Loss (vol. 1 of 3).
- 1969 – Harry Harlow published his experiment on affection development in rhesus monkeys.
- 1969 – Joseph Wolpe published the Subjective Units of Distress (Disturbance) Scale (SUDS).
- 1969 – Elisabeth Kübler-Ross published On Death and Dying, presenting the Kübler-Ross model, commonly referred to as the five stages of grief.
- 1969 – The Association for Women in Psychology (AWP) was founded, with Joann Evansgardner as the first (temporary) president.

=== 1970s ===
- 1970 – At an APA Town Hall Meeting, with the support of the Association for Women in Psychology, Phyllis Chesler and Nancy Henley prepared a statement on APA's obligations to women and demanded one million dollars in reparation for the damage psychology had perpetrated against women's minds and bodies.
- 1970 – APA Division 29 gives its first Distinguished Professional Award in Psychology and Psychotherapy to Eugene Gendlin.
- 1970 – "Critical psychology" became a psychological theoretical field. Klaus Holzkamp, who worked as a professor at the Free University of Berlin, took a central role in defining critical psychology based on the works of Karl Marx and Aleksei N. Leontiev.
- 1970 – Masters and Johnson published Human Sexual Inadequacy.
- 1971 – The Stanford prison experiment, conducted by Philip Zimbardo et al. at Stanford University, studied the human response to captivity; the experiment quickly got out of hand and was ended early.
- 1971 – Martin Shubik performed the dollar auction, illustrating irrational choices.
- 1971 – In Nov. John O'Keefe and Jonathan O. Dostrovsky announced their discovery of place cells in the hippocampus.
- 1971 – The Leibniz Institute for Psychology Information at the University of Trier was founded to publish the PSYNDEX database of references to psychology in the German-speaking world.
- 1972 – The Dunedin Multidisciplinary Health and Development Study commenced, a longitudinal study began, with 96% retention rate as of 2006, unprecedented for a longitudinal study, comparing to 20–40% dropout rates for other studies.
- 1972 – Robert E. Ornstein published The Psychology of Consciousness, about the use of biofeedback et al. to shift mood and awareness.
- 1972 – Gilles Deleuze and Felix Guattari published Anti-Oedipus, the first of two-volume work Capitalism and Schizophrenia, criticizing traditional psychoanalysis and its concepts to purpose a new set of theories which they called schizoanalysis.
- 1972 – Endel Tulving first made the distinction between episodic and semantic memory.
- 1973 – Ernest Becker published The Denial of Death, siding with Otto Rank against Sigmund Freud, claiming that knowledge of one's mortality not sexuality is the basis of character.
- 1973 – Morton Deutsch published The Resolution of Conflict.
- 1973 – Vygotsky Circle neuropsychologist Alexander Luria published The Working Brain, a detailed description with great emphasis on rehabilitation of damage.
- 1973 – The Vail Conference of Graduate Educators in Psychology endorsed the scholar-practitioner training model, and approved the Doctor of Psychology (Psy. D) degree.
- 1973 – Division 35, later the Society for the Psychology of Women of the APA, was formed, with Elizabeth Douvan as the first president.
- 1973 – The Committee on Women in Psychology of the APA was formed, with Martha Mednick as its first chair.
- 1973 – The American Psychiatric Association declassified homosexuality as a mental disorder.
- 1973 – The Caucus of Gay, Lesbian, and Bisexual Members of the American Psychiatric Association was officially founded to advocate to the APA on LGBT mental health issues; in 1985 it changed its name to the Association of Gay and Lesbian Psychiatrists.
- 1973 – Nancy Friday published My Secret Garden: Women's Sexual Fantasies
- 1973 – Timothy Leary published Neurologic, describing the eight-circuit model of consciousness.
- 1974 – Sandra Bem created the Bem Sex-Role Inventory.
- 1974 – Robert Hinde published Biological Bases of Human Social Behavior, a main text in etological-oriented developmental psychology.
- 1974 – Arnold Sameroff published Reproductive Risk and the Continuum of Caretaking Causality, introducing the transactional model of psychology, which became influential.
- 1974 – Alan Baddeley and Graham Hitch of the Univ. of York proposed Baddeley's model of working memory.
- 1974 – Elizabeth Loftus began publishing papers on the malleability of human memory, the misinformation effect, and false memory syndrome and its relation to recovered memory therapy.
- 1974 – The APA Task Force on Sex Bias and Sex-Role Stereotyping in Psychotherapeutic Practice was appointed.
- 1975 – Georgia Babladelis became the first editor of the Psychology of Women Quarterly.
- 1975 – George Mandler published Mind and Emotion.
- 1975 – Mary Wright became the first chair of the new Task Force on the Status of Women in Canadian Psychology.
- 1975 – Robert Zajonc published the confluence model, showing how birth order and family size affect IQ.
- 1975 – The first APA-sponsored Psychology of Women Conference was held.
- 1975 – The journal Sex Roles was founded.
- 1975 – The first review article on the psychology of women appeared in the women's studies journal Signs, by Mary Parlee.
- 1975 – The first article on the psychology of women was published in the Annual Review of Psychology.
- 1975 – The council of representatives of the American Psychological Association (APA) declassified homosexuality as a mental disorder.
- 1976 – Stanislav Grof founded the International Transpersonal Association to promote his transpersonal psychology.
- 1976 – Julian Jaynes published The Origin of Consciousness in the Breakdown of the Bicameral Mind, which coins the term bicameral mind for the brain of humans who lived before about 1,000 BCE, whose right side "speaks" in the name of a chieftain or god, and whose left side "listens" and takes orders.
- 1976 – Michael Posner published Chronometric Explorations of Mind, using the subtractive method of Franciscus Donders to study attention and memory.
- 1976 – The Psychology of Women Quarterly was founded.
- 1977 – Ernest Hilgard proposed the divided consciousness theory of hypnosis.
- 1977 – Albert Bandura published the book Social Learning Theory and an article on the concept of self-efficacy, A Unifying Theory of Behavioral Change.
- 1977 – Susan Folstein and Michael Rutter published a study of 21 British twins in Journal of Child Psychology and Psychiatry that reveals a high genetic component in autism.
- 1977 – Robert Plomin et al. proposed three major ways in which genes and environments act together to shape human behavior, coining the terms passive, active, and evocative gene–environment correlation.
- 1977 – Andrey Lichko published Psychopathies and Accentuations of Character of Teenagers.
- 1978 – Child psychologist Mary Ainsworth published her book Patterns of Attachment about her work on attachment theory and the Strange Situation Experiment (Protocol).
- 1978 – Paul Ekman published the Facial Action Coding System.
- 1978 – David Premack published the book Does the Chimpanzee Have a Theory of Mind?, about his research on mental abilities of monkeys, introducing the term theory of mind.
- 1978 – The term cognitive neuroscience was coined by Michael Gazzaniga and George Armitage Miller for the effort to understand how the brain represents mental events.
- 1978 – John O'Keefe and Lynn Nadel published The Hippocampus as a Cognitive Map.
- 1978 – E.O. Wilson published On Human Nature, considered the first landmark text to deal with what would become evolutionary psychology.
- 1978 – The first Canadian Institute on Women and Psychology pre-convention conference was hosted at the Canadian Psychological Association by IGWAP (Interest Group on Women and Psychology).
- 1978 – The Caucus of Gay, Lesbian, and Bisexual Members of the American Psychiatric Association, (now known as the Association of Gay and Lesbian Psychiatrists) successfully petitioned the American Psychiatric Association (APA) to create a task force on lesbian and gay issues; it was elevated to a full standing committee in the APA in 1988.
- 1979 – Alice Miller published The Drama of the Gifted Child, the first of a series of books criticizing Freud and Jung for blaming the child for the sexual abuse of the parents, which she calls the "poisonous pedagogies".
- 1979 – Urie Bronfenbrenner published The Ecology of Human Development, founding ecological systems theory.

=== 1980s ===
- 1980 – Transgender people were officially classified by the American Psychiatric Association as having "gender identity disorder."
- 1980 – DSM-III was published by the American Psychiatric Association (APA).
- 1980 – George Mandler published Recognizing: The Judgment of Previous Occurrence, claiming a dual process basis of recognition, prior occurrence and identification.
- 1980 – Robert Zajonc published the paper "Feeling and Thinking: Preferences Need No Inferences", arguing that affective and cognitive systems are largely independent, and that affect is more powerful and important, reviving the study of emotion and affective processes.
- 1981 – Alan P. Bell, Martin S. Weinberg, and Sue Kiefer Hammersmith's Sexual Preference is published.
- 1982 – Carol Gilligan published In a Different Voice, a work on feminist psychology.
- 1982 – The Caucus of Gay, Lesbian, and Bisexual Members of the American Psychiatric Association (APA) was recognized as a representative in the APA assembly, speaking directly on matters of special concern to lesbian and gay members.
- 1983 – Howard Gardner published Frames of Mind, introducing his theory of multiple intelligences.
- 1983 – The Caucus of Gay, Lesbian, and Bisexual Members of the American Psychiatric Association (APA) successfully petitioned the APA to create a task force on psychiatric aspects of AIDS, which ultimately led to the 1984 publication of two important APA volumes Innovations in Psychotherapy with Homosexuals and Psychiatric Implications of Acquired Immune Deficiency Syndrome.
- 1983 – W. David Pierce et al. published a paper about activity-based anorexia.
- 1984 – Jerome Kagan published The Nature of the Child, a biological and socially oriented description of the role of temperament in human development.
- 1984 – Peter Saville published the OPQ Pentagon questionnaire, a psychological personality inventory measuring the five factor model.
- 1984 – Florence Denmark, Carolyn R. Payton, and Laurie Eyde received the first American Psychological Association (APA) Committee on Women in Psychology Leadership Awards.
- 1985 – Daniel Stern published The Interpersonal World of the Infant, proposing an extensive mental life in early infancy.
- 1985 – Robert Sternberg proposed his triarchic theory of intelligence
- 1985 – Reuben Baron and David A. Kenny published the article The Moderator-Mediator Variable Distinction in Social Psychological Research: Conceptual, Strategic, and Statistical Considerations in the Journal of Personality and Social Psychology proposing a distinction of moderating in mediating variables in psychological research.
- 1985 – Simon Baron-Cohen published Does the Autistic Child Have a 'Theory of Mind'? with Uta Frith and Alan Leslie, proposing that children with autism show social and communication difficulties as a result of a delay in the development of a theory of mind.
- 1985 – Costa & McRae published the NEO PI_R Five-Factor Personality Inventory, a 240-question measure of the five factor model
- 1986 – Albert Bandura published Social Foundations of Thought and Action: A Social Cognitive Theory.
- 1986 – David Rumelhart and James McClelland published Parallel Distributed Processing: Explorations in the Microstructure of Cognition.
- 1987 – Erik Erikson published The Life Cycle Completed, expanding on Erikson's stages of psychosocial development.
- 1987 – Roger Shepard published the universal law of generalization for psychological science.
- 1987 – The diagnostic category of "ego-dystonic homosexuality" was removed from the American Psychiatric Association's DSM with the publication of the DSM-III-R, though it still potentially remains in the DSM-IV under the category of "sexual disorder not otherwise specified" including "persistent and marked distress about one's sexual orientation".
- 1988 – Michael M. Merzenich et al. showed that sensory and motor maps in the cortex can be modified with experience, a process called neural plasticity.
- 1988 – Claude Steele proposed the theory of self-affirmation.
- 1989 – Psychophysiologist Vladimir Rusalov published first activity-specific model of temperament

=== 1990s ===
- 1990 – On 17 May the World Health Organization (WHO) declassified homosexuality as a mental disorder, launching the International Day Against Homophobia and Transphobia.
- 1990 – Leonard Berkowitz published the cognitive neoassociation model of aggressive behavior to cover the cases missed by the frustration-aggression hypothesis.
- 1991 – Steven Pinker proposed his theory on how children acquire language in Science, later popularized in the book The Language Instinct.
- 1991 – The first issue of Feminism & Psychology was published.
- 1991- The American Psychoanalytic Association (APsaA) passed a resolution opposing "public or private discrimination" against homosexuals. It stopped short, however, of agreeing to open its training institutes to these individuals.
- 1992 – The American Psychoanalytic Association (APsaA) extended the provisions of its 1991 resolution (see above) to training candidates at its affiliated institutes.
- 1992 – Jaak Panksepp coined the term affective neuroscience for the name of the field that studies neural mechanisms of emotion, and in 1998 published the book Affective Neuroscience – The Foundations of Human and Animal Emotions
- 1992 – Sandra Scarr published Developmental Theories of the 1990s, proposing that genes control experiences, and search and create environments.
- 1992 – Joseph LeDoux summarized and published his research on brain mechanisms of emotion and emotional learning.
- 1992 – The American Psychological Association (APA) selected behavioral genetics as one of two themes that best represented the past, present, and future of psychology.
- 1994 – DSM-IV was published by the American Psychiatric Association (APA).
- 1994 – Antonio Damasio published Descartes' Error, presenting the somatic marker hypothesis (SMH) by which emotional processes can guide (or bias) behavior, particularly decision-making.
- 1994 – Richard J. Herrnstein and Charles Murray published The Bell Curve.
- 1994 – Michael Posner and Marcus Raichle published Images of the Mind, using positron emission tomography (PET) to localize brain cognitive functions.
- 1994 – Esther Thelen and Linda B. Smith published A Dynamic Systems Approach to the Development of Cognition and Action, a book on the use of developmental models based on dynamic systems.
- 1994 – A study reports that magical thinking emerges more frequently under high-stress (e.g. immediate death anxiety) conditions.
- 1994 – Harvard University professor of psychiatry John E. Mack interviews dozens of experiencers of the 1994 Ariel School UFO incident, reporting the event to the world, which indicated that the event cannot be dismissed as mass hysteria, after going on television with alien abductees during the spring of 1994
- 1995 – Simon Baron-Cohen coined the term mental blindness to reflect the inability of children with autism to properly represent the mental states of others.
- 1996 – Giacomo Rizzolatti published his discovery of mirror neurons.
- 1996 – Amos Tversky defined ambiguity aversion, the idea that people do not like ambiguous choices, relating it to comparative ignorance.
- 1997 – The American Psychoanalytic Association (APsaA) became the first U.S. national mental health organization to support same-sex marriage.
- 1999 – George Botterill published The Philosophy of Psychology, about how modern cognitive science challenges our common sense self-image.

== 21st century ==
=== 2000s ===
- 2000 – Alan Baddeley updated his model of working memory from 1974 to include the episodic buffer as a third slave system alongside the phonological loop and the visuo-spatial sketchpad
- 2000 – Max Velmans published Understanding Consciousness, arguing for reflexive monism.
- 2002 – Avshalom Caspi et al. presented a study that was the first to provide epidemiological evidence that a specific genotype moderates children's sensitivity to environmental insults.
- 2002 – Steven Pinker published The Blank Slate: The Modern Denial of Human Nature, arguing against tabula rasa models of the social sciences.
- 2002 – Daniel Kahneman won Nobel Prize
- 2007 – George Mandler published A History of Modern Experimental Psychology

=== 2010s ===
- 2010s – As research on the topic accumulates and its usage increases, scientists investigate neuroenhancement – such as nootropics – regarding psychological mechanisms underlying cognitive functions, neuroethics, effects on moral decision-making, public perception, their potential for the treatment of mental diseases, and the potential or ongoing use by professionals or self-administering civilians.
- 2010s – With the rise of smartphone gaming and a continued large and nearly entirely commercially-driven gaming industry and Big Tech, mobile apps and social media are made intentionally addictive using insights from psychology. Research works such as The Age of Addiction: How Bad Habits Became Big Business propose that the methods of "limbic capitalism" have become substantially more sophisticated.
- 2010s – With increasing legalization of cannabis within the U.S. and worldwide, chronic effects of various types of cannabis consumption on cognition, along with comparisons of legalization impacts, become a more common focus of psychological research.
- 2010s – As digital content becomes more abundant and more immediately available, attention gains a higher value, with the attention economy, where attention is the capital alongside data on consumers, taking shape as part of "mental capitalism".
- 2010s – Neuroscience and genetics investigate neurological and heritable factors of intelligence and develop neuroimaging intelligence testing, powered by far more extensive data and sophisticated tools.
- 2010 – The draft of DSM-5 by the American Psychiatric Association (APA) was distributed for comment and critique.
- 2010 – Simon LeVay published Gay, Straight, and the Reason Why.
- 2012 – In 2009 America's professional association of endocrinologists established best practices for transgender children that included prescribing puberty-suppressing drugs to preteens followed by hormone therapy beginning at about age 16, and in 2012 the American Academy of Child and Adolescent Psychiatry echoed these recommendations.
- 2012 – The American Psychiatric Association issued official position statements supporting the care and civil rights of transgender and gender non-conforming individuals.
- 2013 – On 2 April U.S. President Barack Obama announced the 10-year BRAIN Initiative to map the activity of every neuron in the human brain.
- 2013 – DSM-5 was published by the American Psychiatric Association (APA). Among other things, it eliminated the term "gender identity disorder", which was considered stigmatizing, instead referring to "gender dysphoria", which focuses attention only on those who feel distressed by their gender identity.
- 2014 – Stanislas Dehaene, Giacomo Rizzolatti, and Trevor Robbins, were awarded the Brain Prize for their research on higher brain mechanisms underpinning literacy, numeracy, motivated behaviour, social cognition, and their disorders.
- 2014 – Brenda Milner, Marcus Raichle, and John O'Keefe received the Kavli Prize in Neuroscience for the discovery of specialized brain networks for memory and cognition
- 2014 – John O'Keefe shared the Nobel Prize in Physiology or Medicine with May-Britt Moser and Edvard Moser for their discoveries of cells (Place cell, Grid cell) that constitute a positioning system in the brain.
- 2015 – The journal Psychology Today announced that it will no longer accept ads for gay conversion therapy, and is deleting medical practitioners who list such therapy in their professional profiles.
- 7 August 2015 – The American Psychological Association barred psychologists from participating in national security interrogations at sites violating international law.
- 27 August 2015 – The Reproducibility Project, a crowdsourced collaboration of 270 contributing authors led by Brian Nosek to repeat 100 published experimental and correlational psychological studies, shows the replication crisis in psychology research, a term coined in the early 2010s when awareness of the problem was growing. According to the study published in Science, only 39 of 100 studies published in major psychology journals could be replicated.
- 2016 – Intensive use of psychological profiling and psychographic microtargeting, as well as voter manipulation – such as Internet manipulation, using insights from psychology and psychological data becomes a worldwide prevalent phenomenon in politics of majoritarian plain-votes-based democracies. Social media has given rise to new public opinion cues that often have weak links with real public opinion, part of social media-driven societal and ideological polarisation via "filter bubbles", which becomes an increasingly common topic of psychological research along with conspirational thinking/mentality and misinformation-proliferation.
- 13 June 2019 – A study concludes that "spending at least 120 minutes a week in nature [e.g. via one long or many shorter visits/week] is associated with good health and wellbeing".
- June 2019 — The World Health Organization included gaming disorder, characterized by problematic or compulsive use of video games, in the 11th revision of the International Classification of Diseases.
- November 2019 – Researchers report, based on an international study of 27 countries, that caring for families is the main motivator for people worldwide.

=== 2020s ===
- 2020s – Researchers investigate the impacts of different forms (types or categories) of digital media uses on cognition and the impacts of digital media use(s) on different types of biological cognitive abilities.
- 2020s – The pandemic COVID-19 and its mitigation have a substantiall toll on mental health worldwide.
- With growing awareness and impacts of climate change and other environmental issues, ecopsychology increasingly gathers public attention and becomes a more common topic of research
  - Studies investigate the psychological benefits of urban green spaces (UGS) in detail, with one 2021 study reporting that higher exposure to woodland urban green spaces or urban forest but not grassland is associated with improved cognitive development and risks of mental problems for urban adolescents.
  - August 2020 – A review concludes that "Within a generation, children's lives have largely moved indoors" and that "research indicates that direct experiences of nature in childhood contribute to care for nature across the life span."
  - March 2021 – A study concludes that "eco-anger", termed in the style of the recently coined "eco-anxiety" which is reported to be rising, "predicted better mental health outcomes, as well as greater engagement in pro-climate activism and personal behaviours". Anger may be "powerful in motivating people to get involved" and to overcome degrees of apathy.
  - 2020s – Research investigates how well-being could objectively or effectively be measured for health and ecological economics.
- 2020s – Accumulating and substantially more sophisticated research, often using large biological datasets, investigate the links of probiotics and mental health (psychobiotics) and potential interventions, the links of nutrition and mental health (nutrition psychology) and potential recommendations or interventions, and neurobiological effects of physical exercise that affect mental health. Moreover, research increasingly begins to investigate potential interventions or modifyable factors in brain aging.
- 2020s – Research investigates challenges of manipulative choice architectures, false and misleading information and distracting environments and respective potential interventions.
- 2020s – In the new field of neuromarketing, consumers are manipulated with insights from neuroscience and psychology to lead consumer decision making and behavior.

2020

- June – Scientists reporting the discovery of Aguada Fénix put forward a theory of cognitive archaeology whereby communal work of such large projects was important in the initial development of the Maya civilization.
- November – The first whole-genome comparison between chimpanzees and bonobos is published and shows genomic aspects that may underlie or have resulted from their divergence and behavioral differences, including selection for genes related to diet and hormones.

2021

- July – A study reports that adolescent loneliness in contemporary schools and depression increased substantially and consistently worldwide after 2012.
- September – Psychologist and behavior geneticist Kathryn Paige Harden publishes The Genetic Lottery: Why DNA Matters for Social Equality, an argument for using genetics to create a just society – including in terms of psychology-related predispositions, similar to a bioethical argument made by Papaioannou in 2013.
- October – The American Psychological Association releases guidelines for the optimal use of social media in professional psychological practice.
- December – In applied behavioural science, "megastudies" as meta-analyses are proposed and demonstrated for investigating the efficacy of many different interventions designed in an interdisciplinary manner by separate teams, e.g. to inform policy.

2022

- July – A deep learning system that learns intuitive fundamental physics from visual data (of virtual 3D environments) that is based on the violation-of-expectation theory of visual cognition in infants is reported.
- November – A study reports estimated contemporary prevalence and psychological associations with belief in witchcraft around the world, which (in their data) varied between 9% and 90% between nations and is still a widespread element in worldviews globally. It for example shows associations with low "innovative activity", "weak institutions", lower life expectancy, lower life satisfaction and high religiosity.
- November – A study delivers a potential explanation-component for why learning is often more efficient in children beyond the higher level of neuroplasticity.

2023

- February – A study hypothesizes mental health awareness efforts (in current forms) or increasingly glamorised and romanticised mental disorders on social media (e.g. quotes about depression on aesthetically appealing backgrounds shared more widely on certain social media – especially TikTok) may contribute to the recent substantial rise in reported mental health problems by intensifying and over-diagnosing of such. Around 2023, the rapid rise of TikTok prompts extensive research into potential harmful effects of such apps such as higher levels of mental problems correlating with higher levels of usage or addictive elements of this and similar apps.
- March – Bioengineers show bodily system changes can induce anxiety, in specific altered heart rate by itself in risky contexts, after earlier studies also implicated immune system elements.
- April – The first review of interventions against false conspiracy beliefs is published, indicating interventions "that fostered an analytical mindset or taught critical thinking skills" are most effective and that preventive action is important.
- June – A time-use study provides the first comprehensive bird's-eye view, with a "global human day" framework, of what humans currently spend their time on.

== See also ==
- Timeline of psychiatry
- Timeline of sociology
