= Timeline of psychotherapy =

This article is a compiled timeline of psychotherapy. A more general description of the development of the subject of psychology can be found in the History of psychology article. For related overviews see the Timeline of psychology and Timeline of psychiatry articles.

== Antiquity ==
- c. 1550 BCE – Ancient Egyptians codified their knowledge of psychiatry, medicine, and surgery in the Ebers Papyrus and the Edwin Smith Papyrus. The former mentioned dementia and depression, while the latter gave detailed instructions for various neurosurgical procedures. The power of magic (suggestion) was recognized as complementary to medicine.
- c. 500 BCE – Siddhartha Gautama (Lumbini, Nepal) founded the psychotherapeutic practices of Buddhism on the principle that the origin of mental suffering is ignorance, that the symptoms of ignorance are attachment and craving, and that attachment and craving can be ended by following the Noble Eightfold Path.
- c. 400 BCE – Hippocrates (Kos, Greece) taught that melancholia (depression) has a biological cause, namely an excess of black bile, one of the four humours. Ancient Greek therapy for disorders of mood involved adjustment of the humours, to bring them into balance.
- c. 300 BCE – Composition of the Huangdi Neijing began in China. This medical work emphasized the relationship between organs and emotions, and formalized the theory of Qi (life-force) and the balancing of the primal forces of Yin and yang.
- c. 170 BCE – Composition of On the Diagnosis and Cure of the Soul's Passion by Galen in Ancient Greece, containing directions on how to provide counsel to those with psychological issues to prompt them to reveal their deepest passions and secrets, and eventually cure them of their mental deficiency.

== Middle Ages ==
=== 10th century ===
- c. 900 – Ahmed ibn Sahl al-Balkhi (Balkh, Afghanistan) introduces the concepts of mental health or "mental hygiene". He also recognized that illnesses can have both psychological and/or physiological causes.
- c. 900 – al-Razi (Rhazes) recognized the concept of "psychotherapy" and referred to it as al-‘ilaj al-nafs.

=== 11th century ===
- 1025 – Avicenna (Bukhara Region, Uzbekistan) described in The Canon of Medicine a number of conditions, including hallucination, insomnia, mania, nightmare, melancholia, dementia, epilepsy, paralysis, stroke, vertigo and tremor.

=== 12th century ===
- c. 1150 – Ibn Zuhr, a.k.a. 'Avenzoar" (Seville, Spain), a Muslim Arab physician and surgeon, gave the first accurate descriptions on certain neurological disorders such as meningitis, intracranial thrombophlebitis, and mediastinal germ cell tumors.
- c. 1150 – Averroes suggested the existence of Parkinson's disease.

=== 13th century ===
- c. 1200 – Maimonides wrote about neuropsychiatric disorders and described rabies and belladonna intoxication.

=== 15th century ===
- 1403 – The Bethlem Royal Hospital of London, (Bedlam) (established as a hospital in 1330) admitted its first mentally ill patients. The care amounted to little more than restraint.

=== 16th century ===
- 1567 – Philippus Aureolus Theophrastus Bombastus von Hohenheim, a.k.a. "Paracelsus" (Einsiedeln, Switzerland) is credited as providing the first clinical/scientific mention of the unconscious in his work Von den Krankheiten. He called for the humane treatment of the mentally ill (but was ignored for several centuries) as he saw them not to be possessed by evil spirits, but merely "brothers ensnared in a treatable malady."

== 18th century ==
=== 1770s ===
- 1770 – Johann Joseph Gassner initiated a therapeutic practice using a precursor of hypnotherapy and exorcism.
- 1774 – Franz Mesmer described the therapeutic properties of "animal magnetism" (hypnotherapy), and began a clinical practice.

=== 1780s ===
- 1785 – Marquis de Puységur founded the Société Harmonique des Amis Réunis to train specialists in Mesmerism (hypnotherapy).

=== 1790s ===
- 1793 – Jean-Baptiste Pussin, working with Philippe Pinel, took over France's Bicetre Hospital and began releasing incarcerated mental patients from chains and iron shackles in the first movement for the humane treatment of the mentally ill. "The Moral Treatment" included humane, non-violent, and drug-free management of mental illness.

== 19th century ==
=== 1800s ===
- 1801 – Philippe Pinel (France) published the first psychological approach to the treatment of the insane. The work appeared in English translation in 1806, as Treatise on Insanity.

=== 1810s ===
- 1813 – Abbé Faria identified the central role of suggestion in "animal magnetism" (hypnotherapy).

=== 1820s ===
- 1826 – Justinus Kerner began treatment of patients with a combination of "animal magnetism" (hypnotherapy) and exorcism.

=== 1830s ===
- 1832 – First appearance of psychotherapy in fiction ("The Haunted Man" short story by John Neal).

=== 1870s ===
- 1870 – Jean-Martin Charcot began clinical research into hysteria (conversion disorder) at the Salpêtrière Hospital in Paris.

=== 1880s ===
- 1884 – Jean-Martin Charcot explained demonic possession as a form of hysteria (conversion disorder), to be treated with hypnotherapy.
- 1885 – Pierre Janet began therapeutic practice and research in Le Havre.
- 1886 – Sigmund Freud began therapeutic practice and research in Vienna.

=== 1890s ===
- 1892 – Foundation of the American Psychological Association (APA), headed by G. Stanley Hall.
- 1896 – Development of the first psychological clinic at the University of Pennsylvania, marking the birth of clinical psychology.
- 1898 – Boris Sidis publishes The Psychology of Suggestion: A Research into the Subconscious Nature of Man and Society.

== 20th century ==
=== 1900s ===
- 1900 – Sigmund Freud published Interpretation of Dreams, marking the beginning of Psychoanalytic Thought.
- 1902 – In the autumn the Wednesday Psychological Society (Psychologische Mittwochs-Gesellschaft) started meeting in Freud's apartment in Vienna, marking the beginnings of the worldwide psychoanalytic movement.
- 1906 – The Journal of Abnormal Psychology founded by Morton Prince for which Boris Sidis was an associate editor and significant contributor.
- 1906 – The Child Guidance Movement begins in Chicago.
- 1906 – Carl Jung began correspondence with Freud.
- 1907 – Jung and his wife, Emma travelled to Vienna to meet with Freud.
- 1909 – Sandor Ferenczi, Freud and Jung travelled together to the United States to participate in the Clark University conference.

=== 1910s ===
- 1910 – Freud proposes Jung as his "eldest son and heir" to his new science.
- 1910 – Boris Sidis opens the Sidis Psychotherapeutic Institute (a private hospital) at Maplewood Farms in Portsmouth, NH for the treatment of nervous patients using the latest scientific methods.
- 1911 – Alfred Adler left Freud's Psychoanalytic Group to form his own school of thought, individual psychology, accusing Freud of overemphasizing sexuality and basing his theory on his own childhood.
- 1912 – Publication of Jung's Psychology of the Unconscious: a study of the transformations and symbolisms of the libido, (subsequently republished as Symbols of Transformation), containing his dissenting view on the libido, it represented largely a "psychoanalytical Jung".
- 1913 – Carl Jung departed from Freudian views, a final break ensued and he developed his own theories citing Freud's inability to acknowledge religion and spirituality and his restricted view of libido. His "new school of thought" became known as Analytical Psychology.
- 1913 – Jacob L. Moreno applied group psychotherapy methods in Vienna. His methods, which emphasized spontaneity and interaction, later became known as psychodrama and sociometry.
- 1914 – Boris Sidis publishes The Foundations of Normal and Abnormal Psychology where he provides the scientific foundation for the field of psychology, and details his theory of the moment-consciousness.
- 1919 – The British Psychoanalytical Society established by Ernest Jones in London.

=== 1920s ===
- 1921 – Jacob L. Moreno conducted the first large scale public psychodrama session at the Komoedienhaus, Vienna. He moved to New York in 1925.
- 1922 – Boris Sidis publishes Nervous Ills: Their Cause and a Cure, a popularization of his work concerning the subconscious and the treatment of psychopathic disease.

=== 1930s ===
- 1933 – Wilhelm Reich published his influential book Character Analysis giving his view that a person's entire character, not only individual symptoms, could be looked at and treated as a neurotic phenomenon. The book also introduced his theory of body armoring.
- 1936 – Karen Horney began her critique of Freudian psychoanalytic theory with the publication of Feminine Psychology.
- 1936 – Saul Rosenzweig published his article Some Implicit Common Factors in Diverse Methods of Psychotherapy, in which he argued that common factors, rather than specific ingredients, cause change in psychotherapy.

=== 1940s ===
- 1942 – Carl Rogers published Counseling and Psychotherapy, suggesting that respect and a non-judgmental approach to therapy is the foundation for effective treatment of mental health issues.
- 1943 – Albert Hofmann writes his first report about the hallucinogenic properties of LSD, which he first synthesized in 1938. LSD was practiced as a therapeutic drug throughout the 1950s and 1960s.
- 1945 – Society of Analytical Psychology incorporated in London
- 1945 – Orval Hobart Mowrer founded Integrity Groups therapy.
- 1945 – The Journal of Clinical Psychology was founded.
- 1949 – The Boulder Conference outlined the scientist-practitioner model of clinical psychology, looking at the master's degree versus PhD used by medical providers and researchers, respectively.

=== 1950s ===
- 1951 – Carl Rogers published his major work, Client-Centered Therapy.
- 1951 – The seminal work of "Gestalt Therapy: Excitement and Growth in the Human Personality" is published, co-authored by Fritz Perls, Paul Goodman, and Ralph Hefferline.
- 1951 – The Association of Psychotherapists established in London.
- 1952 – The Diagnostic and Statistical Manual of Mental Disorders (DSM) was published by The American Psychiatric Association marking the beginning of modern mental illness classification.
- 1953 – B.F. Skinner outlined behavioral therapy, lending support for behavioral psychology via research in the literature.
- 1953 – Code of Ethics for Psychologists developed by the American Psychological Association.
- 1954 – Abraham Maslow helped to found Humanistic psychology and later developed his famous Hierarchy of Needs.
- 1955 – Albert Ellis began teaching the methods of Rational Emotive Behavior Therapy the first form of cognitive psychotherapy.
- 1959 – Viktor Frankl published the first English edition of Man's Search for Meaning [with a preface by Gordon Allport], which provided an existential account of his Holocaust experience and an overview of his system of existential analysis called Logotherapy.

=== 1960s ===
- 1960 – Thomas Szasz inaugurated the anti-psychiatry movement with the publication of his book, The Myth of Mental Illness.
- 1960 – R. D. Laing published The Divided Self which saw mental illness as an expression or communication of the individual and so represented valid descriptions of lived experience or reality rather than as symptoms of some separate or underlying disorder.
- 1962 – The Esalen Institute founded at Big Sur California, acting as a focus for the development of many branches of Humanistic psychology.
- 1965 – William Glasser published Reality Therapy, describing his psycho-therapeutic model and introducing his concept of control theory [later renamed to Choice Theory].
- 1967 – Aaron Beck published a psychological model of depression, suggesting that thoughts play a significant role in the development and maintenance of depression.
- 1968 – DSM II published by the American Psychiatric Association.
- 1969 – California School of Professional Psychology established as first freestanding school of professional psychology.
- 1969 – Joseph Wolpe published The Practice of Behavior Therapy.

=== 1970s ===
- 1970 – Arthur Janov published his book The Primal Scream, which outlined his theory of the trauma-based Primal therapy.
- 1971 – Vladimir Bukovsky documented the psychiatric imprisonment of political prisoners in the USSR.

=== 1980s ===
- 1980 – DSM III is published by the American Psychiatric Association.
- 1987 – DSM III-R is published by the American Psychiatric Association.

=== 1990s ===
- 1990 – Michael White and David Epston publish Narrative Means to Therapeutic Ends, the first major text in what later comes to be known as narrative therapy.
- 1991 – The American Psychoanalytic Association passed a resolution opposing "public or private discrimination" against homosexuals. It stopped short, however, of agreeing to open its training institutes to these individuals.
- 1992 – The American Psychoanalytic Association extended the provisions of its 1991 resolution (see above) to training candidates at its affiliated institutes.
- 1994 – DSM IV (The Diagnostic and Statistical Manual of Mental Disorders) published by the American Psychiatric Association.
- 1997 – The American Psychoanalytic Association became the first national mental health organization to support same-sex marriage.

== 21st century ==
=== 2000s ===
- 2000 – The DSM-IV-TR, was published in May 2000 in order to correct several errors in DSM-IV, and to update and change diagnostic codes to reflect the ICD-9-CM coding system.

=== 2010s ===
- 2013 – The Fifth Edition of the Diagnostic and Statistical Manual of Mental Disorders (DSM-5) was released at the American Psychiatric Association's Annual Meeting in May 2013, marking the end of more than a decade's journey in revising the criteria for the diagnosis and classification of mental disorders.

== See also ==
- Psychotherapy
- Timeline of psychology
