= Timeline of psychiatry =

This is a timeline of the modern development of psychiatry. Related information can be found in the Timeline of psychology and Timeline of psychotherapy articles.

== Early history of psychiatry ==
1550 BCE

The Ebers papyrus, one of the most important medical papyri of ancient Egypt, briefly mentioned clinical depression.

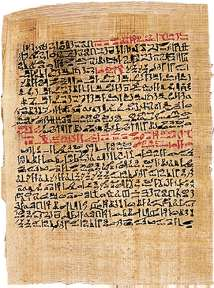
A page from the Ebers Papyrus.

6th century BCE

600 B.C., many cities had temples to Asklepios known as an Asklepieion that provided cures for psychosomatic illnesses

4th century BCE

Greek physician Hippocrates theorized that physiological abnormalities may be the root of mental disorders.

280 BCE

Greek physician and philosopher Herophilus studied the nervous system and distinguished between sensory nerves and motor nerves.

250 BCE

Greek anatomist Erasistratus studied the brain and distinguished between the cerebrum and cerebellum.

9th century

The first bimaristan was built in Baghdad, followed by several others throughout the Arab world. By the 13th century, they had become large, complex, and divided into several different specialized units. A number of these hospitals contained wards for patients with mental illness.

11th century

Persian physician Avicenna recognized "physiological psychology" in the treatment of illnesses involving emotions, and developed a system for associating changes in the pulse rate with inner feelings.

1247

Bethlehem Royal Hospital in Bishopsgate outside the wall of London, one of the most famous old psychiatric hospitals was founded as a priory of the Order of St. Mary of Bethlem to collect alms for Crusaders; after the English government secularized it, it started admitting mental patients by 1377 (1403?), becoming known as Bedlam Hospital; in 1547 it was acquired by the City of London, operating until 1948; it is now part of South London and Maudsley NHS Foundation Trust.

== Psychiatry in the Enlightenment ==
1656

King Louis XIV of France founded Pitié-Salpêtrière Hospital in Paris for prostitutes and the mentally defective.

1672

English physician Thomas Willis published the anatomical treatise De Anima Brutorum, describing psychology in terms of brain function.

1716

As the first governmental institution dedicated to caring for the mentally ill on German territory, the hospital "Chur-Sachisches Zucht-Waysen und Armen-Haus" was opened in Waldheim in 1716.

1724

After being plagued with guilt over the Salem Witch Trials, influential New England Puritan minister Cotton Mather broke with superstition by advancing physical explanations for mental illnesses over demonic explanations.

1758

English physician William Battie published Treatise on Madness, calling for treatments to be utilized on rich and poor mental patients alike in asylums.

1793

French physician Philippe Pinel was appointed to Bicêtre Hospital in south Paris, ordering chains removed from mental patients, and founding Moral Treatment. In 1809 he published the first description of dementia praecox (schizophrenia).

1796

The York Retreat in England was founded by Quakers, becoming known for humane treatment and serving as a model.

== Psychiatry in the 19th century ==
1808

German physician Johann Christian Reil coined the term "psychiatry".

1812

American physician Benjamin Rush became one of the earliest advocates of humane treatment for the mentally ill with the publication of Medical Inquiries and Observations, upon the Diseases of the Mind, the first American textbook on psychiatry.

1821

The element lithium was first isolated from lithium oxide and described by English chemist William Thomas Brande.

1841

What became the Royal College of Psychiatrists, then known as the Association of Medical Officers of Asylums and Hospitals for the Insane, was founded in England, receiving a royal charter in 1926.

1844

The Association of Medical Superintendents of American Institutions for the Insane (AMSAII), the forerunner of the American Psychiatric Association (APA), was founded in Philadelphia, Pennsylvania.

1845

The Lunacy Act 1845 and the County Asylums Act 1845 were passed in England and Wales, leading to the setting up of the Lunacy Commission.

1851

Dr. Samuel Cartwright, a prominent Louisiana physician and one of the leading authorities in his time on the medical care of people referred to as "negroes", identified two mental disorders peculiar to slaves: Drapetomania, or the disease causing slaves to run away; Dysaethesia Aethiopica which proposed a theory for the cause of laziness among slaves. Today, both are considered examples of scientific racism.

1852

French physician Bénédict Augustin Morel published Traite des Maladies Mentales (2 vols.); the 2nd ed. (1860) coined the term "dementia praecox" (demence precoce) for patients with "stupor" (melancholia). In 1857 he published Traité des Dégénérescences, promoting an understanding of mental illness based upon the theory of Degeneration, which became one of the most influential concepts in psychiatry for the rest of the century.

1859

Paul Briquet published Traité clinique et thérapeutique de l’Hystérie.

The first psychiatric clinic in the Russian Empire was organized by Ivan Mikhailovich Balinsky (1827-1902) at the Military Medical Academy in St. Petersburg.

1892

Daniel Hack Tuke edited the first dictionary of psychiatry.

1893

German psychiatrist Emil Kraepelin clinically defined "dementia praecox", later reformulated as schizophrenia.

1895

Sigmund Freud and Josef Breuer of Austria published Studies on Hysteria, based on the case of Bertha Pappenheim (known as Anna O.), developing the Talking Cure; Freud and Breuer later split over Freud's obsession with sex.

1899

The Kraepelinian dichotomy between affective psychosis and dementia praecox (schizophrenia) was introduced in the 6th edition of Emil Kraepelin's famous Lehrbuch.

On 4 November Sigmund Freud published The Interpretation of Dreams (Die Traumdeutung).

== Early 20th century psychiatry ==
1900

Russian neurologist Vladimir Bekhterev discovered the role of the hippocampus in memory.

1901

German psychiatrist Alois Alzheimer identified the first case of what later became known as Alzheimer's disease.

Sigmund Freud published The Psychopathology of Everyday Life.

1902

Swiss-born psychiatrist Adolf Meyer became director of the New York State Psychiatric Institute, influencing American psychiatry with his "common sense" approach which included keeping detailed patient records; he coined the term "mental hygiene".

1905

French psychologists Alfred Binet and Theodore Simon created the Binet-Simon Scale to assess intellectual ability, marking the start of standardized psychological testing.

1906

Russian physiologist Ivan Pavlov published the first Conditioning studies.

1908

The term "Schizophrenia" was coined by Swiss psychiatrist Paul Eugen Bleuler.

1909

In September Sigmund Freud visited Clark University, winning over the U.S. psychiatric establishment.

1910

Sigmund Freud founded the International Psychoanalytical Association (IPA), with Carl Jung as the first president, and Otto Rank as the first secretary.

Boris Sidis opened the Sidis Psychotherapeutic Institute (a private hospital) at Maplewood Farms in Portsmouth, NH for the treatment of nervous patients using the latest scientific methods.

1911

Alfred Adler left Freud's Psychoanalytic Group to form his own school of thought, accusing Freud of overemphasizing sexuality and basing his theory on his own childhood.

The American Psychoanalytic Association (APsaA) was founded.

1913

The British Psychoanalytical Society was founded by Ernest Jones, who became Freud's biographer.

Citing Freud's inability to acknowledge religion and spirituality, Carl Jung split and developed his own theories; his new school of thought became known as Analytical Psychology.

Jacob L. Moreno pioneered Group Psychotherapy methods in Vienna, which emphasized spontaneity and interaction; they later became known as Psychodrama and Sociometry.

1914

Sigmund Freud published On Narcissism: An Introduction.

1917

Sigmund Freud published Introduction to Psychoanalysis, and Mourning and Melancholia.

1920

Swiss psychiatrist Hermann Rorschach developed the Rorschach Inkblot Test.

1921

Sigmund Freud published Group Psychology and the Analysis of the Ego.

1923

German pharmacologist Otto Loewi and English neuroscientist Sir Henry Dale discovered Acetylcholine, the first neurotransmitter to be described, winning them the 1936 Nobel Prize.

1924

German neuropsychiatrist Hans Berger discovered human Electroencephalography.

Otto Rank published The Trauma of Birth, coining the term "pre-Oedipal", causing Freud to break with him.

1926

The Société Psychanalytique de Paris was founded with the endorsement of Sigmund Freud; the Nazis closed it in 1940.

1927

Austrian psychiatrist Manfred Sakel developed Insulin Shock Therapy as a treatment for psychosis; it was discontinued in the 1970s.

Austrian physician Julius Wagner-Jauregg won the Nobel Prize for his invention of malarial therapy as a treatment for general paralysis of the insane (neurosyphilis). He first initiated the treatment in 1917.

1928

Indian Association for Mental Hygiene established.

1933

Hungarian psychiatrist Sándor Ferenczi published a paper claiming that patient accounts of childhood sexual abuse are true, providing a psychological explanation, causing Freud to break with him.

1935

The Indian division of the Royal Medico-Psychological Association was formed due to the efforts of Dr. Banarasi Das.

1938

Italian neurologist Ugo Cerletti and Italian psychiatrist Dr. Lucio Bini discovered Electroconvulsive Therapy.

1942

Swiss psychiatrist Ludwig Binswanger founded Existential Therapy.

The Controversial Discussions between Sigmund Freud's daughter Anna Freud and Melanie Klein, founder of Object Relations Theory caused the British Psychoanalytical Society to permanently split into three camps.

1944

Ritalin (Methylphenidate) was synthesized.

1946

Mary Jane Ward published the novel The Snake Pit, which was filmed in 1948, causing reforms in U.S. state psychiatric hospitals.

1947

Indian Psychiatric Society established.

1948

Lithium carbonate's ability to stabilize mood highs and lows in bipolar mood disorder (manic depression) was demonstrated by Australian psychiatrist John Cade, becoming the first effective medicine for the treatment of mental illness.

1949

Portuguese neurologist Egas Moniz won the Nobel Prize for his work on Lobotomy.

== The era of the new psychopharmacology ==
1950

The World Psychiatric Association was founded.

1952

The first published clinical trial of chlorpromazine which is the first antipsychotic (invented by Henri Laborit, Jean Delay and Pierre Deniker) was conducted at Sainte-Anne Hospital Center in Paris. Known as Largactil in Europe, it was brought to Montreal by Heinz Lehman and named Thorazine.

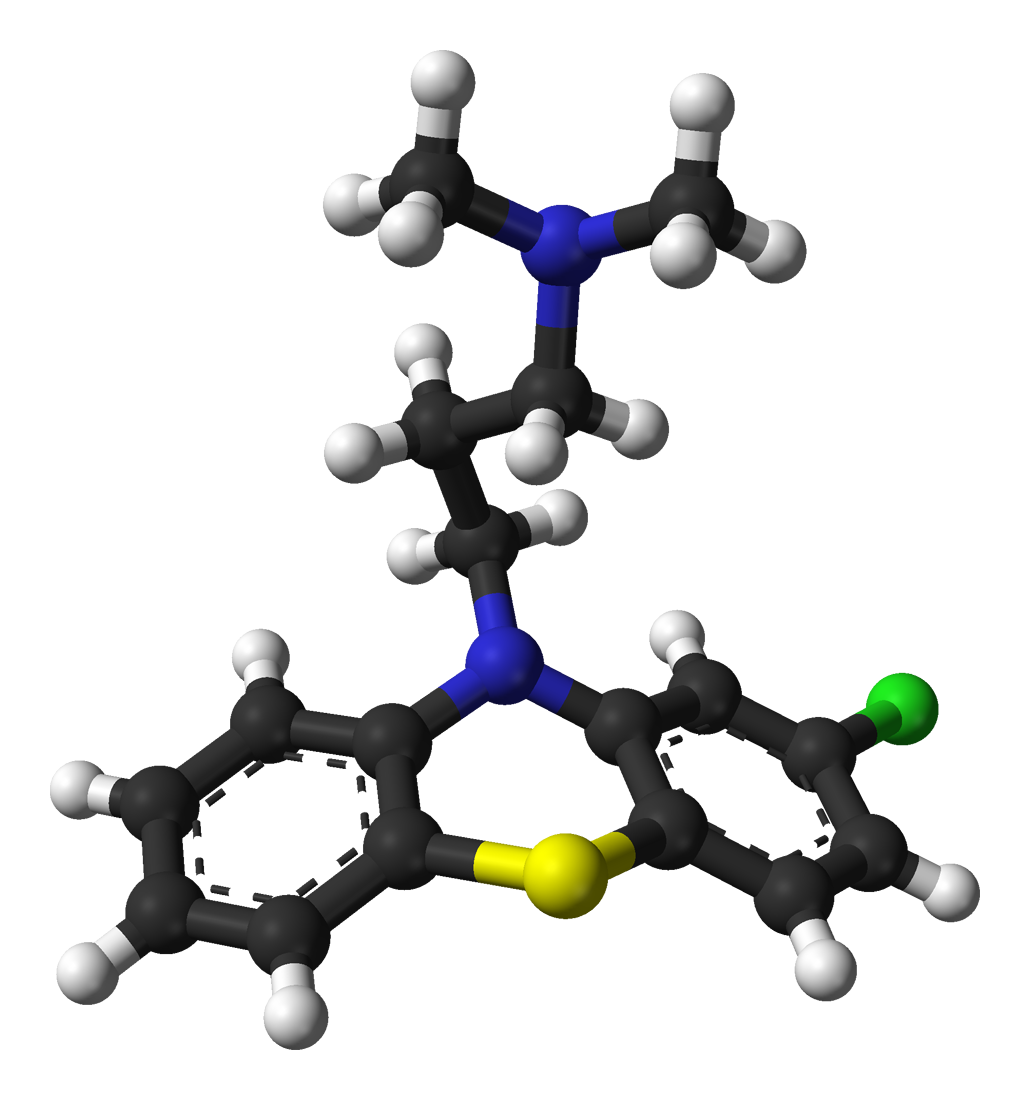
Chlorpromazine's chemical structure.

1952

The American Psychiatric Association (APA) published the first Diagnostic and Statistical Manual of Mental Disorders (DSM); it was revised in 1968, 1980/7, 1994, 2000 and 2013.

1952

The first monoamine oxidase inhibitor (MAOI) antidepressant iproniazid was discovered.

1953

Russian-born physiologist Nathaniel Kleitman of the U. of Chicago discovered Rapid eye movement sleep (REM), founding modern sleep research.

French psychiatrist Jacques Lacan broke with the IPA over his variable-length sessions, and founded the Société Française de Psychanalyse.

1954

James Olds and Peter Milner of McGill University discovered the brain reward system.

Roger Sperry of Caltech began split-brain research.

On the recommendation of the Bhore Committee in 1946, the All India Institute of Mental Health was founded, becoming the National Institute of Mental Health and Neurosciences (NIMHANS) in 1974 at Bangalore.

1956

Gregory Bateson, John Weakland, Donald deAvila Jackson, and Jay Haley proposed the double bind theory of schizophrenia, which regards it as stemming from situations where a person receives different or contradictory messages.

The English translation of The Standard Edition of the Complete Psychological Works of Sigmund Freud was published in 24 volumes (1956–74).

1957

Arvid Carlsson demonstrated that dopamine is a neurotransmitter in the brain.

The first tricyclic antidepressant (TCA), imipramine was discovered.

1958

Aaron B. Lerner et al. of Yale University isolated the hormone melatonin, which was found to regulate the circadian rhythm.

1960s

Aaron T. Beck developed cognitive therapy.

1960

The first benzodiazepine, chlordiazepoxide, under the trade name Librium was introduced.

1961

Professor of psychiatry Thomas Szasz publishes The Myth of Mental Illness.

1963

United States president John F. Kennedy introduced legislation delegating the National Institute of Mental Health to administer Community Mental Health Centers for those being discharged from state psychiatric hospitals.

Medard Boss founded Daseinsanalysis.

1964

Ronald David Laing published Sanity, Madness and the Family, claiming that the roots of schizophrenia lie in the "family nexus", where people play dark games with each other.

1970

The U.S. Food and Drug Administration (FDA) approved lithium for acute mania.

The United States U.S. Controlled Substances Act was passed, putting LSD, DMT, Psilocybin, Mescaline, and Marijuana on Schedule I (no accepted medical use).

1972

American psychologist David Rosenhan published the Rosenhan experiment, a study challenging the validity of psychiatric diagnoses.

1973

The American Psychiatric Association declassified homosexuality as a mental disorder.

1975

The Caucus of Gay, Lesbian, and Bisexual Members of the American Psychiatric Association was officially founded. A primary function of the organization was to advocate to the APA on LGBT mental health issues. The caucus changed its name to the Association of Gay and Lesbian Psychiatrists in 1985.

1977

The ICD-9 was published by the WHO.

Andrey Lichko published Psychopathies and Character Accentuations in Adolescents.

1980

Transgender people were officially classified by the American Psychiatric Association as having "gender identity disorder."

1982

The National Mental Health Programme (NMHP) was launched in India.

1983

The European Psychiatric Association was founded.

1987

The Indian Mental Health Act was drafted by the parliament, but it came into effect in all the states andunion territories of India in April 1993. This act replaced the Indian Lunacy Act of 1912, which had earlier replaced the Indian Lunatic Asylum act of 1858.

1988

Fluoxetine (trade name Prozac), the first selective serotonin reuptake inhibitor (SSRI) antidepressant was released, quickly becoming the most prescribed.

The American Neuropsychiatric Association was founded.

1990

Use of the "blood-oxygen-level dependent" (BOLD) in MRI first discovered by Dr. Seiji Ogawa

1991

Kenneth Kwong successfully applied BOLD to image human brain activities with MRI, and published the findings in 1992.

1994

The appetite-suppressing hormone leptin was discovered.

1996

U.S. President Bill Clinton signed the Mental Health Parity Act, requiring psychiatric conditions to be considered equal to any other medical or surgical illness by health insurance providers; in 2008 President George W. Bush signed an amended version.

== 21st century ==
2000

The No Free Lunch Organization was founded by Dr. Bob Goodman, an internist from New York.

2001

Pakistan Mental Health Act 2001: Since Pakistan’s founding in 1947, the country had relied on the outdated Lunacy Act from 1912. Efforts to reform it began in 1992, but it was not until 2001 that this act was replaced by the Mental Health Ordinance 2001.

The European Brain Council was founded in Brussels.

The term for schizophrenia in Japan was changed from Seishin-Bunretsu-Byō 精神分裂病 (mind-split-disease) to Tōgō-shitchō-shō 統合失調症 (integration disorder) to reduce stigma. The new name was inspired by the biopsychosocial model; it increased the percentage of patients who were informed of the diagnosis from 37% to 70% over three years.

2012

In 2009 America's professional association of endocrinologists established best practices for transgender children that included prescribing puberty-suppressing drugs to preteens followed by hormone therapy beginning at about age 16, and in 2012 the American Academy of Child and Adolescent Psychiatry echoed these recommendations.

The American Psychiatric Association issued official position statements supporting the care and civil rights of transgender and gender non-conforming individuals.

2013

DSM-5 was published by the American Psychiatric Association. Among other things, it eliminated the term "gender identity disorder," which was considered stigmatizing, instead referring to "gender dysphoria," which focuses attention only on those who feel distressed by their gender identity.
