= Occupational Personality Questionnaires =

Personality test

The Occupational Personality Questionnaires, OPQ or OPQ32, are widely used occupational personality questionnaires. The authors were Saville et al., including Roger Holdsworth, Gill Nyfield, Lisa Cramp, and Bill Mabey, and they were launched by Saville and Holdsworth Ltd. in 1984. The series included the first commercially available Big Five instrument.

OPQ32 provides an indication of an individual's preferred behavioural style at work; to help employers gauge how a candidate will fit into certain work environments, how they will work with other people, and how they will cope with different job requirements. It is now available in more than 30 languages and uses item response theory to shorten the questionnaire to under 30 minutes.

The OPQ32 is used in selection, development, team building, succession planning, and organisational change. Independent reviews are available online.

Distribution is done today by SHL Group Limited.
