= Peter Saville (psychologist) =

British psychologist (1946–2022)

Professor Peter Saville
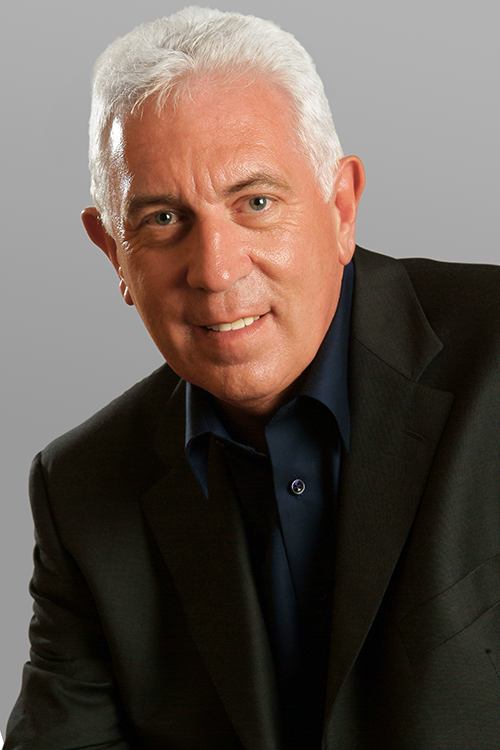
- Saville
- Born: 26 October 1946; London, England
- Died: 5 January 2022 (aged 75)
- Citizenship: British
- Education: PhD
- Occupation: Psychologist
- Known for: Psychometrics
- Honours: British Psychological Society Honorary Fellowship

Peter Francis Saville (26 October 1946 – 5 January 2022) was a British chartered occupational psychologist specialising in psychometrics, personality and talent management.

He co-founded Saville and Holdsworth Ltd (SHL) in 1977. He was founder of the Saville Consulting Group and its chairman from 2006 to 2015, when it was sold to Towers Watson (now Willis Towers Watson).

Saville was an instigator of psychometric testing in the modern workplace and held an Academic Fellowship of the Chartered Institute of Personnel and Development for Leadership and Research Innovation.

== Early life and education ==
Saville was born in Park Royal, London, to a Welsh mother, Winifred Violet Saville, from Rhossili, Gower Peninsula, and an English father, John Edward Saville, from Chiswick, London. He grew up in Alperton, London.

Great Ormond Street Hospital treated Saville for congenital scoliosis from six months of age. The doctors pronounced him cured at the age of seven. As a child, he showed signs of dyslexia because his academic grades were low due to poor spelling. However, when Saville learned to use mnemonics to structure his answers in exams, his grades improved. The Surrey Education authority selected Saville for Ewell High School's grammar stream. Saville took his GCE A-Levels at Ewell Technical College, now known as North East Surrey College of Technology. At the time, students had to choose between a science-based curriculum or an arts-based curriculum. Saville chose an arts-based curriculum but found his way back to science-based subjects through psychometrics, a field of psychology concerned with the theory and technique behind psychological measurement. Saville took his politics A-Level exam early, completing the course in one year. He performed well in the exam, attracting the attention of the University of Leicester who offered him a place. Unfortunately, a sports injury threatened his university application. However, after extensive surgery, Saville took his remaining GCE A-Level examinations and passed the university's entry IQ test. At the time, the University of Leicester had a vibrant psychology department, including Robert Thomson, whose work explored the psychology of thinking and Jim Reason, who developed the Swiss Cheese Model of risk assessment. Saville gained a place on the university's Special Subject Honours Degree program.

He obtained a Special Subject Honours Degree in Psychology from the University of Leicester in 1969 followed by a Master of Philosophy Degree in 1974 and a Doctor of Philosophy in 1977 from Brunel University.

Saville received a scholarship from the National Foundation for Educational Research (NFER) where he pursued his PhD and worked as an assistant psychologist. While at NFER Saville wrote test manuals for number of ability tests, worked on the publication of the first edition of The British Ability Scales and helped to take over the test range of the National Institute of Industrial Psychology. NFER promoted Saville to the role of chief psychologist at their Test Division, here Saville was responsible for adapting and standardising a range of tests for educational, clinical and occupational use. Saville was involved in the acquisition of the tests of The National Institute of Industrial Psychology (NIIP), first founded by Charles Samuel Myers. In his PhD, Saville undertook a Promax factor analysis of Cattell's 16PF Questionnaire, on a sample of two thousand British adults using a sampling methodology proposed by Claus Moser. Factor analysis provided a five variable solution of traits; Anxiety, Extraversion, Warmth, Imagination and Conscientiousness – later known as the Five-factor model (FFM) or Big Five of Personality. Professor Raymond Cattell praised Saville for his contribution to British psychology. Professor Hans Eysenck was Saville's PhD external examiner. Saville's findings caused Eysenck to start an argument with internal examiner Professor Desmond Furneax over the nature of intelligence.

== Career ==
Saville began undertaking psychological assessments and providing psychological testing training to private organisations. The British Psychological Society approved Saville's five-day Occupational Testing Course in 1974. In 1977 Saville formed a company with Roger Holdsworth called Saville and Holdsworth Ltd (SHL). Saville held sixty-five per cent of SHL shares while Holdsworth held the remaining 35%. Initially, the company worked out of Saville's home in Claygate, Esher, Surrey. The company set about creating scientifically sound psychometric measures that were pleasing to the eye and quick to administer. Saville hired his brother, a graphic designer to design SHL's first line of tests. In 1984, Saville, along with Holdsworth, Cramp, Nyfield and Mabey published the Occupational Personality Questionnaires (OPQ). Developed for use in workplace settings, the original OPQ contained four different versions. The Pentagon model measured five scales. The Octagon, Factor and Concept versions of the OPQ measured respectively 8, 16 and 30 scales. Previously, employers widely used personality tests created by Raymond Cattell. The OPQ was specifically related to assess an individual's suitability for different types of work. Saville left SHL in 2003 following a boardroom dispute after SHL's share price crashed. SHL's board of directors wanted co-founder Holdsworth to step down. Holdsworth refused to step down, Saville backed him up along with the external shareholder, Manpower. During a general meeting, Saville put forward a motion to oust the company's new chief executive. Because SHL staff were also shareholders, they were allowed a vote. However, despite most of the staff voting to oust the new leaders, the motion failed by a narrow margin.

In 2004 he founded his second company, Saville Consulting Group, now Saville Assessment. SHL attempted to stop Saville from legally using his name for his new company, but failed after Saville took legal action.

Saville was professor of occupational psychology at Queen's University from 1990 to 1998, and was latterly a visiting professor of Talent Management and Leadership at Kingston Business School. In 2015, Towers Watson took over Saville Consulting, stating that combining the latter's online tools and their own engagement and talent software would "help companies that want efficient, technology-enabled solutions to identify and develop talent". Saville started a new company, 10x Psychology, in September that year.

== Personal life and death ==
He was twice married and had five children. Saville died on 5 January 2022, at the age of 75.

== Awards ==
Saville was an Academic Fellow of The Chartered Institute of Personnel and Development (UK).

In November 2015, Saville was awarded Lifetime Membership and Honorary Membership of the Association of Business Psychologists.

Saville was awarded a Doctor of Science Honoris Causa (Hon. Dr. Sc.) for outstanding services to Occupational Psychology by Kingston University in July 2016.

In 2001, Saville received the British Psychological Society's Centenary Award for Distinguished Contributions to Professional Psychology.

In August 2012, the British Psychological Society awarded Saville an Honorary Fellowship, its highest award.

== Publications ==
=== Books ===
- Saville, P., Hopton, T., World Anthology of Psychologists Series: From Obscurity to Transparency in Psychometrics – Collected Writings of Peter Saville 1972–2015, Routledge, London, UK.
- Saville, P., Blinkhorn, S., Undergraduate personality by factored scales: a large scale study on Cattell's 16 PF and the Eysenck personality inventory, NFER Publishing Company

=== Journals ===
- Peter Saville, Eric Willson. The reliability and validity of normative and ipsative approaches in the measurement of personality, Journal of Occupational Psychology
