= Jerome Kagan =

American psychologist (1929–2021)

- Born: February 25, 1929; Newark, New Jersey, U.S.
- Died: May 10, 2021 (aged 92)
- Education: Rutgers University (BS); Harvard University (MA); Yale University (PhD)
- Scientific career
- Fields: Developmental psychology
- Workplaces: Ohio State University; Harvard University
- Doctoral students: Adele Diamond; David Moore; Nora Newcombe
- Website: necsi.edu/faculty/kagan.html

Jerome Kagan (February 25, 1929 – May 10, 2021) was an American psychologist, who was the Daniel and Amy Starch Research Professor of Psychology at Harvard University, as well as, co-faculty at the New England Complex Systems Institute. He was one of the key pioneers of developmental psychology.

Kagan has shown that an infant's "temperament" is quite stable over time, in that certain behaviors in infancy are predictive of certain other behavior patterns in adolescence. He did extensive work on temperament and gave insight on emotion.

In 2001, he was listed in the Review of General Psychology among the one hundred most eminent psychologists of the twentieth century. After being evaluated quantitatively and qualitatively, Kagan was twenty-second on the list, just above Carl Jung.

== Biography ==
Born in Newark, New Jersey, to Myrtle and Joseph Kagan, Jerome Kagan grew up in Rahway, New Jersey. After his graduation from Rahway High School in 1946, he chose to study psychology because he was attracted to being a scientist and he wanted to preserve his grandfather's interest in human nature. He earned a B.S. degree from Rutgers University in 1950. While at Yale University, he assisted Frank Beach, a well-respected researcher. He earned his master's degree from Harvard University. He then was accepted at Yale University to study psychology, where he earned his Ph.D.

After his graduation from Yale University, he accepted his first faculty position at Ohio State University. Six months later, in 1955, he was recruited to be a part of the research team at the U.S. Army Hospital during the Korean War. Once he had finished his time at the U.S. Army Hospital, the director of the Fels Research Institute contacted Kagan to ask him to direct a project that was funded by the National Institutes of Health, which he accepted. After that project was completed, he accepted the offer he received from Harvard University to be involved in creating the first human development program. With the exception of a leave taken from 1971 to 1972 to study children in San Marcos, once he moved to Harvard, he remained there as a professor until retirement.

Kagan won the Hofheimer Prize, awarded by the American Psychiatric Association in 1963. In 1995, he won the G. Stanley Hall Award of the American Psychological Association (APA).

== Research ==
While at the Fels Research Institute, Kagan did extensive research on personality traits that begin with infancy and continue through adulthood. He examined whether or not early experiences of the participants affected their future personalities talents, and characters. Kagan researched all of the longitudinal information that was prepared, specifically, the responses to intelligence tests that were administered to them. When Kagan was reviewing the material collected in childhood and adulthood, he found that the first three years in childhood showed little relation to the data collected in adulthood. The results of the Fels study was discussed in Kagan's book, entitled Birth to Maturity, that was published in 1962.

Kagan's next research was in San Marcos, Guatemala. During that study, Kagan discovered that biological factors play a huge role in development and an even larger role in child development. Specifically, he found that these children had slower psychological development when in their homes due to their restricted experiences. Once the children were walking and could leave the home, Kagan found that the psychological delay in development was only temporary, suggesting that cognitive growth is malleable.

In 2010, Kagan was involved in a similar study that focused on specific parts of the brain involved in behavioral inhibition in infants. Schwartz et al. (2010) performed a longitudinal study involving eighteen-year-olds and used neuroimaging to detect whether or not the ventromedial or orbitofrontal cerebral cortex are associated with the high or low reactivity of what they demonstrated when four-months-old. After undergoing a battery of tests, the infants were categorized into two groups: low-reactive and high-reactive temperament. Results showed that the adults who had low-reactive infant temperaments had greater thickness in the left orbitofrontal cortex than the high-reactive group. The adults categorized as high-reactive infants displayed greater thickness in the right ventromedial prefrontal cortex.

While at Harvard University, Kagan studied infants up to two years of age and published his work in his book, The Second Year. Kagan's research found that there were major changes in psychological functioning between nineteen and twenty-four months, and that one-year-old children were sensitive to events that deviated from their normal experiences. Kagan also examined the effects of infant daycare in response to a congressional proposal to fund federal day care centers for working mothers. Richard Kearsley, Philip Zelazo, and Kagan created their own daycare in Boston's Chinatown, and compared infants in their day care center to infants who stayed at home with their mothers. Focusing on cognitive functioning, language, attachment, separation protest, and play tempo, this research revealed very little difference between the infants in day care and those whose mothers stayed at home with them.

=== Emotion ===
Kagan proposed that emotion is a psychological phenomenon controlled by brain states and that specific emotions are products of context, personal history, and biological make-up. Kagan also explained emotion as occurring in four distinct phases, including the brain state (created by an incentive), the detection of changes in bodily movement, the appraisal of a change in bodily feeling, and the observable changes in facial expression and muscle tension. These emotions vary in magnitude and usually differ across ages and when expressed in different contexts.

Kagan questioned relying on individual's verbal statements of their feelings. He provided several reasons for this; he argued that the English language does not have enough words to describe all emotional states, the words to explain emotional states do not convey the differences in quality or severity, and attempts to translate words about emotion from one language to another produces variations and inaccuracies. In addition, Kagan argued that research in emotion studies should be free of ambiguous and coded terms. This emphasis on specificity remained a recurring theme in his later research on emotion. He called for a moratorium on the use of single words (e.g. fear) to write about emotional processes, urging experts to use full sentences instead.

=== Temperament ===
According to Kagan, (conventionally):

temperament refers to stable behavioral and emotional reactions that appear early and are influenced in part by genetic constitution.

—

The study of temperament is perhaps what Kagan is best known for. He began his work on temperament after his research in Guatemala. Kagan primarily focused on children's fear and apprehension. He defined two types of temperament; inhibited and uninhibited. Inhibited refers to a shy, timid, and fearful profile of a child, whereas uninhibited refers to the appearance of bold, sociable, and outgoing behaviours. Kagan found that at four months, inhibited infants tend to fuss and show heightened responses to novel objects (e.g. brightly colored toy) and display intense physiological arousal to situations that barely attract a response from uninhibited infants. In Kagan's first published work on behaviourally inhibited children, he established the connection between his work on behavioural inhibition to the works of neuroscientists such as Joseph LeDoux and Michael Davis.

In 2008, Kagan and several other researchers conducted a study to examine whether behavioral inhibition in adulthood can be predicted by certain behavioral characteristics in infants. The research hypothesized that the frequency of infant reactivity, based on motor and crying dimensions, is predictive of behavioral inhibition. As a result of his ground-breaking work on temperament, we know that these characteristics have the ability to influence later behavior, depending on how they interact with the environment. Kagan also believed that there is no guarantee of an indefinitely stable profile considering that environmental factors are always changing and that both genes and environmental factors influence a child's temperament

== Publications ==
Articles, contributions, essays, and reports authored by Kagan include:

- Personality and the learning Process (1965)
- Reflection- Impulsivity and Reading Ability in Primary Grade Children (1965)
- On the Need for Relativism, American Psychologist, 1967, 22, 131-142
- Personal Development (1971)
- The growth of the child. Reflections on human development (1978)
- The Nature of the Child. Basic Books (1982) ISBN 0465048501
- An argument for mind (2006)
- What is emotion?: History, measures, and meanings (2007)
- In defense of Qualitative Changes in Development (2008)
- The three cultures: Natural sciences, social sciences, and the humanities in the 21st century (2009)
- Once more into the Breach (2010)
- The temperamental thread. How genes, culture, time, and luck make us who we are (2010)
- Trad. esp.: El temperamento y su trama. Cómo los genes, la cultura, el tiempo y el azar inciden en nuestra personalidad, Buenos Aires/Madrid, Katz editores, 2011, ISBN 978-84-92946-32-7

Books authored or co-authored by Kagan include:

- Birth to Maturity (1962)
- Understanding Children: Behavior, Motives, and Thought (1971)
- The Second Year: The Emergence of Self-Awareness (1981)
- Unstable Ideas: Temperament, Cognition, and Self (1989)
- Galen’s prophecy: Temperament in human nature (1994)
- Three Seductive Ideas (2000)
- A Young Mind in a Growing Brain (2005)
- Developing Cultures: Essays On Cultural Change (co-editor with Samuel P. Huntington) (2006)
- Psychology's Ghosts: The Crisis in the Profession and the Way Back (2012)
- Kinds Come First (2019)
- A Trio of Pursuits: Puzzles in Human Development (2021)
