= The Nature of the Child =

1984 book by Jerome Kagan

- Author: Jerome Kagan
- Subject: Developmental psychology
- Publisher: Basic Books
- Publication date: 1984
- Pages: 309
- ISBN: 0465048501

The Nature of the Child is a 1984 book by American psychologist Jerome Kagan. In a series of essays, Kagan challenges beliefs in child rearing and developmental psychology, namely that negative or positive attachments to parents necessarily results in a child's wellbeing as they mature. Kagan argues that such beliefs are unsupported and that a child's temperament relies more on biology and cognitive development.

== Commentary and reviews ==
- Berlin, Irving N. (January 1986). "Review of The nature of the child,". American Journal of Orthopsychiatry. 56 (1): 153–155. doi:10.1111/j.1939-0025.1986.tb01553.x.
- Broyard, Anatole (14 September 1984). "Books of The Times". The New York Times.
- Cook, Sarah Sheets (March 1986). "The nature of the child By Jerome Kagan". Journal of Nurse-Midwifery. 31 (2): 115–116. doi:10.1016/0091-2182(86)90115-1.
- Goleman, Daniel (18 November 1984). "Not The Father of The Man". The New York Times.
- Herzog, James (January 1986). "Book reviews: The Nature of the Child". The International Journal of Psychoanalysis. 67: 380–382.
- Holyoke, T. C. (1986). "The Nature of the Child review". The Antioch Review. 44 (2): 244. doi:10.2307/4611604.
- Kadushin, Alfred (1987). "Review of The Nature of the Child". Social Service Review. 61 (3): 544–546. ISSN 0037-7961.
- Peterson, Steven (July 1985). "The nature of the child By Jerome Kagan. New York: Basic Books, 1984". Journal of Social and Biological Systems. 8 (3): 302–303. doi:10.1016/0140-1750(85)90077-6.
- Roberts, Sam (21 May 2021). "Jerome Kagan, Who Tied Temperament to Biology, Dies at 92". The New York Times.
- Schaffer, H. R. (1 November 1985). "Review of The Nature of the Child". British Journal of Psychology. 76 (4): 542–543.
- Storr, Anthony (5 November 1984). "The child is father to the man". The New Republic. 19 (191): 40.
- Tavris, Carol (3 November 1984). "New Hope for Freud Sufferers". The Nation. 239 (14): 454–457.
- Thorne, Barrie (1986). "Review of The Nature of the Child". Contemporary Sociology. 15 (3): 413–414. doi:10.2307/2070043. ISSN 0094-3061.
