= William Glasser =

American psychiatrist

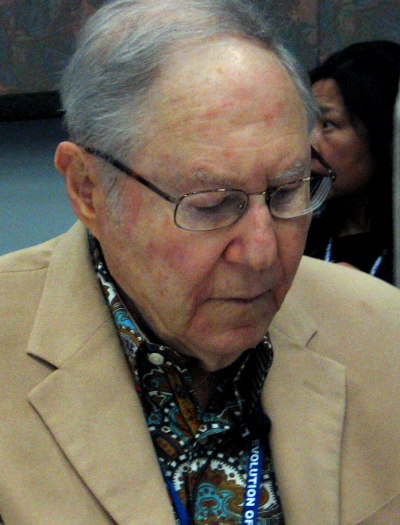
- Glasser at the 2009 Evolution of Psychotherapy Conference
- Born: May 11, 1925; Cleveland, Ohio, U.S.
- Died: August 23, 2013 (aged 88); Los Angeles, California, U.S.
- Education: Case Western Reserve University; University of California, Los Angeles
- Known for: developed reality therapy and choice theory
- Awards: Doctor of Humane Letters, Honoris Causa, University of San Francisco, American Counseling Association Professional Development Award, American Psychotherapy Association Master Therapist
- Scientific career
- Fields: Psychiatry; Counseling
- Workplaces: California State University, Northridge; William Glasser Institute; Institute for Reality Therapy

William Glasser (May 11, 1925 – August 23, 2013) was an American psychiatrist. He was the developer of W. Edwards Deming's workplace ideas, reality therapy and choice theory. His innovations for individual counseling, work environments and school, highlight personal choice, personal responsibility and personal transformation. Glasser positioned himself in opposition to conventional mainstream psychiatrists, who focus instead on classifying psychiatric syndromes as "illnesses" and prescribe psychotropic medications to treat mental disorders.

Based on his wide-ranging and consulting clinical experience, Glasser applied his theories to broader social issues, such as education, management, and marriage, to name a few. As a public advocate, Glasser warned the general public of potential detriments caused by older generations of psychiatry, wedded to traditional diagnosing of patients as having mental illnesses (brain disorders) and prescribing medications. In his view, patients simply act out their unhappiness and lack of meaningful personal connection with important people in their life. Glasser advocated educating the general public about mental health issues; offering, post-modern frameworks for finding and following healthy therapeutic direction.

== Early life and career ==
Glasser was born on May 11, 1925, in Cleveland, Ohio, to Ben Glasser, a watch and clock repairman, and his wife Betty. He attended Case Western Reserve University in Cleveland, where in 1945 he earned his BS in chemical engineering. After a short career as an engineer, Glasser returned in 1946 to Case Western, but instead, during his first semester, was drafted into the US Army and stationed at Dugway Proving Ground in Utah. He returned to Case Western in 1947, earning his MA in clinical psychology in 1949 and his MD in psychiatry in 1953. He completed his medical internship and psychiatric residency at UCLA and the Veterans Administration Hospital, respectively, and became board certified in 1961.

After being "thrown off the staff" at the VA hospital due to his anti-Freudian beliefs, Glasser took a position as staff psychiatrist at the Ventura School for Delinquent Girls, where he began teaching ideas that became the basis for reality therapy. During this time, Glasser met G. L. Harrington, an older psychiatrist who openly disbelieved the Freudian model of mental illness, whom Glasser credits as being his "mentor".

Glasser set up a private psychotherapy practice in Los Angeles, which he maintained until 1986.

== Work ==
Glasser authored and co-authored numerous and influential books on mental health, counseling, school improvement, and teaching, and several publications advocating a public health approach to or emphasis within mental health versus the prevailing "medical" model.

Glasser founded the Institute for Reality Therapy in 1967, which was renamed the Institute for Control Theory, Reality Therapy and Lead Management in 1994 and later the William Glasser Institute in 1996 in Chatsworth, CA. The institute is now located in Tempe, Arizona, and has branch institutes throughout the world.

By the 1970s Glasser called his body of work "Control Theory". By 1996, the theoretical structure evolved into a comprehensive body of work renamed "Choice Theory", mainly because of the confusion with perceptual control theory by William T. Powers, developed in the 1950s.

== Reality therapy organizations ==
In the United States, the Glasser Institute was originally organized with regional groups in New England, the Sunbelt, the Northwest, the Midwest, the Southeast, and the West Coast.

In July 2010 the William Glasser Association International (WGAI) was established in Nashville, Kentucky, with an interim governing board charged with setting up the organization to coordinate worldwide activities and conferences, the first of which was in 2012 in Los Angeles. The board eventually became incorporated in California under the new name of William Glasser International (WGI) and is the umbrella body recognised by Glasser to represent his ideas around the world. The members of the WGI Board are elected by members.

Outside of the United States, William Glasser International (WGI) has active affiliate organizations in many countries including Canada, Croatia, Slovenia, Ireland, the UK, Finland, Malaysia, the Philippines, South Korea, Japan, Central and South America, South Africa, Australia and New Zealand. Neither WGI nor its affiliate organisations confer titles such as "counsellor" or "therapist" in their regular certification courses. In Europe, however, there are two special courses offering by the European Institute for Reality Therapy, one leading to the title Reality Therapy Psychotherapist and the other to obtain the title Reality Therapy Counsellor. Both can lead to The European Certificate in Psychotherapy (ECP).

The William Glasser Institute UK (formally Institute for Reality Therapy UK), with its own administration executive, coordinates the faculty workshops and practicums in the United Kingdom on behalf of WGI International, leading up to and including Reality Therapy Certification (CTRTC). The WGI UK strives to promote and develop choice theory, reality therapy, and lead management in the UK, offering guidance and support to its membership made up of a body of like-minded individuals, committed to their own personal and professional advancement. Support is offered by a team of training and practicum supervisors. Members of the institute subscribe to the "ethos" that Choice Theory, Reality Therapy, and Lead Management guide and support their relationships both on a personal and professional basis, and that Reality Therapy should be taught with integrity and adherence to fundamental concepts as described by Glasser and others who write, teach, and are associated with WG International.

== Death ==
Glasser died at his home in Los Angeles on August 23, 2013, in the company of his wife, Carleen, and others. Glasser's obituary reported the cause of death as respiratory failure stemming from pneumonia. The William Glasser Institute website referred to Glasser's death as "a massive shock to all", despite him having been "in poor health for some time".

== Bibliography ==
- Mental Health or Mental Illness? Psychiatry for Practical Action, 1962 ISBN 0-06-091092-5
- Reality Therapy : A New Approach to Psychiatry, 1965 ISBN 0-06-090414-3
- Schools Without Failure, 1969 ISBN 0-06-090421-6
- The Effect of School Failure on the Life of a Child, 1971
- The Identity Society, 1972 ISBN 0-601-15726-5 (revised edition published in 1975, ISBN 0-06-090446-1)
- Positive Addiction, 1976 ISBN 0-06-091249-9
- Stations of the Mind, 1981 ISBN 0-06-011478-9
- Take Effective Control of Your Life, 1984 ISBN 0-06-015342-3 (re-issued in 1985 as Control Theory, ISBN 0-06-091292-8)
- Control Theory in the Classroom, 1986 ISBN 0-06-095287-3 (revised edition published in 1998 as Choice Theory in the Classroom, ISBN 0-060-95287-3)
- The Quality School, 1990 ISBN 0-06-095286-5 (expanded edition published in 1992 ISBN 0-06-096955-5)
- The Quality School Teacher, 1992 ISBN 0-06-095285-7 (revised edition published in 1998 ISBN 0-06-095285-7)
- The Control Theory Manager, 1994 ISBN 0-88730-719-1
- Staying Together, 1995 ISBN 0-06-092699-6
- Choice Theory: A New Psychology of Personal Freedom, 1997 ISBN 0-06-093014-4
- Reality Therapy in Action, 2000 (re-issued in 2001 as Counseling with Choice Theory ISBN 0-06-095366-7)
- Every Student Can Succeed, 2000 ISBN 1-58275-051-3
- Fibromyalgia: Hope from a Completely New Perspective, 2001 ISBN 0-9678444-2-8
- Unhappy Teenagers: A Way for Parents and Teachers to Reach Them, 2002 ISBN 0-06-000798-2 (re-issued in 2003 as For Parents and Teenagers: Dissolving the Barrier Between You and Your Teen, ISBN 0-06-000799-0)
- Warning: Psychiatry Can Be Hazardous to Your Mental Health, 2004 ISBN 0-06-053866-X
- Take Charge of Your Life: How to get What You Need with Choice Theory Psychology, 2013 ISBN 978-1938908-32-3

=== With co-author Naomi Glasser ===
- What are you doing?: How people are helped through reality therapy: Cases, 1980 ISBN 0-06-011646-3 (published in 1982 with Instructor's Guide ISBN 0-06-090947-1)
- Control theory in the practice of reality therapy: case studies, 1989 ISBN 0-06-055174-7

=== With co-author Carleen Glasser ===
- The Language of Choice Theory, 1999 ISBN 0-06-095323-3
- What Is This Thing Called Love?, 2000 ISBN 0-9678444-0-1
- Getting Together and Staying Together, 2000 ISBN 0-06-095633-X
- Eight Lessons for a Happier Marriage, 2007 ISBN 978-0-06-133692-8

=== Other ===
- Both-Win Management: A Practical Approach to Improving Employee Performance, Using the 8-Step RPM Program, 1980 ISBN 0-690-01809-6, co-authored with Chester Karrass

=== Chapters in books edited by others ===
- Chapter 4: Reality Therapy: An Explanation of the Steps of Reality Therapy, in What Are You Doing?, 1980, edited by Naomi Glasser ISBN 0-06-011646-3
- Several chapters (not numbered), in The Reality Therapy Reader 1976, edited by Thomas Bratter and Richard Rachin, ISBN 0-06-010238-1
  - p38 "Youth in Rebellion: Why?"
  - p50 "A Talk with William Glasser"
  - p58 "The Civilized Identity Society"
  - p68 "How to Face Failure and Find Success"
  - p92 "Notes on Reality Therapy"
  - p345 "Practical Psychology G.P.s Can Use"
  - p359 "A New Look At Discipline"
  - p382 "Roles, Goals and Failure"
  - p465 "What Children Need"
  - p490 "The Role of the Leader in Counseling" (co-authored with Norman Iverson)
  - p498 "Discipline as a Function of Large Group Meetings" (co-authored with Norman Iverson)
  - p510 "A Realistic Approach to the Young Offender"

== Sources ==
- Jim Roy, William Glasser: Champion of Choice, 2014 ISBN 978-1934442470
