= Introduction to Psychoanalysis =

Set of lectures by Sigmund Freud

- Author: Sigmund Freud
- Original title: Vorlesungen zur Einführung in die Psychoanalyse
- Language: German
- Subject: Psychoanalysis
- Published: 1916–17
- Media type: Print

Introduction to Psychoanalysis or Introductory Lectures on Psycho-Analysis (German: Einführung in die Psychoanalyse) is a set of lectures given by Sigmund Freud, the founder of psychoanalysis, in 1915–1917 (published 1916–1917, in English 1920). The 28 lectures offer an elementary stock-taking of his views of the unconscious, dreams, and the theory of neuroses at the time of writing, as well as offering some new technical material to the more advanced reader.

The lectures became the most popular and widely translated of his works. However, some of the positions outlined in Introduction to Psychoanalysis would subsequently be altered or revised in Freud's later work; and in 1932 he offered a second set of seven lectures numbered from 29 to 35—New Introductory Lectures on Psychoanalysis—as complement (though these were never read aloud and featured a different, sometimes more polemical style of presentation).

== Contents ==
In his three-part Introductory Lectures, by beginning with a discussion of Freudian slips in the first part, moving on to dreams in the second, and only tackling the neuroses in the third, Freud succeeded in presenting his ideas as firmly grounded in the common-sense world of everyday experience. Making full use of the lecture-form, Freud was able to engage in a lively polemic with his audience, constantly engaging the reader/listener in a discussion, so as to take on their views and deal with their possible objections. The work allows the reader acquainted with the concepts of Freud to trace the logic of his arguments afresh and follow his conclusions, backed as they were with examples from life and from clinical practice. But Freud also identified elements of his theory requiring further elaboration, as well as bringing in new material, for example, on symbolism and primal fantasies, taking up with the latter a train of thought he would continue in his re-working of "The Wolf Man".

In the New Introductory Lectures, those on dreams and anxiety/instinctual life offered clear accounts of Freud's latest thinking, while the role of the super-ego received an update in lecture 31. More popular treatments of occultism, psychoanalytic applications and its status as a science helped complete the volume.

== Appraisals ==
Karl Abraham considered the lectures elementary in the best sense, for presenting the core elements of psychoanalysis in an accessible way. G. Stanley Hall in his preface to the 1920 American translation wrote:

These twenty-eight lectures to laymen are elementary and almost conversational. Freud sets forth with a frankness almost startling the difficulties and limitations of psychoanalysis, and also describes its main methods and results as only a master and originator of a new school of thought can do. These discourses are at the same time simple and almost confidential, and they trace and sum up the results of thirty years of devoted and painstaking research. While they are not at all controversial, we incidentally see in a clearer light the distinctions between the master and some of his distinguished pupils.

Freud himself was typically self-deprecating about the finished work, describing it privately as "coarse work, intended for the multitude".

== Influence ==
Max Schur, who became Freud's personal physician, was present at the original 1915 lectures, and drew a lifelong interest in psychoanalysis from them. Karl Jaspers turned from a supporter to opponent of psychoanalysis, after being especially struck in the Introductory Lectures by Freud's claim that his technique could be applied to mythology and to cultural study, as much as to the neuroses.
