= Reality therapy =

Psychotherapy and counseling approach

Reality therapy (RT) is an approach to psychotherapy and counseling developed by William Glasser in the 1960s. It differs from conventional psychiatry, psychoanalysis and medical model schools of psychotherapy in that it focuses on what Glasser calls "psychiatry's three Rs" – realism, responsibility, and right-and-wrong – rather than mental disorders. Reality therapy maintains that most people suffer from socially universal human conditions rather than individual mental illnesses, and that failure to attain basic needs leads to a person's behavior moving away from the norm. Since fulfilling essential needs is part of a person's present life, reality therapy does not concern itself with a person's past. Neither does this type of therapy deal with unconscious mental processes.

The reality therapy approach to counseling and problem-solving focuses on here-and-now actions and the ability to create and choose a better future. Typically, counseled people seek to discover what they really want and how they are currently choosing to behave in order to achieve these goals. According to Glasser, the social component of psychological disorders has been overlooked in the rush to label the population as sick or mentally ill. If a social problem causes distress to a person, it is not always because of a labelled sickness, it may sometimes just be the inability to satisfy one's psychological needs. Reality therapy attempts to separate the person from their behavior.

== History ==
Reality therapy was developed at the Veterans Administration hospital in Los Angeles in the early 1960s by William Glasser and his mentor and teacher, psychiatrist G. L. Harrington. In 1965, Glasser published the book Reality Therapy in the United States. The term refers to a process that is people-friendly and people-centered and has nothing to do with giving people a dose of reality (as a threat or punishment), but rather helps people to recognize how fantasy can distract them from their choices they control in life. Glasser posits that the past is not something to be dwelled upon but rather to be resolved and moved past in order to live a more fulfilling and rewarding life. By the 1970s, the concepts were extended into what Glasser then called "control theory", a term used in the title of several of his books. By the mid-1990s, the still evolving concepts were described as "choice theory", a term conceived and proposed by the Irish reality therapy practitioner Christine O'Brien Shanahan at the 1995 IRTI Conference in Waterford, Ireland and subsequently adopted by Glasser. The practice of reality therapy remains a cornerstone of the larger body of his work. Choice theory asserts that each of us is a self-determining being who can choose (many of our) future behaviors and hold ourselves consciously responsible for how we are acting, thinking, feeling, and also for our physiological states. Choice theory attempts to explain, or give an account of, how each of us attempts to control our world and those within that world.

In 2007, reality therapy was recognised as a legitimate psychotherapeutic approach in Europe, recognised by the European Association for Psychotherapy (EAP), thanks to the publication Scientific Argument for Reality Therapy by Leon Lojk, a Slovenian psychologist and psychotherapist.

== Approach ==
According to Glasser, human beings have four basic psychological needs after survival: the most important need being to love and be loved by another person or group for a feeling of belonging; the need for power, through learning, achieving, feeling worthwhile, winning and through being competent; the need for freedom, including independence and autonomy while simultaneously exercising personal responsibility; the need for fun, pleasure seeking enjoyment and relaxation is also a very important need for good psychological health.

One of the core principles of reality therapy is that, whether people are aware of it or not, they are always trying to meet these essential human needs. These needs must all be balanced and met for a person to function most effectively. However, people don't necessarily act effectively at achieving these goals. Socializing with others is one effective way of meeting the need to belong. But how a person chooses to interact with and gain attention and love from others is most often at the root of their psychological dismay. Reality therapy stresses one major point—people are in control of what they are currently doing in their lives whether or not it is working in their favor toward meeting their basic psychological needs for power, belonging, fun and freedom. And it is through an individual's choices that he or she makes change happen for the better or worse.

For most people in the United States, the survival need is normally being met. It is then in how people meet the remaining four psychological needs that they typically run into trouble. Reality therapy holds that the key to behavior is to remain aware of what an individual presently wants and make choices that will ensure that goal. Reality therapy maintains that what really drives human beings is their need to belong and to be loved. What also drives humans is their yearnings to be free, and with that freedom comes great responsibility (one cannot exist without the other). Reality therapy is very much a therapy of decision (or choice) and change, based upon the conviction that, even though human persons often have let themselves become products of their past's powerful influences, they need not be held forever hostage by those earlier influences.

== Role played by the therapist ==
Reality therapy seeks to treat patients who face difficulty in working out a relationship with others. So, the formation of a connection of the patient with the therapist is regarded as an important milestone at the start of the therapy. According to the therapists, bonding of the patients with their therapists is the most crucial dynamic that would facilitate the healing process. As soon as this bonding is stable, it can help to form a fulfilling connection outside the therapeutic environment.

This type of therapeutic treatment is designed to teach methods for strengthening relationships without relying on the therapist’s involvement. The skills learned can then be applied to interpersonal interactions in daily life.

Reality therapists say that when patients are able to use the skills, behaviors, actions, and methods learned through the therapy in their personal lives, then they will be able to successfully work out external relationships as well. This will provide them with the satisfaction of leading a more fulfilling life.

== Core ideas ==
=== Action ===
Glasser believes that there are five basic needs of all human beings: survival, love and belonging, power, freedom or independence, and fun/pleasure. Reality therapy maintains that the main reason a person is in pain and acting out is because he/she lacks that one important 'other being' to connect with, or lacks another basic need for survival. Glasser believes the need for love and belonging is the most primary need because we all need other people in our lives in order to satisfy the rest of our needs. Therefore, in a cooperative therapeutic relationship, the therapist must create an environment where it is possible for the client to feel connected to another 'responsible' person (the therapist) whom they actually like and might choose as a friend in their real life.

Reality therapy maintains that the core problem of psychological distress is that one or more of the client's essential needs are not being met thereby causing the client to act irresponsibly or make poor choices. The therapist then addresses this issue and asserts that the client assume responsibility for their behavior. Reality therapy asserts that we learn responsibility through involvement with other responsible people. We can learn and re-learn responsibility at any time in life". The therapist focuses on realistic attainable goals in order to remedy the real life issues that are causing discomfort.

William Glasser's choice theory is composed of four aspects: thinking, acting, feeling, and physiology. We can directly choose our thoughts and our actions; we have great difficulty in directly choosing our feelings and our physiology (physical effects such as sweaty palms, headaches, nervous tics, racing pulse, etc.).

A first step is the client learning how to use their emotions and feelings to self-evaluate. The client must realize that something must change; realize and accept that change is possible and can lead to a plan for making better choices. The therapist helps the client create a workable plan to reach a goal; this is at the heart of reality therapy. It must be the client's plan, not the counselor's. The essence of a workable plan is that the client can implement it. It is based on factors under the client's control. Reality therapy strives to empower people by emphasizing the power of doing what is under their control. Doing is at the heart of reality therapy.

=== Behavior ===
Behavior is an immediate and live source of information about whether we are happy with what is going on in our lives. It is very hard to choose to change our emotions directly, thus it is much easier to change our thinking, which will lead to more positive emotions. The client must make a conscious decision to alter his/her thought process. For example, to consciously decide that we will no longer think of ourselves as victims, or to decide that in our thoughts we will concentrate on what we can do rather than what we think everybody else ought to do. Reality therapists approach changing "what we do" as a key to changing how we feel and how we will work to obtain what we want. These ideas are similar to those in other therapy movements such as Re-evaluation Counseling and person-centered psychotherapy, although the former emphasizes emotional release as a method of clearing emotional hurt.

=== Control ===
Control is a key issue in reality therapy. Human beings need control to meet their needs: one person seeks control through position and money, and another wants to control their physical space. Control gets a client into trouble in two primary ways: when he or she tries to control other people, and when he or she uses drugs and alcohol to give him or her a false sense of control. At the very heart of choice theory is the core belief that the only person the client can really control is him or herself. If the client thinks he or she can control others, then he or she is moving in the direction of frustration. If the client thinks others can control him or her and follows up by blaming them for all that goes on in their life, then he or she tends to do nothing and heads for frustration. There may be events that happen to the client which is out of their control, but ultimately, it is up to the client to choose how to respond to these events. Trying to control other people is a vain naive hope, from the point of view of reality therapy. It is a never-ending battle which alienates the client from others and causes endless pain and frustration. This is why it is vital for the client to stick to what is in their own control and to respect the rights of other people to meet their needs. The client can, of course, get an instant sense of control from alcohol and some other drugs. This method of control, however, is false, and skews the true level of control the client has over him or herself. This creates an inconsistent level of control which creates even more dissonance and frustration.

=== Focus on the present ===
While traditional psychoanalysis and counseling often focuses on past events, reality therapy and choice theory solutions lie in the client's present and future. Practitioners of reality therapy may visit the past but never dwell on it. In reality therapy, the past is seen as the source of the client's wants and his/her ways of behaving. Supposedly each person from birth has 'taken pictures,' stored mental images which comprise ones' "Quality World." A client's 'Quality World' is examined as to what this person wants in his life and is it realistic. Each person strives to attain things which have given them pleasure in the past. Everyone's 'quality world' is different, so naturally when people enter into a relationship their 'quality world' most likely will not match up with that of their new partner.

== Process ==
=== Involvement ===
Establishing a relationship with the client is believed to be the most important factor in all types of therapy. Without this relationship, the other steps will not be effective. This is also known as developing a good rapport with the client. In extreme cases, the therapist may be the only person in the client's life who is willing to put up with the client's behavior long enough to establish a relationship, which can require a great deal of patience from the therapist. In other cases, the client is a part of many relationships, but just needs a relationship with a more consistently positive emphasis. According to Glasser, the client needs to feel that the therapist is someone that he would want in his "Quality World."

=== Evaluating current behavior ===
The therapist must emphasize the here and now with the client, focusing on the current behaviors and attitudes. The therapist asks the client to make a value judgment about their current behavior (which presumably is not beneficial, otherwise the client may not have negative consequences from behavior motivating enough to seek therapy). In many cases the therapist must press the client to examine the effects of their behavior, but it is important that the judgment be made by the client and not the therapist. According to Glasser, it is important for the client to feel that he is in control of his own life.

=== Planning possible behavior ===
Plan some behavior that is likely to work better. The client is likely to need some suggestions and prompting from the therapist, but it helps if the plan itself comes from the client. It is important that the initial steps be small enough that the client is almost certain to succeed, in order to build confidence. In many cases, the client's problem is the result of a bad relationship with someone, and since the client cannot change anyone else's behavior, the therapist will focus on things the client can do unilaterally. The client may be concerned that the other person will take advantage of this and not reciprocate, but in most cases a change in behavior will ease the tension enough that the other person also backs off. If this does not happen, the therapist will also encourage the client to build more positive relationships with other people. The relationship with the therapist sustains the client long enough for them to establish these other relationships.

=== Commitment to the plan ===
The participant must make a commitment to carry out the plan. This is important because many clients will do things for the therapist that they would not do just for themselves. In some cases it can be helpful to make the commitment in writing.

=== "No Excuses, No Punishment, Never Give Up" ===
If there is no punishment, then there is no reason to accept excuses (note that punishment can be ineffective with clients who expect to fail, see Learned helplessness). The therapist insists that the client either carries out the plan, or comes up with a more feasible plan. If the therapist maintains a good relationship with the client, it can be very hard to resist carrying out a plan that the client has agreed would be feasible. If the plan is too ambitious for the client's current abilities, then the therapist and the client work out a different plan.

== Principles ==
There are several basic principles of reality therapy that must be applied to make this technique most successful.

- Focus on the present and avoid discussing the past because all human problems are caused by unsatisfying present relationships.
- Avoid discussing symptoms and complaints as much as possible since these are often the ineffective ways that clients choose to deal with (and hold on to) unsatisfying relationships.
- Understand the concept of total behavior, which means focus on what clients can do, directly act, and think.
- Spend less time on what they cannot do directly such as changing their feelings and physiology. Feelings and physiology can be changed indirectly, but only if there is a change in the acting and thinking.
- Avoid criticizing, blaming and/or complaining and help clients do the same. By doing this, they learn to avoid these extremely harmful external control behaviors that destroy relationships.
- Help changing the 7 deadly behaviours - Criticising, Blaming, Complaining, Nagging, Threatening, Punishing, Bribing.
- Remain non-judgmental and non-coercive, but encourage people to judge all they are doing by the Choice Theory axiom: Is what I am doing getting me closer to the people I need? If the choice of behaviors is not getting people closer, then the therapist works to help the client find new behaviors that lead to a better connection.
- Teach clients that legitimate or not, excuses stand directly in the way of their ability to make needed connections.
- Focus on specifics. Find out as soon as possible who clients are disconnected from and work to help them choose reconnecting behaviors. If they are completely disconnected, focus on helping them find a new connection.
- Help them make specific, workable plans to reconnect with the people they need, and then follow through on what was planned by helping them evaluate their progress. Based on their experience, therapists may suggest plans, but should not give the message that there is only one plan. A plan is always open to revision or rejection by the client.
- Be patient and supportive but keep focusing on the source of the problem: disconnectedness. Clients who have been disconnected for a long time will find it difficult to reconnect. They are often so involved in the harmful behavior that they have lost sight of the fact that they need to reconnect. Help them to understand Choice Theory and explain that whatever their complaint, reconnecting is the best possible solution to their problem.

== Applications ==
In education, reality therapy can be used as a basis for the school's classroom management plan. Reality therapy has been shown to be effective in improving underachieving junior high school students' internal perception of control. Their internal perception of control refers to their locus of control being internal or external. Reality therapy can be used to help school psychologists improve students with emotional and behavioral disturbances. Cynthia Palmer Mason and Jill Duba, professors at Western Kentucky University, have proposed reality therapy techniques be applied to school counseling programs. They propose using reality therapy methods will help school counselors develop positive therapeutic relationships and improve students' self esteem.

Reality therapy has also been found effective with improving the self concept of elementary school students. Many at risk and alternative schools across the nation have implemented reality therapy techniques and methods to improve school functioning and the learning and social environment. Other areas of application have been used in athletic coaching, childhood obesity, and post-traumatic stress disorder (PTSD). Ken Klug has looked at different coaching techniques and has found that many successful coaches use some aspects of reality therapy. According to Klug, reality therapy in coaching helps build relationships, a healthy teaching environment and brings a definitive purpose to goal setting. Reality therapy can also be used to prevent or control childhood obesity. It is suggested that applied reality therapy methods may help children evaluate their eating behaviors, set realistic goals and integrate effective self-evaluation. Sheryl Prenzlau, a social worker in Israel, has found empirical evidence to suggest that reality therapy can reduce somatization and rumination behaviors associated with PTSD.

== Criticisms ==
The main limitation regarding reality therapy is that it primarily and exclusively deals with the current and the present problems of the individuals. Not looking to unlock trauma or recurring dreams, reality therapy's only workable arena is the present and going forward in the best possible way, while remembering the importance of taking responsibility for one's own actions and realizing that the only person one can control is oneself. In that realization of personal responsibility, one is given great freedom and happiness. Some people find fault with Glasser's notion that people chose the behaviors that afflict them by choosing chronic depressive thought patterns and choosing profound psychosis. Apart from specific brain pathology, Glasser argues that mental illness is a result of unsatisfying present relationships or general unhappiness.

An opposing view to this is, that many other schools of therapy (especially cognitive approaches) focus on the present rather than the past, and that the concept of disconnection (or failure to correctly perceive how motive and inner need/intent are linked), is in some form or other, at the root of dysfunction is also considered not unusual, according to several other accepted schools of therapy, from transpersonal psychology to transactional analysis.
