= Glasser's choice theory =

Psychological theory

The term "choice theory" is the work of William Glasser, author of the book so named, and is the culmination of some 50 years of theory and practice in psychology and counselling.

== Characteristics ==
Choice theory posits that the behaviors we choose are central to our existence. Our behavior (choices) is driven by five genetically driven needs in hierarchical order: survival, love, power, freedom, and fun.

The most basic human needs are survival (physical component) and love (mental component). Without physical (nurturing) and emotional (love), an infant will not survive to attain power, freedom, and fun.

"No matter how well-nourished and intellectually stimulated a child is, going without human touch can stunt his mental, emotional, and even physical growth".

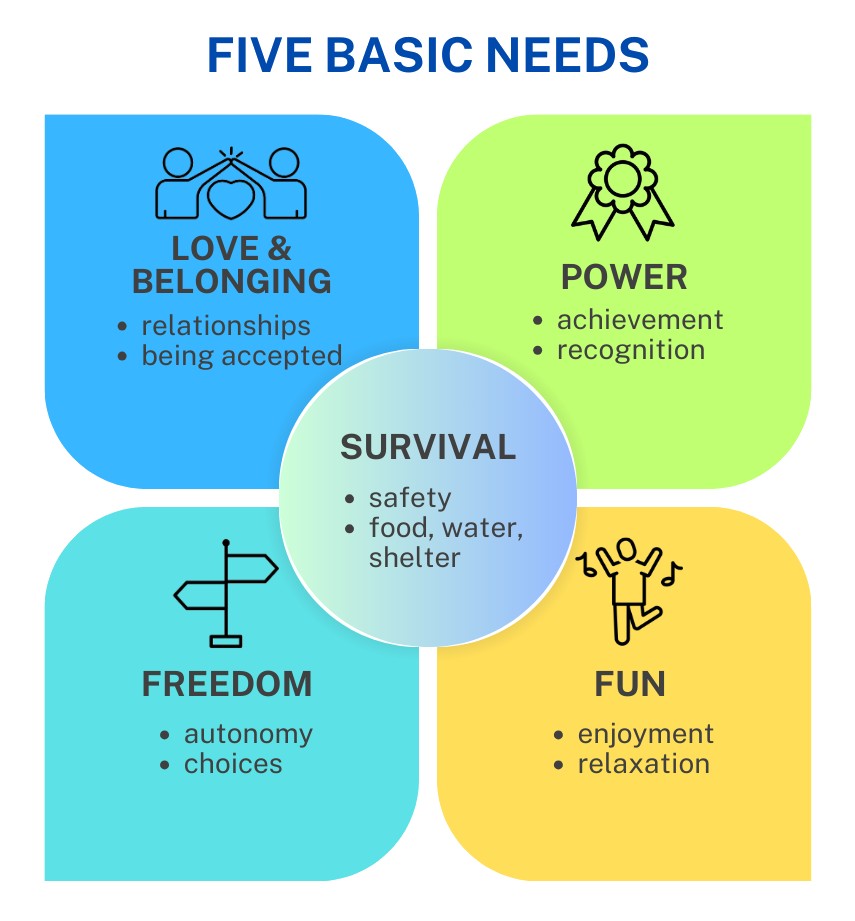
William Glasser's choice theory and reality therapy: 5 basic needs

Survival needs include:

- Food
- Clothing
- Shelter
- Breathing
- personal safety
- security and sex, having children

And four fundamental psychological needs:

- Belonging/connecting/love
- Power/significance/competence
- Freedom/autonomy
- Fun/learning

Choice theory suggests the existence of a "quality world." The idea of a "quality world" in choice theory has been compared to Jungian archetypes, but Glasser's acknowledgement of this connection is unclear. Some argue that Glasser's "quality world" and what Jung would call healthy archetypes share similarities.

Our "quality world" images are our role models of an individual's "perfect" world of parents, relations, possessions, beliefs, etc. How each person's "quality world" is somewhat unusual, even in the same family of origin, is taken for granted.

Starting from birth and continuing throughout our lives, each person places significant role models, significant possessions, and significant systems of belief (religion, cultural values, icons, etc.) into a mostly unconscious framework Glasser called our "quality world". The issue of negative role models and stereotypes is not extensively discussed in choice theory.

Glasser also posits a "comparing place," where we compare and contrast our perceptions of people, places, and things immediately in front of us against ideal images (archetypes) of these in our quality world framework. Our subconscious pushes us towards calibrating—as best we can—our real-world experience with our quality world (archetypes).

Behavior ("total behavior" in Glasser's terms) is made up of these four components: acting, thinking, feeling, and physiology. Glasser suggests we have considerable control or choice over the first two of these, yet little ability to directly choose the latter two as they are more deeply sub- and unconscious. These four components remain closely intertwined, and the choices we make in our thinking and acting will greatly affect our feelings and physiology.

Glasser frequently emphasizes that failed or strained relationships with significant individuals such as spouses, parents, children, friends, and colleagues can contribute to personal unhappiness.

The symptoms of unhappiness are widely variable and are often seen as mental illnesses. Glasser believed that "pleasure" and "happiness" are related but far from synonymous. Sex, for example, is a "pleasure" but may well be divorced from a "satisfactory relationship," which is a precondition for lasting "happiness" in life. Hence the intense focus on the improvement of relationships in counseling with choice theory—the "new reality therapy". Individuals who are familiar with both reality therapy and choice theory may have a preference for the latter, which is considered a more modern approach.

According to choice theory, mental illness can be linked to personal unhappiness. Glasser champions how we are able to learn and choose alternate behaviors that result in greater personal satisfaction. Reality therapy is a choice theory-based counseling process focused on helping clients learn to make those self-optimizing choices.

== The Ten Axioms of Choice ==
1. The only person whose behavior we can control is ourselves.
2. All we can give another person is information.
3. All long-lasting psychological problems are relationship problems.
4. The problem relationship is always part of our present life.
5. What happened in the past has everything to do with who we are today, but we can only satisfy our basic needs right now and plan to continue satisfying them in the future.
6. We can only satisfy our needs by satisfying the pictures in our quality world.
7. All we do is behave.
8. All behavior is total behavior and is made up of four components: acting, thinking, feeling, and physiology.
9. All of our total behavior is chosen, but we only have direct control over the acting and thinking components. We can only control our feelings and physiology indirectly through how we choose to act and think.
10. All total behavior is designated by verbs and named by the part that is the most recognizable.

== In Classroom Management ==
William Glasser's choice theory begins: Behavior is not separate from choice; we all choose how to behave at any time. Second, we cannot control anyone's behavior but our own. Glasser emphasized the importance of classroom meetings as a means to improve communication and solve classroom problems. Glasser suggested that teachers should assist students in envisioning a fulfilling school experience and planning the choices that would enable them to achieve it.

For example, Johnny Waits is an 18-year-old high school senior and plans on attending college to become a computer programmer. Glasser suggests that Johnny could be learning as much as he can about computers instead of reading Plato. Glasser proposed a curriculum approach that emphasizes practical, real-world topics chosen by students based on their interests and inclinations. This approach is referred to as the quality curriculum. The quality curriculum places particular emphasis on topics that have practical career applications. According to Glasser's approach, teachers facilitate discussions with students to identify topics they are interested in exploring further when introducing new material. In line with Glasser's approach, students are expected to articulate the practical value of the material they choose to explore.

== Education ==
Glasser did not endorse Summerhill, and the quality schools he oversaw typically had conventional curriculum topics. The main innovation of these schools was a deeper, more humanistic approach to the group process between teachers, students, and learning.

== Critiques ==
In a book review, Christopher White writes that Glasser believes everything in the DSM-IV-TR is a result of an individual's brain creatively expressing its unhappiness. White also notes that Glasser criticizes the psychiatric profession and questions the effectiveness of medications in treating mental illness. White points out that the book does not provide a set of randomized clinical trials demonstrating the success of Glasser's teachings.

== See also ==
- Cognitive psychology
- Introspection illusion
- Léopold Szondi
