= Boris Sidis =

American psychologist (1867–1923)

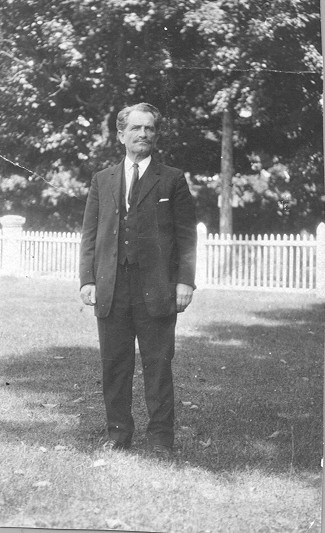
- Born: October 12, 1867; Berdychiv, Russian Empire, now Ukraine
- Died: October 24, 1923 (aged 56); Portsmouth, New Hampshire, U.S.
- Education: Harvard University (BA, MA, PhD, MD)
- Spouse: Sarah Mandelbaum
- Children: 2, including William

Boris Sidis (/ˈsaɪdɪs/; October 12, 1867 – October 24, 1923) was an American psychopathologist, psychologist, physician, psychiatrist, and philosopher of education. Sidis founded the New York State Psychopathic Institute and the Journal of Abnormal Psychology. He was the father of child prodigy William James Sidis. Boris Sidis eventually opposed mainstream psychology and Sigmund Freud, and thereby died ostracized. He was married to a maternal aunt of Clifton Fadiman, the American intellectual.

Born in the Russian Empire, Sidis emigrated to the U.S. to escape political persecution. According to Amy Wallace, he was imprisoned for two years. Sidis fled the pogroms with his wife and children. He proceeded to complete four degrees at Harvard University and sought to provide insight into why people behave as they do. Sidis died in 1923, age 56.

== Early life ==
Boris Sidis was born on October 12, 1867, in Berdichev, to Jewish parents. Boris emigrated to the U.S. in 1887 to escape political persecution. Due to the May Laws, he was imprisoned for at least two years, according to William James Sidis' biographer, Amy Wallace. He later credited his ability to think to this long solitary confinement. His wife, Sarah Mandelbaum Sidis, M.D., and her family fled the pogroms about 1889.

== Career and views ==
Boris completed four degrees at Harvard (a B.A., M.A., Ph.D. and M.D.) and studied under William James. He was influential in the early 20th century, known for pioneering work in psychopathology (founding the New York State Psychopathic Institute and the Journal of Abnormal Psychology), hypnoid/hypnotic states, and group psychology. He is also noted for vigorously applying the principles of Darwinian evolution to the study of psychology.

He vehemently opposed World War I, viewing war as a social disease, and denigrated the widely held concept of eugenics. He sought to provide insight into why people behave as they do, particularly in cases of a mob frenzy or religious mania. With the publication of his book Nervous Ills: Their Cause and Cure in 1922, he summarized much of his previous work in diagnosing, understanding and treating nervous disorders. He saw fear as an underlying cause of much human mental suffering and problematic behavior.

== Personal life ==
Sidis married Sarah Mandelbaum by whom he had two children. William born on April 1, 1898, and Bessie born on February 12, 1908.

Sidis applied his own psychological approaches to raising William in whom he wished to promote a high intellectual capacity. After receiving much publicity for his childhood feats, he came to live an eccentric life and died in relative obscurity. Sidis himself derided intelligence testing as "silly, pedantic, absurd, and grossly misleading."

Sidis died on October 24, 1923, at the age of 56.

== Partial bibliography ==
- The Psychology of Suggestion: A Research into the Subconscious Nature of Man and Society (1898)
- Psychopathological Researches: Studies in Mental Dissociation (1902)
- Multiple Personality: An Experimental Investigation into Human Individuality (1904)
- An Experimental Study of Sleep (1909)
- Philistine and Genius (1911)
- The Psychology of Laughter (1913)
- The Foundations of Normal and Abnormal Psychology (1914)
- Symptomatology, Psychognosis, and Diagnosis of Psychopathic Diseases (1914)
- The Causation and Treatment of Psychopathic Diseases (1916)
- The Source and Aim of Human Progress: A Study in Social Psychology and Social Pathology (1919)
- Nervous Ills: Their Cause and Cure (1922)

== See also ==
- Ira Van Gieson (1866–1913), a collaborator

== Notes ==
- Sidis' birthplace is commonly listed as Kiev. However, a biographical note from his daughter sidis.net says he was born in "Berditchev," a small town about 150 km SW of Kiev.
- His writings are available at sidis.net
