= History of psychology (discipline) =

Academic discipline

History of psychology is the academic discipline concerned with studying the history of the study of psychology. Another term would be historiography of psychology. Postsecondary course titles and textbooks often combine history and systems of psychology; one chapter may address the history and tenets of structuralism, a subsequent chapter functionalism, a subsequent chapter behaviorism, etc.

The discipline is related to the history of human science, the history of emotions, and the history of psychiatry. These must be considered separately, however, as they have their own disciplinary norms.

== The new history of psychology ==
It is now common practice, when teaching advanced courses in the history of psychology, to follow Laurel Furumoto in making a distinction between old and new history. This label was intended to recognize a shift in disciplinary norms that first became apparent, in retrospect, in the 1970s. Before that, the history of psychology was harshly criticized by specialist historians of science for being celebratory and Whiggish.

In other words, the contemporary history of psychology is broadly describable as post-Kuhnian. As a result, it shares traits with contemporary historiography of science, science and technology studies, and the sociology of scientific knowledge. Kurt Danziger's book, Constructing the Subject: Historical Origins of Psychological Research, is often considered exemplary of this approach.

=== Feminist voices ===
The realization that previous histories had been celebratory led to a search for subjects who had been dismissed for reasons unrelated to their own merit. This effort continues to rediscover extremely significant contributions by women to the formation of psychology, which had become invisible as a result of the way in which the old histories had been written. In this, the influence of E. G. Boring's old history continues to be felt today.

=== Internationalization and indigenization ===
The critique that psychology is itself biased as a science by its focus on WEIRD subjects coincided with a move toward the internationalization of the history of psychology. This now has two main lines—the way in which psychology has developed as a discipline in different geographical locations and the way in which psychological expertise has changed as it has moved between national contexts. This is often referred to simply as indigenization.

== Graduate programs ==
When a university employs a specialist Historian of Psychology to do original research and teach the history course required for accreditation, there is usually only one on staff. However, there are three large research groups in the world that work in English and also offer a PhD:

- York University, Canada
- University of Groningen, Netherlands
- Simon Fraser University, Canada

There are many lower-level programs.

== Scholarly journals ==
There are three primary journals where specialist histories of psychology are published:

- History of Psychology
- History of the Human Sciences
- Journal of the History of the Behavioral Sciences

In addition, there are a large number of friendly journals where specialist material can often be found. The most prominent of these include:

- American Psychologist
- American Journal of Psychology
- Isis (journal)
- History of Psychiatry (journal)
- Science in Context (journal)
- British Journal for the History of Science

== Archives ==
Important interpretive work has been done by examining secondary sources. But true historical discoveries are typically made in specialist archives, where unpublished—and sometimes unknown—primary sources can be examined.

- Archives of the History of American Psychology

== Prominent historians of psychology ==
- David Baker
- Ludy Benjamin, Jr
- Kurt Danziger
- Donald Dewsbury
- Raymond E. Fancher
- Christopher D. Green
- David E. Leary
- Wade E. Pickren
- Alexandra Rutherford
- Stephanie A. Shields
- Henderikus J. Stam
- Thomas Teo
- Andrew Winston
