= Chris Green =

Chris Green may refer to:

== Sports ==
- Chris Green (American football) (born 1968), NFL defensive back
- Chris Green (baseball) (born 1960), former Major League Baseball pitcher
- Chris Green (cricketer) (born 1993), Australian cricketer
- Chris Green (horseman) (1820–1874), British steeplechase rider and trainer
- Chris Green (rugby league) (born 1989), English rugby league player
- Rhino Boy Chris, moniker of Chris Green (born c. 1978), UK-based charity marathon runner

== Other ==
- Chris Green (politician) (born 1973), Conservative MP, British politician
- Chris Green (railway manager) (born 1943), British railwayman
- Chris Green (White Ribbon Campaign), executive director of the White Ribbon Campaign
- Chris D. Green (born 1959), Canadian psychologist and historian of psychology

== See also ==
- Christopher Green (disambiguation)
- Chris Greene (disambiguation)
