= Christopher Green =

Christopher Green may refer to:

- Christopher Green (art historian) (born 1943), art history professor
- Christopher Green (author), Australian speculative fiction author
- Christopher Green (legal scholar), professor of Constitutional Law
- Christopher Green (paediatrician) (born 1948), Australian author of best-selling books on raising toddlers
- Christopher Green (physician) (1652–1741), Regius Professor of Physic at Cambridge
- Christopher Green (Sacramento mayor) from 1872 to 1877
- Christopher Green (writer-performer) (born c. 1968), British comedian and writer
- Christopher D. Green (born 1959), professor of psychology and philosophy at York University in Toronto, Canada

== See also ==
- Chris Green (disambiguation)
- Chris Greene (disambiguation)
