= Raymond Fancher =

American psychologist and historian (born 1940)

- Born: 1940 (age 85–86); Waterbury, Connecticut, U.S.
- Education: Wesleyan University; Harvard University
- Spouse: Susan Lynn Cogburn (m. 1964)
- Scientific career
- Fields: History of psychology
- Workplaces: York University
- Thesis: Accuracy and validity in person perception as functions of differing approaches to personality (1967)
- Notable students: Christopher D. Green

Raymond Elwood Fancher (born 1940) is an American psychologist and historian. He is a Senior Scholar and Professor Emeritus at York University in Toronto, where he also helped to found the History and Theory of Psychology Ph.D. program. He is the author of nearly 100 publications on the history of psychology, and served as editor-in-chief of the Journal of the History of the Behavioral Sciences from 2001 to 2005. In 2006, he received the Lifetime Achievement Award (now the Career Achievement Award) from the Society for the History of Psychology.
