= Review of General Psychology =

- Discipline: Psychology
- Language: English
- Edited by: Wade E. Pickren, Thomas Teo

Publication details
- Publisher: SAGE (United States)
- Frequency: Quarterly
- Impact factor: 2.786 (2018)

Standard abbreviations
- ISO 4: Rev. Gen. Psychol.

Indexing
- ISSN: 1089-2680 (print); 1939-1552 (web)

Links
- Journal homepage

Review of General Psychology is the quarterly scientific journal of the American Psychological Association Division 1: The Society for general psychology. The journal publishes cross-disciplinary psychological articles that are conceptual, theoretical, and methodological in nature. Other aspects include the evaluation and integration of research literature and the providing of historical analysis. The journal was established in 1997. The editor-in-chief is Wade E. Pickren (Independent Scholar, USA) and Thomas Teo (York University, Canada).

== History ==
The journal was formerly published by the APA.https://www.apa.org/pubs/journals/gpr

== Abstracting and indexing ==
According to the Journal Citation Reports, the journal has a 2018 impact factor of 2.786.

== See also ==
- List of psychology journals
