= Ayesha Sherzai and Dean Sherzai =

American neurologists

- Occupations: Behavioral neurologists, vascular neurologist, authors, medical educators
- Employer: Charles R. Drew University of Medicine and Science
- Known for: Alzheimer's prevention research; NEURO framework; TheBrainDocs
- Website: thebraindocs.com

Ayesha Sherzai and Dean Sherzai are American neurologists specializing in neurodegenerative diseases. They are the authors of The Alzheimer's Solution (2017) and The 30-Day Alzheimer's Solution (2021), both published by HarperOne.

Ayesha Sherzai currently serves as Clinical Associate Professor and Director of the INSPIRE program at Charles R. Drew University of Medicine and Science, and Dean Sherzai serves as Executive Director of Clinical Research, Director of Community Core, and Professor of Neurology and Neuroscience in the same department. They previously co-directed the Brain Health and Alzheimer's Prevention Program at Loma Linda University and then the Brain Health and Alzheimer's Prevention Program at Cedars-Sinai Medical Center. Their clinical work centers on what they describe as the NEURO framework (Nutrition, Exercise, Unwind, Restorative Sleep, and Optimize), a lifestyle-based protocol for reducing Alzheimer's risk.

They appeared as expert commentators in the 2024 Netflix documentary series You Are What You Eat: A Twin Experiment (2024).

== Early lives and education ==
Ayesha Sherzai completed a dual residency in preventive medicine and neurology at Loma Linda University, and a vascular neurology fellowship at Columbia University/NewYork-Presbyterian Hospital. She received the American Heart Association's Trudy Bush Fellowship Award in 2015 for her research on cardiovascular disease in women.

Dean Sherzai earned his medical degree from Eastern Virginia Medical School, completed a neurology residency at Georgetown University, and undertook a fellowship in experimental therapeutics at the National Institute of Neurological Disorders and Stroke (NINDS), part of the National Institutes of Health. He subsequently completed a behavioral neurology and dementia fellowship at the University of California, San Diego. He also holds a PhD in Healthcare Leadership from Andrews University and a Master of Public Health in Epidemiology from Loma Linda University.

== Career ==
=== Academic and institutional positions ===
Ayesha and Dean Sherzai held faculty positions at Cedars-Sinai Medical Center before joining Loma Linda University, where they co-directed the Brain Health and Alzheimer's Prevention Program. They subsequently moved to Charles R. Drew University of Medicine and Science, where Ayesha Sherzai serves as Clinical Associate Professor and Dean Sherzai as Executive Director of Clinical Research.

=== Research ===
Their research focuses on modifiable risk factors for Alzheimer's disease, particularly lifestyle intervention approaches including diet, exercise, cognitive engagement, stress management, and sleep optimization.

=== Books ===
The Alzheimer's Solution: A Breakthrough Program to Prevent and Reverse the Symptoms of Cognitive Decline at Every Age was published by HarperOne in September 2017. The book presents a lifestyle-based approach to Alzheimer's prevention organized around five domains: nutrition, exercise, cognitive engagement, stress management, and sleep.

The 30-Day Alzheimer's Solution: The Definitive Food and Lifestyle Guide to Preventing Cognitive Decline was published by HarperOne in March 2021. It reached the Wall Street Journal and USA Today bestseller lists.

=== Public health and policy work ===
From 2003 to 2005, Dean Sherzai served as Afghanistan's Deputy Minister of Health, appointed by President Hamid Karzai. In this role, he helped oversee the implementation of a Basic Package of Health Services (BPHS), a public health delivery model designed for post-conflict reconstruction. The Lancet described the Afghan BPHS as a potential model for healthcare rebuilding in fragile states.

During this period, Sherzai developed a women's empowerment model embedded within the healthcare system, which was subsequently published in Health Care for Women International and the Harvard Review.

== Media appearances ==
The Times (London) published a feature profile on the Sherzais and their approach to Alzheimer's prevention through lifestyle intervention.

Both Sherzais appeared as expert commentators in You Are What You Eat: A Twin Experiment, a four-episode Netflix documentary series released in January 2024 that followed identical twins eating different diets as part of a Stanford University study. The series won the Daytime Emmy Award for Outstanding Lifestyle Program in October 2025. Within the series, the Sherzais administered cognitive assessments to measure neurological effects of dietary changes.

They have been featured as guest experts on a range of health and science podcasts and media, including The Rich Roll Podcast (three appearances), The Mel Robbins Podcast, the ZOE Science & Nutrition Podcast, and the BBC Good Food Podcast, where they were the featured guests in an episode on brain health. Dean Sherzai has been quoted as a neurology expert in CNN health reporting. Both have produced video content for AARP.

Ayesha and Dean have spoken at the Aspen Ideas Festival.

== Public engagement ==
The Sherzais maintain a public health education platform under the name The Brain Docs, which includes social media channels and a podcast. Their work under this name is aimed at translating neuroscience research for general audiences.

== Selected works ==
=== Books ===
- The Alzheimer's Solution: A Breakthrough Program to Prevent and Reverse the Symptoms of Cognitive Decline at Every Age. HarperOne. 2017. ISBN 978-0-06-266647-5.
- The 30-Day Alzheimer's Solution: The Definitive Food and Lifestyle Guide to Preventing Cognitive Decline. HarperOne. 2021. ISBN 978-0-06-299695-4.

=== Articles ===
- Fleisher, Adam S.; Sherzai, Ayesha; Taylor, Curtis; Langbaum, Jessica B. S.; Chen, Kewei; Buxton, Richard B. (2009-10-01). "Resting-state BOLD networks versus task-associated functional MRI for distinguishing Alzheimer's disease risk groups". NeuroImage. 47 (4): 1678–1690. doi:10.1016/j.neuroimage.2009.06.021. ISSN 1053-8119. PMC 2722694. PMID 19539034.
- Fleisher, Adam S.; Podraza, Katherine M.; Bangen, Katherine J.; Taylor, Curtis; Sherzai, Ayesha; Sidhar, Kunal; Liu, Thomas T.; Dale, Anders M.; Buxton, Richard B. (2009-11-01). "Cerebral perfusion and oxygenation differences in Alzheimer's disease risk". Neurobiology of Aging. 30 (11): 1737–1748. doi:10.1016/j.neurobiolaging.2008.01.012. ISSN 0197-4580. PMC 2746874. PMID 18325636.
- Sherzai, Ayesha; Heim, Lauren T; Boothby, Cassaundra; Sherzai, A Dean (August 2012). "Stroke, food groups, and dietary patterns: a systematic review". Nutrition Reviews. 70 (8): 423–435. doi:10.1111/j.1753-4887.2012.00490.x. PMID 22835136.
- Sherzai, Ayesha Z.; Elkind, Mitchell S.V. (March 2015). "Advances in stroke prevention". Annals of the New York Academy of Sciences. 1338 (1): 1–15. Bibcode:2015NYASA1338....1S. doi:10.1111/nyas.12723. ISSN 0077-8923. PMC 7008637. PMID 25779474.
- Sherman, Dale S.; Mauser, Justin; Nuno, Miriam; Sherzai, Dean (2017-12-01). "The Efficacy of Cognitive Intervention in Mild Cognitive Impairment (MCI): a Meta-Analysis of Outcomes on Neuropsychological Measures". Neuropsychology Review. 27 (4): 440–484. doi:10.1007/s11065-017-9363-3. ISSN 1573-6660. PMC 5754430. PMID 29282641.
- Yi, Minju; Sherzai, Ayesha Z.; Ani, Chizobam; Shavlik, David; Ghamsary, Mark; Lazar, Evelyn; Sherzai, Dean (January 2019). "Strong Association Between Migraine and Transient Global Amnesia: A National Inpatient Sample Analysis". The Journal of Neuropsychiatry and Clinical Neurosciences. 31 (1): 43–48. doi:10.1176/appi.neuropsych.17120353. PMID 30305003.
- Dumitrascu, Oana M.; Lyden, Patrick D.; Torbati, Tania; Sheyn, Julia; Sherzai, Ayesha; Sherzai, Dean; Sherman, Dale S.; Rosenberry, Ryan; Cheng, Susan; Johnson, Kenneth O.; Czeszynski, Alan D.; Verdooner, Steven; Frautschy, Sally; Black, Keith L.; Koronyo, Yosef (January 2020). "Sectoral segmentation of retinal amyloid imaging in subjects with cognitive decline". Alzheimer's & Dementia: Diagnosis, Assessment & Disease Monitoring. 12 (1) e12109. doi:10.1002/dad2.12109. ISSN 2352-8729. PMC 7521595. PMID 33015311.
- Lazar, Evelyn; Sherzai, Ayesha; Adeghate, Jennifer; Sherzai, Dean (2021-06-30). "Gut dysbiosis, insulin resistance and Alzheimer's disease: review of a novel approach to neurodegeneration". Frontiers in Bioscience-Scholar. 13 (1): 17–29. doi:10.52586/S550. ISSN 1945-0524. PMID 34256527.
