= Nardelli =

Nardelli is an Italian surname, which means a descendant of "Nardo", a pet form of the name Leonardo ("lion-like"). The name may refer to:

- Elania Nardelli (born 1987), Italian sport shooter
- Francesco Nardelli (born 1953), Italian naturalist
- Maria Nardelli (born 1954), Italian athlete
- Michael Nardelli (born 1983), American actor
- Robert Nardelli (born 1948), American businessman
- Stefano Nardelli (born 1993), Italian cyclist
- Steve Nardelli (born 1948), British musician
