= Donald Dewsbury =

American psychologist (1939–2025)

- Born: Donald Allen Dewsbury; August 11, 1939
- Died: March 26, 2025 (aged 85)
- Education: Bucknell University; University of Michigan
- Awards: Presidential Citation from the American Psychological Association (2017)
- Scientific career
- Fields: Comparative psychology History of psychology
- Workplaces: University of Florida
- Thesis: Some correlates of electric organ discharge frequency in three species of electric fishes (1965)
- Academic advisors: Frank Beach
- Notable students: Antonio Puente

Donald Allen Dewsbury (August 11, 1939 – March 26, 2025) was an American comparative psychologist and historian of psychology. He was Professor of Psychology at the University of Florida. Much of his research focused on the history of psychology, particularly comparative and experimental psychology. He also conducted research on animal behavior, and served as president of the Animal Behavior Society, as well as of three divisions of the American Psychological Association. In 2017, he received a Presidential Citation from the American Psychological Association. Dewsbury died on March 26, 2025, at the age of 85.
