= History of Psychology (journal) =

- Discipline: History of psychology
- Language: English
- Edited by: Christopher D. Green

Publication details
- History: 1998-present
- Publisher: American Psychological Association (United States)
- Frequency: Quarterly
- Impact factor: 0.8 (2024)

Standard abbreviations
- ISO 4: Hist. Psychol.

Indexing
- ISSN: 1093-4510 (print); 1939-0610 (web)

Links
- Journal homepage; Online access

History of Psychology is a peer-reviewed academic journal and a publication of Division 26 of the American Psychological Association: Society for the History of Psychology. The journal was established in 1998 and covers research on the history of psychology. The current Editor is Christopher D. Green (York University).

== Abstracting and indexing ==
The journal is abstracted and indexed in MEDLINE/PubMed and the Social Sciences Citation Index. According to the Journal Citation Reports, the journal has a 2024 impact factor of 0.8.

== Notable articles ==
The three most-cited articles published in the journal are:

1. Nicolas, Serge; Murray, David J. (1999). "Théodule Ribot (1839–1916), founder of French psychology: A biographical introduction". History of Psychology. 2 (4): 277. doi:10.1037/1093-4510.2.4.277.
2. Nicholson, Ian A. M. (1998). "Gordon Allport, character, and the "culture of personality," 1897–1937". History of Psychology. 1 (1): 52–68. doi:10.1037/1093-4510.1.1.52. PMID 11620320.
3. Hsueh, Yeh (2002). "The Hawthorne experiments and the introduction of Jean Piaget in American industrial psychology, 1929-1932". History of Psychology. 5 (2): 163–89. doi:10.1037/1093-4510.5.2.163. PMID 12096759.
