= Edwin Ray Guthrie =

American psychologist (1886–1959)

- Born: 9 January 1886; Lincoln, Nebraska, U.S.
- Died: 23 April 1959 (aged 73); Seattle, Washington, U.S.
- Education: University of Nebraska (BA, MA); University of Pennsylvania (PhD, 1912)
- Known for: One trial theory
- Scientific career
- Fields: Behaviorism, mathematics, philosophy
- Doctoral advisor: Edgar A. Singer Jr.

Edwin Ray Guthrie (/ˈɡʌθri/; January 9, 1886 – April 23, 1959), a behavioral psychologist, began his career in mathematics and philosophy in 1917. He spent most of his career at the University of Washington, where he was a full-time professor and later became an emeritus professor in psychology.

Guthrie is best known for his works regarding stimulus–response association, which has been variously described as one-trial theory, non-reinforcement, and contiguity learning.

He theorized:

"A combination of stimuli which has accompanied a movement, while on its recurrence, tend to be followed by that movement".

Guthrie's works and theories were described as "simple" by his peers, referring to how he described complex ideas in simple terms. Critics of Guthrie have considered his teaching style defective, mistaking "incompleteness for simplicity".

== Early life and education ==
Guthrie was born in Lincoln, Nebraska, to a father who owned a store selling pianos and bicycles, and a mother who was a school teacher. He remarked that his theories got an early start when he and a friend read Darwin's Origin of Species and The Expression of the Emotions in Man and Animals while they were both in eighth grade. Guthrie graduated at the age of 17, after writing a senior thesis that argued that religion and science were trivial to the expression of Absolute Truth. Guthrie received the title of lay reader in his local Episcopal Church while pursuing a philosophy degree from the University of Nebraska. He credited the university with helping him pursue his varied interests because "the university had none of the present requirements of required courses and set curricula...This freedom made possible the inclusion of courses in both Latin and Greek which had been begun in high school; mathematics through calculus."

=== Psychology interest ===
While Guthrie was going to graduate school, he was the only student in a seminary taught by Wilhelm Wundt's protégé Harry Kirke Wolfe, where they debated the philosophy of science. Guthrie later characterized the classes that he took for his degree as philosophy courses that "took much interest in issues that would now be recognized as psychological". His focus upon a theoretical approach to psychology as opposed to an experimental research approach can be found in his account of his single experimental psychology course which he described as "a research course under Bolton devoted a winter to observations with an aesthesiometer on the limen of twoness, and served to quench [my] interest in psychophysics, which was the chief preoccupation of psychological laboratories then".

His professional psychology career did not start in full until he met Stevenson Smith, who founded the psychology department at the University of Washington in 1917. Guthrie and Smith helped write Chapters in General Psychology in 1921. This book and work with Smith, focused on Guthrie's continuing psychological works towards how exactly learning works and what affects a person's capability of learning. He and his wife, Helen MacDonald, traveled to France where they met Pierre Janet. Janet's writing influenced Guthrie's thinking, so much that Guthrie and his wife translated Janet's Principles of Psychology together. Guthrie added to Janet's writings an objective theory of learning.

== One trial theory ==
Guthrie's theories went against those of Thorndike's classical conditioning and Skinner's operant conditioning due mainly to Guthrie's insistence that their "desire for results of immediate practical applications" led to their theories being wrong. Guthrie's learning theory is called one-trial learning and he developed it with Smith at the University of Washington. Guthrie and Smith's theory states that all learning is done within a single exposure to a situation. Guthrie admitted that his own theory required the assumption that people react to a given situation the same way so long as it is still effective. Guthrie's more ambiguous theories and assumptions were put into more understandable terms after his death. These notes focused upon the following three principles:

- The principle of the association says that any stimulus that accompanies a behavior or immediately precedes it by less than half a second becomes a cue for that specific behavior.
- The principle of postremity theorizes that a stimulus when followed by more than two responses only becomes associated with the response closest to the stimulus.
- The principle of response probability states that the chance of a particular response occurring at a specified time relates to the size of the stimulus for that response present at the specified time. The more cues for a stimulus, the higher the chance of a desired response.

=== Punishment ===
Guthrie also had theories as to how punishment worked that were at odds with the likes of Thorndike and other learning theorists of his own time. Guthrie thought that punishment was only as effective as the amount of change in behavior the punishment caused. Guthrie's theory required that the presentation of punishment happen while the stimulus is still around. He did warn that if the punishment did not stop the undesirable response or if it was not presented in the presence of the stimulus the punishment could actually strengthen the undesired response.

=== Breaking habits ===
Guthrie believed that dozens of tiny movements make up what most see as a single behavior; much like waving goodbye actually involves dozens of muscle movements. Guthrie viewed habits as a response connecting with a large number of stimuli, which causes the habit to happen more often to a wide variety of things. He postulated that there were three different ways to break a habit, the threshold method, the fatigue method, and the incompatible response method.

- The threshold method involves introducing stimuli that are associated with the habit response at such a weak level that it does not actually elicit the response. The strength of the stimuli is increased slowly until the stimuli can be presented at full strength without eliciting the habit response. Guthrie compared this method to "horse whispering."
- The fatigue method is quite simple, you keep presenting the stimulus until the person with the habit no longer replies with their habitual response. Guthrie considered this method similar to "breaking the horse."
- The incompatible response method pairs the stimuli that cause the habitual behavior with another stimulus that triggers a response that is opposite or incompatible with the habit that you want to get rid of.

== Historical relevance ==
According to his students, Guthrie's writings and theories were intentionally vague and "ambiguous" much to his insistence on his work not being biased in a similar fashion and due to this resulted in most of his theories not being tested while Guthrie was alive. His peers and students turned his theories into more precise ideas that allowed experiments to test them. His theories on learning were wrong, but his ideas about behaviorism helped make the case that psychology as a whole had important applications to real-life issues. His real effect on the course of psychology, however, came from his students. Voeks, a student, was the one who formalized Guthrie's theories into a more testable form and his colleague William Kaye Estes took Guthrie's ideas and created a statistical theory of learning that he is now famous for.

== Guthrie on education ==
Edwin Ray Guthrie was interested in the application of psychology and his learning theories in education. In the preface of his book Educational Psychology (1950), he states, " … the ultimate test of a theory of learning is its influence on the all-round growth of young people when applied in the classroom." He hypothesized that pairing a stimulus and response could result in learning after only one trial. Guthrie believed that learning takes place through association and conditioning, and one pairing is often enough to establish a connection, rather than repeated stimulus-response pairings. These association and connectionist theories are the basis of Guthrie's contiguity theory of learning. The law of contiguity refers to associating, or learning, two stimuli or events that occur simultaneously. When the stimulus and response occur together, they are learned due to the connection of their contiguity.

Guthrie acknowledged the use of reinforcement and rewards, but he did not deem them necessary for learning. He believed that organisms played a large part in their learning when developing habits and skills due to "movement-produced stimuli." Therefore, he asserts that the students do not learn from what the teacher does, but from what they do themselves. In other words, students do not learn something merely by hearing or reading it; rather, the information must elicit an "active response" in the learner. He believed that the ideal school environment is one that permits "freedom of responsible action." He advocated for an environment that does not repress individual differences but rather appreciates them and allows the students as much self-direction as possible. Guthrie described that an effective teacher would be one that would modify and revise the content of their lessons because students are dynamic in their learning and are "constantly organizing and reorganizing experiences." According to Visible Learning for Teachers (2012), which evaluates effective teaching strategies, Hattie makes a significant point to advocate for flexible, adaptable instruction that is modified by the students' prior knowledge, experiences, and individual differences as well as their rates of learning.

The applications of Guthrie's theories have carried on to present education practices. In Educational Psychology (1950), he asserted that effective study skills included a clear goal, mastery of fundamentals, knowledge of learning phenomena, concentration, and practice. There is evidence that goal setting is indeed effective in learning and retaining material. Similarly, Guthrie advocated for making clear objectives for student learning by connecting the target response to the educational stimulus. Although he believed in one-trial learning, Guthrie valued practice in the classroom. The purpose of practice is to ensure that students continue to "relearn" the material because of the uniqueness of each learning experience. He asserted that distributed, or spaced, practice is the most effective and efficient method for learning and retaining content. Distributed practice has indeed been shown to be highly effective in improving student learning and is recommended for use in classrooms today.

== Bibliography ==
- Guthrie, E. R. (1938). The psychology of human conflict: the clash of motives within the individual. New York: Harper Brothers.
- Guthrie, E. R. (1946). Psychological Facts and Psychological Theory., Psychological Bulletin, 43, 1-20
- Guthrie, E. R. (1959). Association by contiguity. In Sigmund Koch (Ed.), Psychology: A study of a science (Vol. 2, pp. 158–195). New York: McGraw-Hill.

== Sources ==
- Cech, C. G. (1998). Chapter 5 - The Nature of Reinforcement & Its effects on Acquisition: Guthrie's Contiguity Theory. Retrieved October 12, 2006, from http://www.ucs.louisiana.edu/~cgc2646/LRN/Chap5.htm
- Clark, D.O. (2005). From Philosopher to Psychologist: The Early Career of Edwin Ray Guthrie, Jr. History of Psychology, 8, 235–254.
- Contiguity Theory. (2005). The Psychology of Learning. Retrieved November 23, 2009, from http://psychology.org/guthrie.html
- "Guthrie, Edwin Ray (1886-1959)". Encyclopedia of Psychology. 2001. Archived from the original on February 17, 2007 – via FindArticles.
- Hilgard E.R. & Bower G.H. Theories of learning. 2nd ed, New York: Appleton-Century-Crofts, Chapter 4: Guthrie's contiguous conditioning.
- Sheffield, D. D. (1959). Edwin Ray Guthrie: 1886–1959. American Journal of Psychology (Vol. 7, pp. 642–650).
- Smith, S., & Guthrie, E. (1920). Exhibitionism. University of Washington, 205–211.
- Theories of Learning in Educational Psychology. (2008). Edwin Guthrie and "One Trial Leaning". Retrieved November 23, 2009, from https://web.archive.org/web/20090626071206/http://www.lifecircles-inc.com/Learningtheories/behaviorism/guthrie.html.
- Thorne, M. B., & Henley, T. (2005). Connections in the History and Systems of Psychology (3rd ed). Houghton Mifflin Company.
