= Antonio Puente =

American neuropsychologist and academic (born 1952)

- Born: 1952 (age 73–74); Havana
- Known for: APA presidency, 2017
- Scientific career
- Fields: Neuropsychology
- Institutions: UNC Wilmington

Antonio E. Puente is an American neuropsychologist and academic. He was the 125th president of the American Psychological Association in 2017. He has a private practice, is the founding director of a bilingual mental health clinic, and is on the Department of Psychology faculty at the University of North Carolina Wilmington (UNCW). He founded the journal Neuropsychology Review.

== Biography ==
Antonio E. Puente, a pioneering neuropsychologist, is recognized for his passion for inclusivity, particularly in psychological assessment for Spanish-speaking populations. His work has broadened the understanding of psychology by integrating cultural and linguistic diversity into neuropsychological assessments".Dr. Puente was born during the Cuban Revolution and later immigrated to the United States with his family. His experiences of displacement and adjusting to a new culture significantly influenced his work in neuropsychology, particularly his focus on immigrant communities. He pursued his undergraduate degree at the University of Florida and later earned his Ph.D. from the University of Georgia, where he was initially met with challenges due to his English proficiency but was ultimately supported by faculty members who recognized his potential" He is married to Linda Puente and has three children: Krista Puente Trefz, clinical psychologist in Stuart, Florida; Antonio Nicolas Puente, Chief Psychologist at George Washington University School of Medicine; Lucas Llanso Puente, Senior Data Scientist at SalesForce.

== Career ==
Puente is a neuropsychologist and a psychology professor at UNCW. He founded and directs the Cape Fear Clinic, a bilingual mental health clinic in Wilmington, North Carolina, for underserved populations. He maintains a private practice in clinical neuropsychology, ranging from clinical to forensic assessments.

He founded and edited the journals Neuropsychology Review for ten years and Interprofessional Education & Practice for five years, and is the author/editor of 11 books, 95 book chapters, and 125 journal articles in Arabic, English, Italian, Spanish, and Russian. He has been president of several other psychological societies including the North Carolina Psychological Association, North Carolina Psychological Foundation, Hispanic Neuropsychological Society, National Academy of Neuropsychology, and APA three Divisions- Society for Clinical Neuropsychology, Society for Behavioral Neuroscience and Comparative Psychology, and Society for Global Psychology.

Before joining the UNCW faculty in 1981, where he teaches brain and behavior, neuropsychology, and the history of psychology, Puente was a neuroanatomy professor at St. George's University School of Medicine in Grenada. He is a visiting professor at UCLA and the University of Granada in Spain, as well as an Honorary Professor of Psychology at Moscow State University.

Throughout his career, Dr. Puente focused on the neuropsychological assessment of overlooked populations, particularly bilingual individuals. He founded the Neuropsychologists of the Spanish Language (NOSS) group in 1993 to promote culturally and linguistically appropriate treatment. His later work involved advocating for the adaptation of neuropsychological tools, such as the Test of Memory Malingering (TOMM) and the MMPI-3, to be accessible to Spanish-speaking populations. He spent 15 years as a representative to the American Medical Association's committee on Current Procedural Terminology. He served on the actual CPT Panel for eight years. His leadership extended to his tenure as APA president in 2017, where he championed equity in psychological services globally" (Puente & Hicks, 1982; Harris, Cullum, & Puente, 1993; Puente, 2017). Of the APA in 2017. Puente had four foci during his term as APA president: improving governance, membership engagement, psychology's international presence, and the APA Convention.
