= Thomas Teo =

Canadian psychologist

- Born: 1963 (age 62–63); London, England

Education
- Education: University of Vienna
- Thesis: Zur Rekonstruktion von Wissenschaftsentwicklung am Fallbeispiel der materialistischen Subjektwissenschaft (1992)

Philosophical work
- Institutions: York University
- Language: English, German
- Main interests: Theoretical Psychology; Philosophical Psychology; History of Psychology; Critical Psychology
- Notable ideas: Psychological humanities, Epistemological violence
- Website: / Thomas Teo's Home Page

Thomas Teo (born 1963) is a Canadian professor of Historical, Theoretical, and Critical Studies of Psychology at York University in Toronto, Canada. He is a leader in the fields of critical psychology and theoretical psychology.

== Academic career ==
Teo was born in London, England. He earned his Magister and PhD in psychology from the University of Vienna in Austria. From 1992 to 1995 he worked as a post-doctoral fellow and then as a research scientist at the Max Planck Institute for Human Development in Berlin, Germany. He started his professorial track at York University in Canada in 1996.

Teo was president of the International Society for Theoretical Psychology (2013–2015), president (2016–2017) of the American Psychological Association's (APA) Society for Theoretical and Philosophical Psychology (Division 24), and twice chair of the History and Philosophy of Psychology Section of the Canadian Psychological Association (CPA). He is a fellow of APA and CPA. He was editor of the Journal of Theoretical and Philosophical Psychology (2009–2014). He has served as a co-editor of the Review of General Psychology (2009–2014).

== Selected works and thought ==
Teo is a critical-theoretical psychologist who employs metatheory and history to provide a more reflexive understanding of the foundations and trajectories of current psychology while projecting alternatives to the status quo. His research has argued for psychology becoming a self-reflexive discipline that provides disciplinary and social interventions.

=== Critique of psychology ===
Teo has contributed to critical-theoretical work since his early publications on the history of German Critical Psychology, broadening the concept of critical psychology, integrating various streams of critical thought, including feminism, postcolonialism, social constructionism, political theory, indigenous psychology, and hermeneutics, that were applied to ontological, epistemological, ethical, and more recently aesthetic contexts of psychology. Significant critiques of psychology were investigated in The Critique of Psychology: From Kant to Postcolonial Theory, which was the first book to provide a systematic history of the critique of psychology. As an international leader of critical psychology he edited the Encyclopedia of Critical Psychology. In 2015 he summarized the status of critical psychology in the flagship journal of the APA the American Psychologist.

=== Critique of scientific racism and epistemological violence ===
An important critical project that Teo pursued was the study of racism and scientific racism, some of which was published in German. He worked on racism and mixed race and in a series of articles advanced the meaning of the concept of epistemological violence in empirical research. Epistemological violence is committed when interpretations of empirical data implicitly or explicitly constitute the Other as inferior or problematic, despite the fact that alternative interpretations, equally viable, based on the same results, are available.

=== Critical history ===
Teo's historical work has drawn on history, with history as a means and not as an end. Connecting the philosophy of psychology with the history of psychology, he co-authored A Critical History and Philosophy of Psychology: Diversity of Context, Thought, and Practice. Several historical studies focused on twin research, the history of critical psychology, and the history of German psychology.

=== Theoretical psychology and psychological humanities ===
Teo supports the idea of critical psychology as a generative and international movement that provides reflexivity and interference in psychosocial affairs. His latest book Outline of Theoretical Psychology: Critical Investigations discusses basic philosophical problems in the discipline and profession of psychology. By engaging with basic theoretical problems, Teo demonstrates how psychology can avoid its pitfalls and participate as a force for resistance and the good. To do so, Teo has made the argument that psychology needs to draw on the psychological humanities (including history, philosophy, political theory, science and technology studies, etc...) to understand human mental life. He has argued that the development of psychology as a science and the struggle for scientific recognition has disrupted the need to interrogate the discipline and the profession from the critical perspective of the humanities, the arts, and the concept-driven social sciences.
