= Contiguity (psychology) =

In cognitive science, association by contiguity is the principle that ideas, memories, and experiences are linked when one is frequently experienced with the other. For example, if one constantly sees a knife and a fork together, they become linked (associated). The more these two items (stimuli) are perceived together the stronger the link between them. When one of the memories becomes activated later on, the linked (contiguously associated) memory becomes temporarily more activated and thus easier to be called into working memory. This process is called priming, and the initial memory that primed the other is called the retrieval cue.

Association by contiguity is the root of association by similarity. Association by similarity is the idea that one memory primes another through their common property or properties. Thus, an apple may prime a memory of a rose through the common property of red. These two become associated even though one may have never experienced an apple and a rose together (consistent with association by contiguity).

In the study of human memory, the contiguity effect has been found in studies of free recall. Analyses of free recall data indicates that there tends to be the greatest number of +/- 1 transitions between words, suggesting that a person is more likely to recall words together that are closer together in a list. This is shown in a graph of conditional-response probability as a function of lag as originated by Dr. Michael Kahana. The probability of recall (y-axis) is plotted against the lag, or separation between subsequently recalled words. For example, if two items A and B are learned together, when cued with B, A is retrieved and vice versa due to their temporal contiguity, although there will be a stronger forward association (when cued with A, B is recalled). Changes in temporal contiguity in human subjects can be an indicator of mild cognitive impairment or an early stage of Alzheimer's disease, an observation that is assumed to be explained by the mechanism that the hippocampus and the entorhinal cortex generates sequences.

The contiguity effect appears relatively constant, and has been predicted to have long-term effects according to the temporal context model proposed by Howard and Kahana. This model explains the contiguity effect in the following manner: when an item is presented, it activates the temporal context that was active when the item was originally studied. Since contexts of neighboring items overlap, and that overlap increases with decreasing lag between items, a contiguity effect results. The contiguity effect has even been found between items in different lists, although it has been speculated that these items could simply be intrusions.

When one associated memory, a group of associated memories, or a whole line of associated memories becomes primed, this is known as spreading activation.

In conditioning, contiguity refers to how associated a reinforcer is with behaviour. The higher the contiguity between events the greater the strength of the behavioural relationship.

Edwin Ray Guthrie's contiguity theory deals with patterned movements.

== See also ==
- Metonymy
