= Save the Rhino =

UK-based conservation charity

Save the Rhino International
- Formation: April 15, 1994; 32 years ago
- Founder: Douglas Adams, Dave Stirling and Johnny Roberts
- Type: Nonprofit
- Registration no.: 1035072
- Headquarters: London, United Kingdom
- Location: London, United Kingdom
- Region served: China, India, Indonesia, Kenya, Namibia, South Africa, Vietnam, Zambia, Zimbabwe
- Services: Environmental conservation, community development and education
- Methods: Public advocacy, grantmaking, sponsors research
- CEO: Jo Shaw
- Key people: Douglas Adams, William Todd-Jones, Rhino Boy Chris
- Revenue: £4,437,834 (2024)
- Disbursements: £4.3m during 2020-21
- Expenses: £4,656,455 (2024)
- Staff: 12 employees, 7 trustees (2024)
- Volunteers: 5 (2024)
- Website: www.savetherhino.org

Save the Rhino International (SRI) is a UK-based conservation charity. It is Europe's largest single-species rhino charity, in terms of funds raised, grants made, and profile and positioning. SRI began fundraising for in situ rhino conservation projects in 1992 and was formally registered as a charity in 1994. One of SRI's founder patrons was the British writer and humorist Douglas Adams, who was also known to be a conservation movement enthusiast.

== Mission ==
Save the Rhino International works to conserve viable populations of Critically Endangered rhinos in Africa and Asia. By funding field projects and through education, the goal of Save the Rhino is to deliver material, long-lasting and widespread benefits to rhinos and other endangered species, ecosystems, and the people living in these areas.

== Activities ==
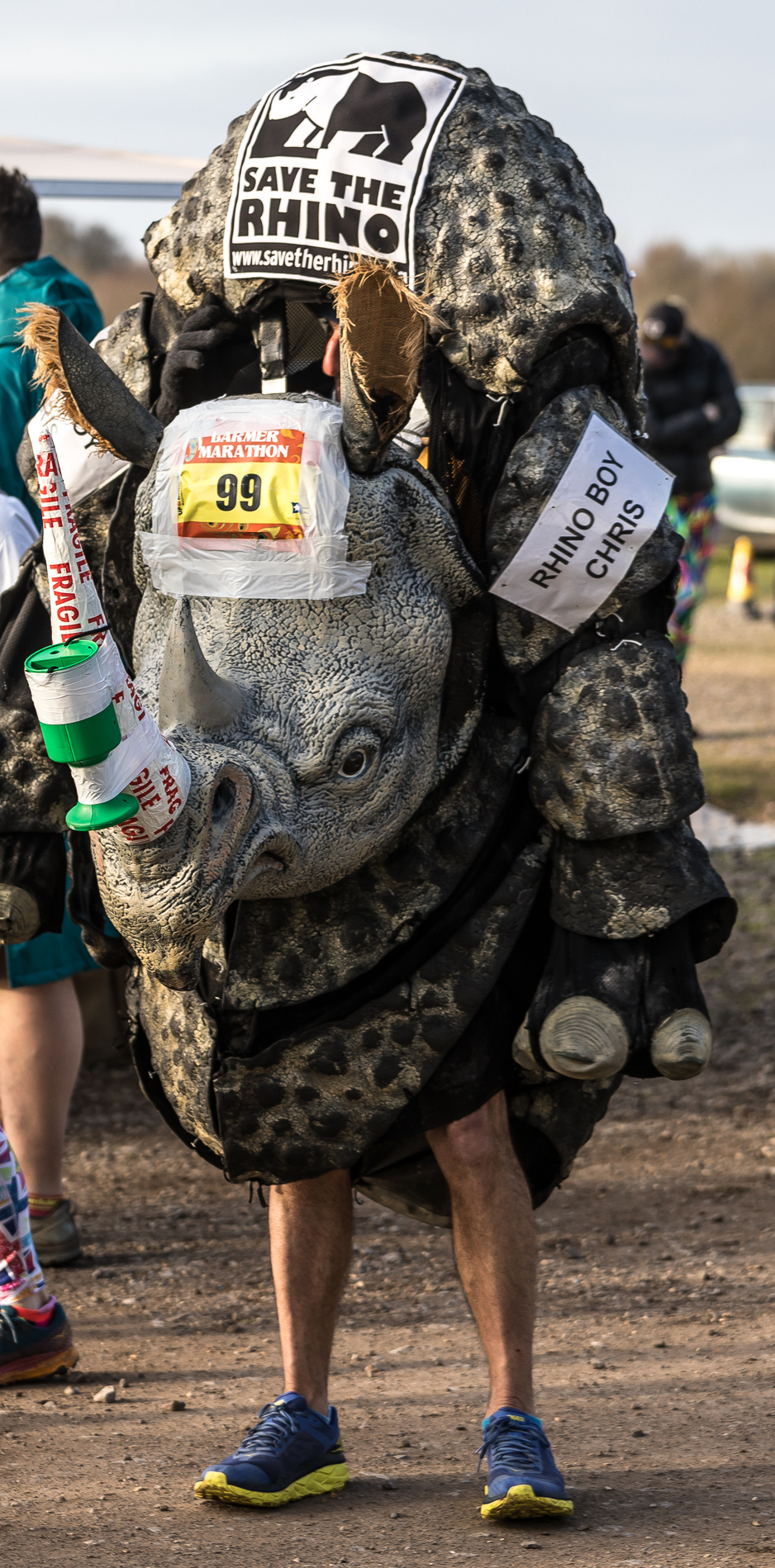
Rhino Boy Chris, a notable fundraiser for Save the Rhino, dressed in a rhinoceros costume to run a marathon

SRI raises funds to support projects for rhino conservation. These programs are used to develop sustainable methods by which local communities can manage natural resources and teach the public about the importance of preserving natural resources and address human-wildlife conflict issues. The funding is also utilized for direct assistance as well, such as anti-poaching and monitoring patrols, species translocation, research into threats to rhinos and alternatives to the use of rhino horn, and veterinary work.

== Trustees and Patrons ==
=== Trustees ===
- Alistair Weaver
- Claire Curtin
- George Stephenson
- Henry Chaplin
- Joe Steidl
- Megan Greenwood
- Sianne Haldane

=== Patrons ===
- Polly Adams
- Benedict Allen
- Clive Anderson
- Louise Aspinall
- Nick Baker
- Simon Barnes
- Mark Carwardine
- Chloe Chick
- Mark Coreth
- Dina de Angelo
- Robert Devereux
- Ben Hoskyns-Abrahall
- Angus Innes
- Destiny Gilliam
- Francesco Nardelli
- Martina Navratilova
- Julian Ozanne
- Viscount Petersham
- Mark Sainsbury
- Robin Saunders
- Alec Seccombe
- Tira Shubart
- James Sunley
- Nick Tims
- William Todd-Jones
- Jack Whitehall

== Campaigns ==
In 2005/6 the European Association of Zoos and Aquaria (EAZA) selected rhinoceros species as the subject of their annual fund-raising and awareness campaign, with direct input from SRI, raising a total of €660,000.

Extensive campaigns have also been run in Vietnam with the help of TV actor Paul Blackthorne and Arsenal F.C. footballer Aaron Ramsey.
