= Chris Greene =

Chris Greene may refer to:

- Chris Greene (broadcaster) (born 1988), Irish broadcaster and comedian
- Chris H. Greene, American physicist

== See also ==
- Christopher Greene (1737–1781), U.S. legislator and soldier
- Christopher Becker Greene (1901–1944)
- Chris Green (disambiguation)
- Christopher Green (disambiguation)
