= Christopher Green (legal scholar) =

American legal scholar

- Education: Princeton University (BA); Yale University (JD); University of Notre Dame (PhD)
- Occupation: Law professor

Christopher R. Green is an American legal scholar who is a professor at Ohio State University. He was previously a professor at the University of Mississippi School of Law also holding the James L. Whitten Chair of Law and Government. Prior to joining the law school he practiced law with Phelps Dunbar in Jackson, Mississippi, specializing in appellate litigation, and clerked for Judge Rhesa Barksdale of the U.S. Court of Appeals for the Fifth Circuit. Professor Green teaches Criminal Law, Constitutional Law, Federal Jurisdiction, Constitutional Law Seminar, Real Estate Transactions, and Commercial Paper.

== Early life and education ==
Green graduated summa cum laude from Princeton University, receiving the Lyman Hotchkiss Atwater Prize in Politics for the highest academic standing in the Politics Department and the John G. Buchanan Prize in Politics for the outstanding senior thesis in the Politics Department; he was a member of Phi Beta Kappa. Afterwards, Green enrolled at Yale Law School, where he was a senior editor of the Yale Law Journal.

== Academic career ==
Green has published articles including:

- "This Constitution": Constitutional Indexicals as a Basis for Textualist Semi-Originalism, 84 Notre Dame L. Rev. (2009)
- The Original Sense of the (Equal) Protection Clause: Subsequent Interpretation and Application, 19 Geo. Mason U. Civ. Rts. L.J. 219 (2009)
- The Original Sense of the (Equal) Protection Clause: Pre-Enactment History, 19 Geo. Mason U. Civ. Rts. L.J. 1 (2008)
- Punishing Corporations: The Food-Chain Schizophrenia in Punitive Damages and Criminal Law, 87 Neb. L. Rev. 197 (2008)
- The Food-Chain Issue for Corporate Punishment: What Criminal Law and Punitive Damages Can Learn from Each Other, Engage, Feb. 2008, at 40
- Suing One's Sense Faculties for Fraud: "Justifiable Reliance" in the Law as a Clue to Epistemic Justification, 36 Phil. Papers 49 (2007)
- Originalism and the Sense-Reference Distinction, 50 St. Louis U.L.J. 555 (2006).

His research projects after 2009 concern the punishment of corporations, the application of constitutional theory to the Fourteenth Amendment, the epistemology of testimony, memory, and perception, and the law and ethics of self-defense.
