= Kurt Danziger =

German-born Canadian academic (1926–2026)

- Born: 3 June 1926; Breslau, Lower Silesia, Prussia, Germany
- Died: 11 August 2026 (aged 100)
- Education: University of Cape Town; University of Oxford
- Known for: History of psychology
- Scientific career
- Fields: Psychology, History
- Workplaces: University of Melbourne; University of Natal; Gadjah Mada University; University of Cape Town; York University

Kurt Danziger (3 June 1926 – 11 August 2026) was a German-born academic whose work has focused on the history of psychology, particularly in the 20th century. His innovative contributions to this field have received widespread international recognition.

== Life and career ==
Danziger was born in Germany on 3 June 1926, and emigrated to South Africa at the age of 11. After receiving degrees in Chemistry and Psychology from the University of Cape Town, he continued his studies at the newly established Institute of Experimental Psychology at the University of Oxford in England. His work there involved standard 1940s psychology experiments using laboratory rats (e.g. Danziger, 1953). On completing his doctorate, he joined the University of Melbourne in Australia where he did research in developmental psychology, studying children's understanding of social relationships (e.g. Danziger, 1957).

In 1954, Danziger moved back to South Africa where social psychology soon became his main area of research. Following a two-year stay as Visiting Professor at Gadjah Mada University in Jogjakarta, Indonesia, Danziger returned to South Africa as Head of Psychology at the University of Cape Town. There he conducted some groundbreaking studies inspired by the sociology of knowledge (Danziger, 1963). This research was continued by others for many years afterwards and is still discussed (e. g. DuPreez et al., 1981; Finchilescu & Dawes, 1999; Leslie & Finchilescu, 2013). Danziger's time in Cape Town, and his eventual departure from South Africa, were marked by his opposition to the apartheid policies which were being enforced with increasing violence and brutality. This active opposition, both inside and outside the academy, eventually led to threats and reprisals on the part of what was becoming a repressive police state. He left South Africa for Canada in 1965 and was prohibited from returning until the collapse of the old system after 1990.

He took up an appointment as Professor of Psychology at York University, Toronto, where he continued to work in social psychology. His publications from this time include a textbook, Socialization (Danziger, 1971) and a monograph, Interpersonal Communication (Danziger, 1976), which were translated into several languages.

Danziger had a longstanding interest in the history of psychology and began intensive study of primary sources in the early 1970s. He became particularly interested in Wilhelm Wundt's work. Around the time of psychology's "centennial", marking the establishment of Wundt's laboratory in 1879, Danziger published a number of chapters and articles related to this topic (e.g. Danziger, 1979). However, during the 1980s, he became increasingly interested in the history of psychological research methods (e.g. Danziger, 1985). This interest culminated in what is probably Danziger's best-known book, Constructing the Subject: Historical Origins of Psychological Research (Danziger, 1990). Danziger was also interested in the history of psychological concepts and categories, and in a later book, Naming the Mind: How Psychology Found Its Language (Danziger, 1997), he traced the historical origins of modern psychological concepts like "behavior", "intelligence", "attitude", "personality" and "motivation". He continued this line of work in his book, Marking the Mind: A History of Memory (Danziger, 2008). The book is a wide-ranging history of the concept from Ancient Greece to the present. Much of the book consists of what Danziger calls 'historical psychology'. This field is to be distinguished from history of psychology in that it is concerned not so much with the theories and practices of psychologists but with the subject-matter of psychology and this sometimes has a longer history than the discipline itself (Danziger, 2003).

He was invited to contribute an autobiographical chapter to an edited collection titled, A History of Psychology in Autobiography, which was published in 2009. The contributors to the volume are eminent but unorthodox psychologists. Danziger's chapter is titled, "Confessions of a Marginal Psychologist" (Danziger, 2009).

Danziger returned to the theme of historical psychology in a book chapter titled, "Historical Psychology of Persons: Categories and Practice" (Danziger, 2012). He was involved in a debate with Daniel N. Robinson on the historiography of psychology in the December 2013 issue of Theory & Psychology (Danziger, 2013).

Danziger died on 11 August 2026, at the age of 100 (Huls, 2026; Long, 2026).

== Honours, awards and tributes ==
Danziger received many honours and awards during his career. He was elected as a Fellow of the Royal Society of Canada in 1989. In 1994, he received the Canadian Psychological Association's Award for Distinguished Contributions to Education and Training for his role in creating the graduate program in history and theory of psychology at York University, Toronto. He also received a Lifetime Achievement Award from the Society for the History of Psychology in 2000, an Honorary Doctorate in Social Science from the University of Cape Town in 2004 and a Lifetime Achievement Award from the History and Philosophy of Psychology Section of the Canadian Psychological Association in 2011.

Five symposia on Kurt Danziger's work have been organised since the publication of Constructing the Subject in 1990. The edited book, Rediscovering the History of Psychology: Essays Inspired by the Work of Kurt Danziger (Brock, Louw & van Hoorn, 2004) contains chapters by prominent historians of psychology from North America, Europe and South Africa, as well as a commentary on the chapters by Danziger. The book also contains a comprehensive bibliography of Danziger's publications from 1951 to 2003.

In 1994, one of Danziger's students, Adrian Brock conducted an interview which was published in a special issue of the History and Philosophy of Psychology Bulletin on Kurt Danziger (Brock, 1995). Danziger had always thought that this interview concentrated too much on him as a person and not enough on his work and so another, more work-focussed, interview was conducted many years later. The second interview was published in the journal, History of Psychology (Brock, 2006).

He is the subject of entries in the Encyclopedia of the History of Psychological Theories (2012), the Encyclopedia of Cross-Cultural Psychology (2013) and the Palgrave Encyclopedia of Theoretical and Philosophical Psychology (2026).

A symposium on his work is being planned for the Cheiron conference in Ottawa, Canada in 2027.
