= Christopher Green (paediatrician) =

Australian paediatrician and author (b. 1948)

Christopher Green OAM
- Born: 1948 (age 77–78)
- Occupations: Paediatrician, author
- Spouse(s): Hillary Green; Judy Halliday
- Writing career
- Genre: Parenting advice
- Notable work: Toddler Taming
- Notable awards: Order of Australia

Christopher Green is an Australian paediatrician and author of parenting guide books. He works as an honorary consultant to the Children's Hospital, Westmead, in Sydney and continues to release revised editions of his books, including Toddler Taming, Beyond Toddlerdom and Understanding ADHD. He is associated with the popularisation of the 'Controlled Crying' technique, a method he claims to have invented. Green was awarded the Order of Australia medal in 2004.

== Bibliography ==
- Toddler Taming
- Beyond Toddlerdom
- Toddler Taming Tips
- Understanding ADHD
