= Chris Green (White Ribbon Campaign) =

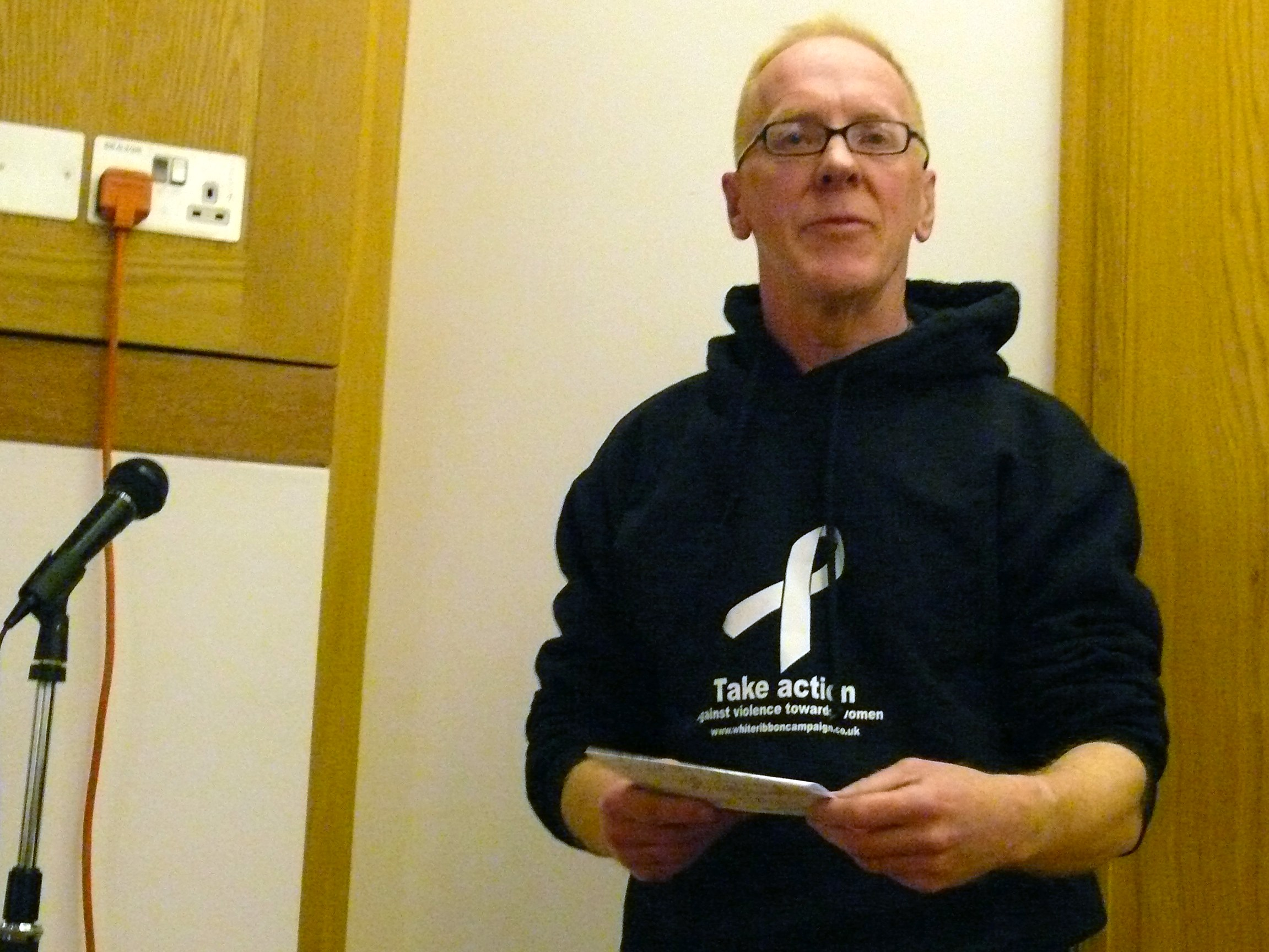
Chris Green in 2010

Christopher Steven Green OBE founded the White Ribbon Campaign (UK) in 2004. He served as the charity's director until 2019. He also served as the charity's CEO and president until 2020. In 2021 he co-founded Male Allies Challenging Sexism (MACS), a pro-feminist men's organisation that supports women's rights and stands in solidarity with the radical feminist / women's liberation movement. Green was previously a full-time lecturer at Manchester Metropolitan University.

Green grew up in North Harrow, London and was the youngest of three children.

In 2007, Green was awarded "Ultimate Man of the Year" by Cosmopolitan for his work with White Ribbon Campaign. He has addressed the Parliamentary Assembly of the Council of Europe, the Inter Parliamentary Union, the Oxford, Cambridge, and Durham Unions and many conferences on the theme of Engaging Men in Tackling Violence against Women. In 2012, he was appointed a UN Leader of Men by UN Secretary General Ban Ki Moon. He is author of the series of 12 leaflets, "What the White Ribbon Campaign says". He plays football twice a week and sings in a community choir.

He was a member of the Council of Europe Task Force to end violence against women, the Violence Prevention Alliance of the World Health Organization, and the steering group of the Men's Coalition.

He lives in Hebden Bridge, West Yorkshire where he sings with Calder Valley Voices, and the three Tonys as well as playing football for the Old Gits.

Green was appointed Officer of the Order of the British Empire (OBE) in the 2017 New Year Honours for services to equality.
