= History of psychology =

Psychology is defined as "the scientific study of behavior and mental processes". Philosophical interest in the human mind and behavior dates back to the ancient civilizations of Egypt, Persia, Greece, China, and India.

Psychology as a field of experimental study began in 1854 in the German city of Leipzig, when Gustav Fechner created the first theory of how judgments about sensory experiences are made and how to experiment on them. Fechner's theory, recognized today as Signal Detection Theory, foreshadowed the development of statistical theories of comparative judgment and thousands of experiments based on his ideas (Link, S. W. Psychological Science, 1995). In 1879, Wilhelm Wundt founded the first psychological laboratory dedicated exclusively to psychological research in Leipzig, Germany. Wundt was also the first person to refer to himself as a psychologist. A notable precursor to Wundt was Ferdinand Ueberwasser (1752–1812), who designated himself Professor of Empirical Psychology and Logic in 1783 and gave lectures on empirical psychology at the Old University of Münster, Germany. Other important early contributors to the field include Hermann Ebbinghaus (a pioneer in the study of memory), William James (the American father of pragmatism), and Ivan Pavlov (who developed the procedures associated with classical conditioning).

Soon after the development of experimental psychology, various kinds of applied psychology appeared. G. Stanley Hall brought scientific pedagogy to the United States from Germany in the early 1880s. John Dewey's educational theory of the 1890s was another example. Also in the 1890s, Hugo Münsterberg began writing about the application of psychology to industry, law, and other fields. Lightner Witmer established the first psychological clinic in the 1890s. James McKeen Cattell adapted Francis Galton's anthropometric methods to generate the first program of mental testing in the 1890s. In Vienna, meanwhile, Sigmund Freud independently developed an approach to the study of the mind called psychoanalysis, which became a highly influential theory in psychology.

The 20th century saw a reaction to Edward Titchener's critique of Wundt's empiricism. This contributed to the formulation of behaviorism by John B. Watson, which was popularized by B. F. Skinner through operant conditioning. Behaviorism proposed emphasizing the study of overt behavior, because it could be quantified and easily measured. Early behaviorists considered the study of the mind too vague for productive scientific study. However, Skinner and his colleagues did study thinking as a form of covert behavior to which they could apply the same principles as overt behavior.

The final decades of the 20th century saw the rise of cognitive science, an interdisciplinary approach to studying the human mind. Cognitive science again considers the mind as a subject for investigation, using the tools of cognitive psychology, linguistics, computer science, philosophy, behaviorism, and neurobiology. This form of investigation has proposed that a wide understanding of the human mind is possible, and that such an understanding may be applied to other research domains, such as artificial intelligence.

There are conceptual divisions of psychology in "forces" or "waves", based on its schools and historical trends. This terminology was popularized among the psychologists to differentiate a growing humanism in therapeutic practice from the 1930s onwards, called the "third force", in response to the deterministic tendencies of Watson's behaviourism and Freud's psychoanalysis. Proponents of Humanistic psychology included Carl Rogers, Abraham Maslow, Gordon Allport, Erich Fromm, and Rollo May. Their humanistic concepts are also related to existential psychology, Viktor Frankl's logotherapy, positive psychology (which has Martin Seligman as one of the leading proponents), C. R. Cloninger's approach to well-being and character development, as well as to transpersonal psychology, incorporating such concepts as spirituality, self-transcendence, self-realization, self-actualization, and mindfulness. In cognitive behavioral psychotherapy, similar terms have also been incorporated, by which "first wave" is considered the initial behavioral therapy; a "second wave", Albert Ellis's cognitive therapy; and a "third wave", with the acceptance and commitment therapy, which emphasizes one's pursuit of values, methods of self-awareness, acceptance and psychological flexibility, instead of challenging negative thought schemes. A "fourth wave" would be the one that incorporates transpersonal concepts and positive flourishing, in a way criticized by some researchers for its heterogeneity and theoretical direction dependent on the therapist's view. A "fifth wave" has now been proposed by a group of researchers seeking to integrate earlier concepts into a unifying theory.

== Early psychological thought ==
Many cultures throughout history have speculated on the nature of the mind, heart, soul, spirit, brain, etc. For instance, in Ancient Egypt, the Edwin Smith Papyrus contains an early description of the brain, and some speculations on its functions (described in a medical/surgical context) and the descriptions could be related to Imhotep who was the first Egyptian physician who anatomized and discovered the body of the human being. Though other medical documents of ancient times were full of incantations and applications meant to turn away disease-causing demons and other superstition, the Edwin Smith Papyrus gives remedies to almost 50 conditions and only two contain incantations to ward off evil.

Ancient Greek philosophers, from Thales (fl. 550 BC) through even to the Roman period, developed an elaborate theory of what they termed the psuchẽ (psyche) (from which the first half of "psychology" is derived), as well as other "psychological" terms – nous, thumos, logistikon, etc. Classical Greece (fifth century BC), philosophers taught "naturalism", the belief that laws of nature shape our world, as opposed to gods and demons determining human fate. Alcmaeon, for example, believed the brain, not the heart, was the "organ of thought. "He tracked the ascending sensory nerves from the body to the brain, theorizing that mental activity originated in the region where the central nervous system is located and that the cause of mental illness resided within the brain. He applied this understanding to classify mental diseases and treatments. One of the most influential Ancient Greek influences on psychology came from the accounts of Plato (especially in the Republic), Pythagoras and of Aristotle (esp. Peri Psyches, also known by its Latin title, De Anima).

Plato's tripartite theory of the soul, Chariot Allegory and concepts such as eros defined the subsequent Western Philosophy views of the psyche and anticipated modern psychological proposals. For example, concepts such as id, ego, super-ego and libido were interpreted by psychoanalysts as having been anticipated by Plato, to the extent that "in 1920, Freud decided to present Plato as the precursor of his own theory, as part of a strategy directed to define the scientific and cultural collocation of psychoanalysis".

Other Hellenistic philosophers, namely the Stoics and Epicurians, diverged from the Classical Greek tradition in several important ways, especially in their concern with questions of the physiological basis of the mind. The Roman physician Galen addressed these issues most elaborately and influentially of all. The Greek tradition influenced some Christian and Islamic thought on the topic.

In the Judeo-Christian tradition, the Manual of Discipline (from the Dead Sea Scrolls, c. 21 BC – 61 AD) notes the division of human nature into two temperaments or opposing spirits of either veracity or perversity.

Walter M. Freeman proposes that Thomism is the philosophical system explaining cognition that is most compatible with neurodynamics, in a 2008 article in the journal Mind and Matter entitled "Nonlinear Brain Dynamics and Intention According to Aquinas".

In Asia, China had a long history of administering tests of ability as part of its education system. Chinese texts from 2500 years ago mention neuropsychiatric illness, including descriptions of mania and psychosis with or without epilepsy. "Imbalance" was the mechanism of psychosis. Other conditions described include confusion, visual illusions, intoxication, stress, and even malingering. Psychological theories about stages of human development can be traced to the time of Confucius, about 2500 years ago.

In the 6th century AD, Lin Xie carried out an early experiment, in which he asked people to draw a square with one hand and at the same time draw a circle with the other (ostensibly to test people's vulnerability to distraction). It has been cited that this was the first psychology experiment.

India had a theory of "the self" in its Vedanta philosophical writings. Additionally, Indians thought about the individual's self as being enclosed by different levels known as koshas. Additionally, the Sankya philosophy said that the mind has five components, including manas (lower mind), ahankara (sense of I-ness), chitta (memory bank of mind), buddhi (intellect), and atman (self/soul). Patanjali was one of the founders of the yoga tradition, sometime between 200 and 400 BC (pre-dating Buddhist psychology) and a student of the Vedas. He developed the science of breath and mind and wrote his knowledge in the form of between 194 and 196 aphorisms called the Yoga Sutras of Patanjali. He developed modern Yoga for psychological resilience and balance. He is reputed to have used yoga therapeutically for anxiety, depression and mental disorders as common then as now. Buddhist philosophies have developed several psychological theories (see Buddhism and psychology), formulating interpretations of the mind and concepts such as aggregates (skandhas), emptiness (sunyata), non-self (anatta), mindfulness and Buddha-nature, which are addressed today by theorists of humanistic and transpersonal psychology. Several Buddhist lineages have developed notions analogous to those of modern Western psychology, such as the unconscious, personal development and character improvement, the latter being part of the Noble Eightfold Path and expressed, for example, in the Tathagatagarbha Sutra. Hinayana traditions, such as the Theravada, focus more on individual meditation, while Mahayana traditions also emphasize the attainment of a Buddha nature of wisdom (prajña) and compassion (karuṇā) in the realization of the boddhisattva ideal, but affirming it more metaphysically, in which charity and helping sentient beings is cosmically fundamental. Buddhist monk and scholar D. T. Suzuki describes the importance of the individual's inner enlightenment and the self-realization of the mind. Researcher David Germano, in his thesis on Longchenpa, also shows the importance of self-actualization in the dzogchen teaching lineage.

Medieval Muslim physicians also developed practices to treat patients with a variety of "diseases of the mind".

Ahmed ibn Sahl al-Balkhi (850–934) was among the first, in this tradition, to discuss disorders related to both the body and the mind. Al-Balkhi recognized that the body and the soul can be healthy or sick, or "balanced or imbalanced". He wrote that imbalance of the body can result in fever, headaches and other bodily illnesses, while imbalance of the soul can result in anger, anxiety, sadness and other nafs-related symptoms.

Avicenna, similarly, did early work in the treatment of nafs-related illnesses, and developed a system for associating changes in the mind with inner feelings. Avicenna also described phenomena we now recognize as neuropsychiatric conditions, including hallucination, mania, nightmare, melancholia, dementia, epilepsy and tremor.

Ancient and medieval thinkers who discussed issues related to psychology included:

- Socrates of Athens (c. 470 – 399 BC). Emphasized virtue ethics. In epistemology, understood dialectic to be central to the pursuit of truth.
- As early as the 4th century BC, the Greek physician Hippocrates theorized that mental disorders had physical rather than supernatural causes.
- Plato's tripartite theory of the soul, Chariot Allegory and concepts such as eros defined the subsequent Western Philosophy views of the psyche and anticipated modern psychological proposals.
- Alcmaeon theorizes the brain in the seat of the mind.
- In 387 BC, Plato suggested that the brain is where mental processes take place.
- Boethius and his work represented an imaginary psychological dialogue between himself and philosophy, with philosophy personified as a woman, arguing that despite the apparent inequality of the world.
- In the 6th century AD, Lin Xie carried out an early psychological analysis experiment. It has been cited that this was the first psychology experiment.
- Ali ibn Sahl Rabban al-Tabari, who developed al-‘ilaj al-nafs (sometimes translated as "psychotherapy"),
- Padmasambhava was the 8th-century medicine Buddha of Tibet, called from the then Buddhist India to tame the Tibetans, and was instrumental in developing Tibetan psychiatric medicine.
- Patanjali founded Yoga and the method of psychological balance and resilience through breathing exercises and inner peace.
- Abu al-Qasim al-Zahrawi (Abulcasis), described head surgery.
- Ibn Tufail, who anticipated the tabula rasa argument and nature versus nurture debate.
- William of Ockham who has lot of interests in writing about logic and invented occams razor.
- Thomas Aquinas whose works allocated notion regarded emotions.
- Albertus magnus describes metaphysical morals in psychology and philosophical theories.

Maimonides described rabies and belladonna intoxication.

Witelo is considered a precursor of perception psychology. His Perspectiva contains much material in psychology, outlining views that are close to modern notions on the association of idea and on the subconscious.

== Further development ==
Many of the Ancients' writings would have been lost without the efforts of Muslim, Christian, and Jewish translators in the House of Wisdom, the House of Knowledge, and other such institutions in the Islamic Golden Age, whose glosses and commentaries were later translated into Latin in the 12th century. However, it is not clear how these sources first came to be used during the Renaissance, and their influence on what would later emerge as the discipline of psychology is a topic of scholarly debate.

=== Etymology and the early usage of the word ===
The first print use of the term "psychology", that is, Greek-inspired neo-Latin psychologia, is dated to multiple works dated 1525. Etymology has long been attributed to the German scholastic philosopher Rudolf Göckel (1547–1628, often known under the Latin form Rodolphus Goclenius), who published the Psychologia hoc est: de hominis perfectione, animo et imprimis ortu hujus... in Marburg in 1590. Croatian humanist Marko Marulić (1450–1524) likely used the term in the title of a Latin treatise entitled Psichiologia de ratione animae humanae (c.1510–1517). Although the treatise itself has not been preserved, its title appears in a list of Marulic's works compiled by his younger contemporary, Franjo Bozicevic-Natalis in his "Vita Marci Maruli Spalatensis" (Krstić, 1964).

The term did not come into popular usage until the German Rationalist philosopher, Christian Wolff (1679–1754) used it in his works Psychologia empirica (1732) and Psychologia rationalis (1734). This distinction between empirical and rational psychology was picked up in Denis Diderot's (1713–1780) and Jean le Rond d'Alembert's (1717–1783) Encyclopédie (1751–1784) and was popularized in France by Maine de Biran (1766–1824). In England, the term "psychology" overtook "mental philosophy" in the middle of the 19th century, especially in the work of William Hamilton (1788–1856).

=== Enlightenment psychological thought ===
Early psychology was regarded as the study of the soul (in the Christian sense of the term). The modern philosophical form of psychology was heavily influenced by the works of René Descartes (1596–1650), and the debates that he generated, of which the most relevant were the objections to his Meditations on First Philosophy (1641), published with the text. Also important to the later development of psychology were his Passions of the Soul (1649) and Treatise on Man (completed in 1632 but, along with the rest of The World, withheld from publication after Descartes heard of the Catholic Church's condemnation of Galileo; it was eventually published posthumously, in 1664).

Although not educated as a physician, Descartes did extensive anatomical studies of bulls' hearts and was considered important enough that William Harvey responded to him. Descartes was one of the first to endorse Harvey's model of the circulation of the blood, but disagreed with his metaphysical framework to explain it. Descartes dissected animals and human cadavers and as a result was familiar with the research on the flow of blood leading to the conclusion that the body is a complex device that is capable of moving without the soul, thus contradicting the "Doctrine of the Soul". The emergence of psychology as a medical discipline was given a major boost by Thomas Willis, not only in his reference to psychology (the "Doctrine of the Soul") in terms of brain function, but through his detailed 1672 anatomical work, and his treatise De anima brutorum quae hominis vitalis ac sentitiva est: exercitationes duae ("Two Discourses on the Souls of Brutes"—meaning "beasts"). However, Willis acknowledged the influence of Descartes's rival, Pierre Gassendi, as an inspiration for his work.

The philosophers of the British Empiricist and Associationist schools had a profound impact on the later course of experimental psychology. John Locke's An Essay Concerning Human Understanding (1689), George Berkeley's Treatise Concerning the Principles of Human Knowledge (1710), and David Hume's A Treatise of Human Nature (1739–1740) were particularly influential, as were David Hartley's Observations on Man (1749) and John Stuart Mill's A System of Logic. (1843). Also notable was the work of some Continental Rationalist philosophers, especially Baruch Spinoza's (1632–1677) On the Improvement of the Understanding (1662) and Gottfried Wilhelm Leibniz's (1646–1716) New Essays on Human Understanding (completed 1705, published 1765). Another important contribution was Friedrich August Rauch's (1806–1841) book Psychology: Or, A View of the Human Soul; Including Anthropology (1840), the first English exposition of Hegelian philosophy for an American audience.

German idealism pioneered the proposition of the unconscious, which Jung considered to have been described psychologically for the first time by physician and philosopher Carl Gustav Carus. Also notable was its use by Friedrich Wilhelm Joseph von Schelling (1775–1835), and by Eduard von Hartmann in Philosophy of the Unconscious (1869); psychologist Hans Eysenck writes in Decline and Fall of the Freudian Empire (1985) that Hartmann's version of the unconscious is very similar to Freud's.

The Danish philosopher Søren Kierkegaard also influenced the humanistic, existential, and modern psychological schools with his works The Concept of Anxiety (1844) and The Sickness Unto Death (1849).

=== Transition to contemporary psychology ===
Also influential on the emerging discipline of psychology were debates surrounding the efficacy of Mesmerism (a precursor to hypnosis) and the value of phrenology. The former was developed in the 1770s by Austrian physician Franz Mesmer (1734–1815) who claimed to use the power of gravity, and later of "animal magnetism", to cure various physical and mental ills. As Mesmer and his treatment became increasingly fashionable in both Vienna and Paris, it also began to come under the scrutiny of suspicious officials. In 1784, an investigation was commissioned in Paris by King Louis XVI which included American ambassador Benjamin Franklin, chemist Antoine Lavoisier and physician Joseph-Ignace Guillotin (later the popularizer of the guillotine). They concluded that Mesmer's method was useless. Abbé Faria, an Indo-Portuguese priest, revived public attention in animal magnetism. Unlike Mesmer, Faria claimed that the effect was 'generated from within the mind' by the power of expectancy and cooperation of the patient. Although disputed, the "magnetic" tradition continued among Mesmer's students and others, resurfacing in England in the 19th century in the work of the physician John Elliotson (1791–1868), and the surgeons James Esdaile (1808–1859), and James Braid (1795–1860) (who reconceptualized it as property of the subject's mind rather than a "power" of the Mesmerist's, and relabeled it "hypnotism"). Mesmerism also continued to have a strong social (if not medical) following in England through the 19th century (see Winter, 1998). Faria's approach was significantly extended by the clinical and theoretical work of Ambroise-Auguste Liébeault and Hippolyte Bernheim of the Nancy School. Faria's theoretical position, and the subsequent experiences of those in the Nancy School made significant contributions to the later autosuggestion techniques of Émile Coué. It was adopted for the treatment of hysteria by the director of Paris's Salpêtrière Hospital, Jean-Martin Charcot (1825–1893).

Phrenology began as "organology", a theory of brain structure developed by the German physician, Franz Joseph Gall (1758–1828). Gall argued that the brain is divided into a large number of functional "organs", each responsible for particular human mental abilities and dispositions – hope, love, spirituality, greed, language, the abilities to detect the size, form, and color of objects, etc. He argued that the larger each of these organs are, the greater the power of the corresponding mental trait. Further, he argued that one could detect the sizes of the organs in a given individual by feeling the surface of that person's skull. Gall's ultra-localizationist position with respect to the brain was soon attacked, most notably by French anatomist Pierre Flourens (1794–1867), who conducted ablation studies (on chickens) which purported to demonstrate little or no cerebral localization of function. Although Gall had been a serious (if misguided) researcher, his theory was taken by his assistant, Johann Gaspar Spurzheim (1776–1832), and developed into the profitable, popular enterprise of phrenology, which soon spawned, especially in Britain, a thriving industry of independent practitioners. In the hands of Scottish religious leader George Combe (1788–1858) (whose book The Constitution of Man was one of the best-sellers of the century), phrenology became strongly associated with political reform movements and egalitarian principles (see, e.g., Shapin, 1975; but also see van Wyhe, 2004). Spurzheim soon spread phrenology to America as well, where itinerant practical phrenologists assessed the mental well-being of willing customers (see Sokal, 2001; Thompson 2021).

The development of modern psychology was closely linked to psychiatry in the eighteenth and nineteenth centuries (see History of psychiatry), when the treatment of the mentally ill in hospices was revolutionized after Europeans first considered their pathological conditions. In fact, there was no distinction between the two areas in psychotherapeutic practice, in an era when there was still no drug treatment (of the so-called psychopharmacologicy revolution from 1950) for mental disorders, and its early theorists and pioneering clinical psychologists generally had medical background. The first to implement in the Western a humanitarian and scientific treatment of mental health, based on Enlightenment ideas, were the French alienists, who developed the empirical observation of psychopathology, describing the clinical conditions, their physiological relationships and classifying them. It was called the rationalist-empirical school, which most known exponents were Pinel, Esquirol, Falret, Morel and Magnan. In the late nineteenth century, the French current was gradually overcome by the German field of study. At first, the German school was influenced by romantic ideals and gave rise to a line of mental process speculators, based more on empathy than reason. They became known as Psychiker, mentalists or psychologists, with different currents being highlighted by Reil (creator of the word "psychiatry"), Heinroth (first to use the term "psychosomatic") Ideler and Carus. In the middle of the century, a "somatic reaction" (somatiker) formed against the speculative doctrines of mentalism, and it was based on neuroanatomy and neuropathology. In it, those who made important contributions to the psychopathological classification were Griesinger, Westphal, Krafft-Ebbing and Kahlbaum, which, in their turn, would influence Wernicke and Meynert. Kraepelin revolutionized as the first to define the diagnostic aspects of mental disorders in syndromes, and the work of psychological classification was followed to the contemporary field by contributions from Schneider, Kretschmer, Leonhard, and Jaspers. In Great Britain, there stand out in the nineteenth century Alexander Bain founder of the first journal of psychology, Mind, and writer of reference books on the subject at the time, such as Mental Science: The Compendium of Psychology, and the History of Philosophy (1868), and Henry Maudsley. In Switzerland, Bleuler coined the terms "depth psychology", "schizophrenia", "schizoid" and "autism". In the United States, the Swiss psychiatrist Adolf Meyer maintained that the patient should be regarded as an integrated "psychobiological" whole and emphasized psychosocial factors, lending support to early conceptions of "psychosomatic medicine", a precursor to behavioral medicine and other fields.

== Emergence of German experimental psychology ==
Until the middle of the 19th century, psychology was widely regarded as a branch of philosophy. Whether it could become an independent scientific discipline was questioned already earlier on: Immanuel Kant (1724–1804) declared in his Metaphysical Foundations of Natural Science (1786) that psychology might perhaps never become a "proper" natural science because its phenomena cannot be quantified, among other reasons. Kant proposed an alternative conception of an empirical investigation of human thought, feeling, desire, and action, and lectured on these topics for over twenty years (1772/73–1795/96). His Anthropology from a Pragmatic Point of View (1798), which resulted from these lectures, looks like an empirical psychology in many respects.

Johann Friedrich Herbart (1776–1841) took issue with what he viewed as Kant's conclusion and attempted to develop a mathematical basis for a scientific psychology. Although he was unable to empirically realize the terms of his psychological theory, his efforts did lead scientists such as Ernst Heinrich Weber (1795–1878) and Gustav Theodor Fechner (1801–1887) to attempt to measure the mathematical relationships between the physical magnitudes of external stimuli and the psychological intensities of the resulting sensations. Fechner (1860) is the originator of the term psychophysics.

Meanwhile, individual differences in reaction time had become a critical issue in the field of astronomy, under the name of the "personal equation". Early researches by Friedrich Wilhelm Bessel (1784–1846) in Königsberg and Adolf Hirsch led to the development of a highly precise chronoscope by Matthäus Hipp that, in turn, was based on a design by Charles Wheatstone for a device that measured the speed of artillery shells (Edgell & Symes, 1906). Other timing instruments were borrowed from physiology (e.g., Carl Ludwig's kymograph) and adapted for use by the Utrecht ophthalmologist Franciscus Donders (1818–1899) and his student Johan Jacob de Jaager in measuring the duration of simple mental decisions.

The 19th century was also the period in which physiology, including neurophysiology, professionalized and saw some of its most significant discoveries. Among its leaders were Charles Bell (1774–1843) and François Magendie (1783–1855) who independently discovered the distinction between sensory and motor nerves in the spinal column, Johannes Müller (1801–1855) who proposed the doctrine of specific nerve energies, Emil du Bois-Reymond (1818–1896) who studied the electrical basis of muscle contraction, Pierre Paul Broca (1824–1880) and Carl Wernicke (1848–1905) who identified areas of the brain responsible for different aspects of language, as well as Gustav Fritsch (1837–1927), Eduard Hitzig (1839–1907), and David Ferrier (1843–1924) who localized sensory and motor areas of the brain. One of the principal founders of experimental physiology, Hermann Helmholtz (1821–1894), conducted studies of a wide range of topics that would later be of interest to psychologists – the speed of neural transmission, the natures of sound and color, and of our perceptions of them, etc. In the 1860s, while he held a position in Heidelberg, Helmholtz engaged as an assistant a young physician named Wilhelm Wundt. Wundt employed the equipment of the physiology laboratory – chronoscope, kymograph, and various peripheral devices – to address more complicated psychological questions than had, until then, been investigated experimentally. In particular he was interested in the nature of apperception – the point at which a perception occupies the central focus of conscious awareness.

In 1864 Wundt took up a professorship in Zürich, where he published his landmark textbook, Grundzüge der physiologischen Psychologie (Principles of Physiological Psychology, 1874). Moving to a more prestigious professorship in Leipzig in 1875, Wundt founded a laboratory specifically dedicated to original research in experimental psychology in 1879, the first laboratory of its kind in the world. In 1883, he launched a journal in which to publish the results of his, and his students', research, Philosophische Studien (Philosophical Studies) (For more on Wundt, see, e.g., Bringmann & Tweney, 1980; Rieber & Robinson, 2001). Wundt attracted a large number of students not only from Germany, but also from abroad. Among his most influential American students were G. Stanley Hall (who had already obtained a PhD from Harvard under the supervision of William James), James McKeen Cattell (who was Wundt's first assistant), and Frank Angell (who founded laboratories at both Cornell and Stanford). The most influential British student was Edward Bradford Titchener (who later became professor at Cornell).

Experimental psychology laboratories were soon also established at Berlin by Carl Stumpf (1848–1936) and at Göttingen by Georg Elias Müller (1850–1934). Another major German experimental psychologist of the era, though he did not direct his own research institute, was Hermann Ebbinghaus (1850–1909).

== Psychoanalysis ==
Experimentation was not the only approach to psychology in the German-speaking world at this time. Starting in the 1890s, employing the case study technique, the Viennese physician Sigmund Freud developed and applied the methods of hypnosis, free association, and dream interpretation to reveal putatively unconscious beliefs and desires that he argued were the underlying causes of his patients' "hysteria". He dubbed this approach psychoanalysis. Freudian psychoanalysis is particularly notable for the emphasis it places on the course of an individual's sexual development in pathogenesis. Psychoanalytic concepts have had a strong and lasting influence on Western culture, particularly on the arts. Although its scientific contribution is still a matter of debate, both Freudian and Jungian psychology revealed the existence of compartmentalized thinking, in which some behavior and thoughts are hidden from consciousness – yet operative as part of the complete personality. Hidden agendas, a bad conscience, or a sense of guilt, are examples of the existence of mental processes in which the individual is not conscious, through choice or lack of understanding, of some aspects of their personality and subsequent behavior.

Psychoanalysis examines mental processes which affect the ego. An understanding of these theoretically allows the individual greater choice and consciousness with a healing effect in neurosis and occasionally in psychosis, both of which Richard von Krafft-Ebing defined as "diseases of the personality".

Freud founded the International Psychoanalytic Association in 1910, inspired also by Ferenczi. Main theoretical successors were Anna Freud (his daughter) and Melane Klein, particularly in child psychoanalysis, both inaugurating competing concepts; in addition to those who became dissidents and developed interpretations different from Freud's psychoanalytic one, thus called by some neo-freudians, or more correctly post-freudians: the most known are Alfred Adler (individual psychology), Carl Gustav Jung (analytical psychology), Otto Rank, Karen Horney, Erik Erikson and Erich Fromm.

Jung was an associate of Freud's who later broke with him over Freud's emphasis on sexuality. Working with concepts of the unconscious first noted during the 1800s (by John Stuart Mill, Krafft-Ebing, Pierre Janet, Théodore Flournoy and others), Jung defined four mental functions which relate to and define the ego, the conscious self:

1. Sensation, which tell consciousness that something is there.
2. Feelings, which consist of value judgments, and motivate our reaction to what we have sensed.
3. Intellect, an analytic function that compares the sensed event to all known others and gives it a class and category, allowing us to understand a situation within a historical process, personal or public.
4. And intuition, a mental function with access to deep behavioral patterns, being able to suggest unexpected solutions or predict unforeseen consequences, "as if seeing around corners" as Jung put it.

Jung insisted on an empirical psychology on which theories must be based on facts and not on the psychologist's projections or expectations.

== Early American ==
Around 1875 the Harvard physiology instructor (as he then was), William James, opened a small experimental psychology demonstration laboratory for use with his courses. The laboratory was never used, at that time, for original research, and so controversy remains as to whether it is to be regarded as the "first" experimental psychology laboratory or not. In 1878, James gave a series of lectures at Johns Hopkins University entitled "The Senses and the Brain and their Relation to Thought" in which he argued, contra Thomas Henry Huxley, that consciousness is not epiphenomenal, but must have an evolutionary function, or it would not have been naturally selected in humans. The same year James was contracted by Henry Holt to write a textbook on the "new" experimental psychology. If he had written it quickly, it would have been the first English-language textbook on the topic. It was twelve years, however, before his two-volume The Principles of Psychology would be published. In the meantime textbooks were published by George Trumbull Ladd of Yale (1887) and James Mark Baldwin then of Lake Forest College (1889).

William James was one of the founders of the American Society for Psychical Research in 1885, which studied psychic phenomena (parapsychology), before the creation of the American Psychological Association in 1892. James was also president of the British society that inspired the United States' one, the Society for Psychical Research, founded in 1882, which investigated psychology and the paranormal on topics such as mediumship, dissociation, telepathy and hypnosis, and it innovated research in psychology, by which, according to science historian Andreas Sommer, were "devised methodological innovations such as randomized study designs" and conducted "the first experiments investigating the psychology of eyewitness testimony (Hodgson and Davey, 1887), [and] empirical and conceptual studies illuminating mechanisms of dissociation and hypnotism"; Its members also initiated and organised the International Congresses of Physiological/Experimental psychology.

In 1879 Charles Sanders Peirce was hired as a philosophy instructor at Johns Hopkins University. Although better known for his astronomical and philosophical work, Peirce also conducted what are perhaps the first American psychology experiments, on the subject of color vision, published in 1877 in the American Journal of Science (see Cadwallader, 1974). Peirce and his student Joseph Jastrow published "On Small Differences in Sensation" in the Memoirs of the National Academy of Sciences, in 1884. In 1882, Peirce was joined at Johns Hopkins by G. Stanley Hall, who opened the first American research laboratory devoted to experimental psychology in 1883. Peirce was forced out of his position by scandal and Hall was awarded the only professorship in philosophy at Johns Hopkins. In 1887 Hall founded the American Journal of Psychology, which published work primarily emanating from his own laboratory. In 1888 Hall left his Johns Hopkins professorship for the presidency of the newly founded Clark University, where he remained for the rest of his career.

Soon, experimental psychology laboratories were opened at the University of Pennsylvania (in 1887, by James McKeen Cattell), Indiana University (1888, William Lowe Bryan), the University of Wisconsin (1888, Joseph Jastrow), Clark University (1889, Edmund Sanford), the McLean Asylum (1889, William Noyes), and the University of Nebraska (1889, Harry Kirke Wolfe). However, it was Princeton University's Eno Hall, built in 1924, that became the first university building in the United States to be devoted entirely to experimental psychology when it became the home of the university's Department of Psychology.

In 1890, William James' The Principles of Psychology finally appeared, and rapidly became the most influential textbook in the history of American psychology. It laid many of the foundations for the sorts of questions that American psychologists would focus on for years to come. The book's chapters on consciousness, emotion, and habit were particularly agenda-setting.

One of those who felt the impact of James' Principles was John Dewey, then professor of philosophy at the University of Michigan. With his junior colleagues, James Hayden Tufts (who founded the psychology laboratory at Michigan) and George Herbert Mead, and his student James Rowland Angell, this group began to reformulate psychology, focusing more strongly on the social environment and on the activity of mind and behavior than the psychophysics-inspired physiological psychology of Wundt and his followers had heretofore. Tufts left Michigan for another junior position at the newly founded University of Chicago in 1892. A year later, the senior philosopher at Chicago, Charles Strong, resigned, and Tufts recommended to Chicago president William Rainey Harper that Dewey be offered the position. After initial reluctance, Dewey was hired in 1894. Dewey soon filled out the department with his Michigan companions Mead and Angell. These four formed the core of The Chicago School of Psychology.

In 1892, G. Stanley Hall invited 30-some psychologists and philosophers to a meeting at Clark with the purpose of founding a new American Psychological Association (APA). (On the history of the APA, see Evans, Staudt Sexton, & Cadwallader, 1992.) The first annual meeting of the APA was held later that year, hosted by George Stuart Fullerton at the University of Pennsylvania. Almost immediately tension arose between the experimentally and philosophically inclined members of the APA. Edward Bradford Titchener and Lightner Witmer launched an attempt to either establish a separate "Section" for philosophical presentations, or to eject the philosophers altogether. After nearly a decade of debate, a Western Philosophical Association was founded and held its first meeting in 1901 at the University of Nebraska. The following year (1902), an American Philosophical Association held its first meeting at Columbia University. These ultimately became the Central and Eastern Divisions of the modern American Philosophical Association.

In 1894, a number of psychologists, unhappy with the parochial editorial policies of the American Journal of Psychology approached Hall about appointing an editorial board and opening the journal out to more psychologists not within Hall's immediate circle. Hall refused, so James McKeen Cattell (then of Columbia) and James Mark Baldwin (then of Princeton) co-founded a new journal, Psychological Review, which rapidly grew to become a major outlet for American psychological researchers.

Beginning in 1895, James Mark Baldwin (Princeton, Hopkins) and Edward Bradford Titchener (Cornell) entered into an increasingly acrimonious dispute over the correct interpretation of some anomalous reaction time findings that had come from the Wundt laboratory (originally reported by Ludwig Lange and James McKeen Cattell). In 1896, James Rowland Angell and Addison W. Moore (Chicago) published a series of experiments in Psychological Review appearing to show that Baldwin was the more correct of the two. However, they interpreted their findings in light of John Dewey's new approach to psychology, which rejected the traditional stimulus-response understanding of the reflex arc in favor of a "circular" account in which what serves as "stimulus" and what as "response" depends on how one views the situation. The full position was laid out in Dewey's landmark article "The Reflex Arc Concept in Psychology" which also appeared in Psychological Review in 1896.

Titchener responded in Philosophical Review (1898, 1899) by distinguishing his austere "structural" approach to psychology from what he termed the Chicago group's more applied "functional" approach, and thus began the first major theoretical rift in American psychology between Structuralism and Functionalism. The group at Columbia, led by James McKeen Cattell, Edward L. Thorndike, and Robert S. Woodworth, was often regarded as a second (after Chicago) "school" of American Functionalism (see, e.g., Heidbredder, 1933), although they never used that term themselves, because their research focused on the applied areas of mental testing, learning, and education. Dewey was elected president of the APA in 1899, while Titchener dropped his membership in the association. (In 1904, Titchener formed his own group, eventually known as the Society of Experimental Psychologists.) Jastrow promoted the functionalist approach in his APA presidential address of 1900, and Angell adopted Titchener's label explicitly in his influential textbook of 1904 and his APA presidential address of 1906. In reality, Structuralism was, more or less, confined to Titchener and his students. (It was Titchener's former student E. G. Boring, writing A History of Experimental Psychology [1929/1950, the most influential textbook of the 20th century about the discipline], who launched the common idea that the structuralism/functionalism debate was the primary fault line in American psychology at the turn of the 20th century.) Functionalism, broadly speaking, with its more practical emphasis on action and application, better suited the American cultural "style" and, perhaps more important, was more appealing to pragmatic university trustees and private funding agencies.

== Early French ==
Jules Baillarger founded the Société Médico-Psychologique in 1847, one of the first associations of its kind and which published the Annales Medico-Psychologiques. France already had a pioneering tradition in psychological study, and it was relevant the publication of Précis d'un cours de psychologie ("Summary of a Psychology Course") in 1831 by Adolphe Garnier, who also published the Traité des facultés de l'âme, comprenant l'histoire des principales théories psychologiques ("Treatise of the Faculties of the Soul, comprising the history of major psychological theories") in 1852. Garnier was called "the best monument of psychological science of our time" by Revue des Deux Mondes in 1864.

In no small measure because of the conservatism of the reign of Louis Napoléon (president, 1848–1852; emperor as "Napoléon III", 1852–1870), academic philosophy in France through the middle part of the 19th century was controlled by members of the eclectic and spiritualist schools, led by figures such as Victor Cousin (1792–1867), Thédodore Jouffroy (1796–1842), and Paul Janet (1823–1899). These were traditional metaphysical schools, opposed to regarding psychology as a natural science. With the ouster of Napoléon III after the débacle of the Franco-Prussian War, new paths, both political and intellectual, became possible. From the 1870 forward, a steadily increasing interest in positivist, materialist, evolutionary, and deterministic approaches to psychology developed, influenced by, among others, the work of Hyppolyte Taine (1828–1893) (e.g., De L'Intelligence, 1870) and Théodule Ribot (1839–1916) (e.g., La Psychologie Anglaise Contemporaine, 1870).

In 1876, Ribot founded Revue Philosophique (the same year as Mind was founded in Britain), which for the next generation would be virtually the only French outlet for the "new" psychology (Plas, 1997). Although not a working experimentalist himself, Ribot's many books were to have profound influence on the next generation of psychologists. These included especially his L'Hérédité Psychologique (1873) and La Psychologie Allemande Contemporaine (1879). In the 1880s, Ribot's interests turned to psychopathology, writing books on disorders of memory (1881), will (1883), and personality (1885), and where he attempted to bring to these topics the insights of general psychology. Although in 1881 he lost a Sorbonne professorship in the History of Psychological Doctrines to traditionalist Jules Soury (1842–1915), from 1885 to 1889 he taught experimental psychology at the Sorbonne. In 1889 he was awarded a chair at the Collège de France in Experimental and Comparative Psychology, which he held until 1896 (Nicolas, 2002).

France's primary psychological strength lay in the field of psychopathology. The chief neurologist at the Salpêtrière Hospital in Paris, Jean-Martin Charcot (1825–1893), had been using the recently revivied and renamed (see above) practice of hypnosis to "experimentally" produce hysterical symptoms in some of his patients. Two of his students, Alfred Binet (1857–1911) and Pierre Janet (1859–1947), adopted and expanded this practice in their own work.

In 1889, Binet and his colleague Henri Beaunis (1830–1921) co-founded, at the Sorbonne, the first experimental psychology laboratory in France. Just five years later, in 1894, Beaunis, Binet, and a third colleague, Victor Henri (1872–1940), co-founded the first French journal dedicated to experimental psychology, L'Année Psychologique. In the first years of the 20th century, Binet was requested by the French government to develop a method for the newly founded universal public education system to identify students who would require extra assistance to master the standardized curriculum. In response, with his collaborator Théodore Simon (1873–1961), he developed the Binet–Simon Intelligence Test, first published in 1905 (revised in 1908 and 1911). Although the test was used to effect in France, it would find its greatest success (and controversy) in the United States, where it was translated into English by Henry H. Goddard (1866–1957), the director of the Training School for the Feebleminded in Vineland, New Jersey, and his assistant, Elizabeth Kite (a translation of the 1905 edition appeared in the Vineland Bulletin in 1908, but much better known was Kite's 1916 translation of the 1908 edition, which appeared in book form). The translated test was used by Goddard to advance his eugenics agenda with respect to those he deemed congenitally feeble-minded, especially immigrants from non-Western European countries. Binet's test was revised by Stanford professor Lewis M. Terman (1877–1956) into the Stanford–Binet IQ test in 1916. With Binet's death in 1911, the Sorbonne laboratory and L'Année Psychologique fell to Henri Piéron (1881–1964). Piéron's orientation was more physiological that Binet's had been.

Pierre Janet became the leading psychiatrist in France, being appointed to the Salpêtrière (1890–1894), the Sorbonne (1895–1920), and the Collège de France (1902–1936). In 1904, he co-founded the Journale de Psychologie Normale et Pathologique with fellow Sorbonne professor Georges Dumas (1866–1946), a student and faithful follower of Ribot. Whereas Janet's teacher, Charcot, had focused on the neurological bases of hysteria, Janet was concerned to develop a scientific approach to psychopathology as a mental disorder. His theory that mental pathology results from conflict between unconscious and conscious parts of the mind, and that unconscious mental contents may emerge as symptoms with symbolic meanings led to a public priority dispute with Sigmund Freud.

== Early British ==
Although the British had the first scholarly journal dedicated to the topic of psychology – Mind, founded in 1876 by Alexander Bain and edited by George Croom Robertson – it was quite a long while before experimental psychology developed there to challenge the strong tradition of "mental philosophy". The experimental reports that appeared in Mind in the first two decades of its existence were almost entirely authored by Americans, especially G. Stanley Hall and his students (notably Henry Herbert Donaldson) and James McKeen Cattell.

Francis Galton's (1822–1911) anthropometric laboratory opened in 1884. There people were tested on a wide variety of physical (e.g., strength of blow) and perceptual (e.g., visual acuity) attributes. In 1886 Galton was visited by James McKeen Cattell who would later adapt Galton's techniques in developing his own mental testing research program in the United States. Galton was not primarily a psychologist, however. The data he accumulated in the anthropometric laboratory primarily went toward supporting his case for eugenics. To help interpret the mounds of data he accumulated, Galton developed a number of important statistical techniques, including the precursors to the scatterplot and the product-moment correlation coefficient (later perfected by Karl Pearson, 1857–1936).

Soon after, Charles Spearman (1863–1945) developed the correlation-based statistical procedure of factor analysis in the process of building a case for his two-factor theory of intelligence, published in 1901. Spearman believed that people have an inborn level of general intelligence or g which can be crystallized into a specific skill in any of a number of narrow content area (s, or specific intelligence).

Laboratory psychology of the kind practiced in Germany and the United States was slow in coming to Britain. Although the philosopher James Ward (1843–1925) urged Cambridge University to establish a psychophysics laboratory from the mid-1870s forward, it was not until the 1891 that they put so much as £50 toward some basic apparatus (Bartlett, 1937). A laboratory was established through the assistance of the physiology department in 1897 and a lectureship in psychology was established which first went to W. H. R. Rivers (1864–1922). Soon Rivers was joined by C. S. Myers (1873–1946) and William McDougall (1871–1938). This group showed as much interest in anthropology as psychology, going with Alfred Cort Haddon (1855–1940) on the famed Torres Straits expedition of 1898.

In 1901 the Psychological Society was established (which renamed itself the British Psychological Society in 1906), and in 1904 Ward and Rivers co-founded the British Journal of Psychology.

== Early Russian ==
Insofar as psychology was regarded as the science of the soul and institutionally part of philosophy courses in theology schools, psychology was present in Russia from the second half of the 18th century. By contrast, if by psychology we mean a separate discipline, with university chairs and people employed as psychologists, then it appeared only after the October Revolution. All the same, by the end of the 19th century, many different kinds of activities called psychology had spread in philosophy, natural science, literature, medicine, education, legal practice, and even military science. Psychology was as much a cultural resource as it was a defined area of scholarship.

The question, "Who Is to Develop Psychology and How?", was of such importance that Ivan Sechenov, a physiologist and doctor by training and a teacher in institutions of higher education, chose it as the title for an essay in 1873. His question was rhetorical, for he was already convinced that physiology was the scientific basis on which to build psychology. The response to Sechenov's popular essay included one, in 1872–1873, from a liberal professor of law, Konstantin Kavelin. He supported a psychology drawing on ethnographic materials about national character, a program that had existed since 1847, when the ethnographic division of the recently founded Russian Geographical Society circulated a request for information on the people's way of life, including "intellectual and moral abilities". This was part of a larger debate about national character, national resources, and national development, in the context of which a prominent linguist, Alexander Potebnja, began, in 1862, to publish studies of the relation between mentality and language.

Although it was the history and philology departments that traditionally taught courses in psychology, it was the medical schools that first introduced psychological laboratories and courses on experimental psychology. As early as the 1860s and 1870s, I. M. Balinskii (1827–1902) at the Military-Surgical Academy (which changed its name in the 1880s to the Military Medical Academy) in St. Petersburg and Sergey Korsakov, a psychiatrist at Moscow university, began to purchase psychometric apparatus. Vladimir Bekhterev created the first laboratory—a special space for psychological experiments—in Kazan' in 1885. At a meeting of the Moscow Psychological Society in 1887, the psychiatrists Grigory Rossolimo and Ardalion Tokarskii (1859–1901) demonstrated both Wundt's experiments and hypnosis. In 1895, Tokarskii set up a psychological laboratory in the psychiatric clinic of Moscow university with the support of its head, Korsakov, to teach future psychiatrists about what he promoted as new and necessary techniques.

In January 1884, the philosophers Matvei Troitskii and Iakov Grot founded the Moscow Psychological Society. They wished to discuss philosophical issues, but because anything called "philosophical" could attract official disapproval, they used "psychological" as a euphemism. In 1907, Georgy Chelpanov announced a 3-year course in psychology based on laboratory work and a well-structured teaching seminar. In the following years, Chelpanov traveled in Europe and the United States to see existing institutes; the result was a luxurious four-story building for the Psychological Institute of Moscow with well-equipped laboratories, opening formally on March 23, 1914.

== Second generation German ==
=== Würzburg School ===
In 1896, one of Wilhelm Wundt's former Leipzig laboratory assistants, Oswald Külpe (1862–1915), founded a new laboratory in Würzburg. Külpe soon surrounded himself with a number of younger psychologists, the so-called Würzburg School, most notably Narziß Ach (1871–1946), Karl Bühler (1879–1963), Ernst Dürr (1878–1913), Karl Marbe (1869–1953), and Henry Jackson Watt (1879–1925). Collectively, they developed a new approach to psychological experimentation that flew in the face of many of Wundt's restrictions. Wundt had drawn a distinction between the old philosophical style of self-observation (Selbstbeobachtung) in which one introspected for extended durations on higher thought processes, and inner perception (innere Wahrnehmung) in which one could be immediately aware of a momentary sensation, feeling, or image (Vorstellung). The former was declared to be impossible by Wundt, who argued that higher thought could not be studied experimentally through extended introspection, but only humanistically through Völkerpsychologie (folk psychology). Only the latter was a proper subject for experimentation.

The Würzburgers, by contrast, designed experiments in which the experimental subject was presented with a complex stimulus (for example a Nietzschean aphorism or a logical problem) and after processing it for a time (for example interpreting the aphorism or solving the problem), retrospectively reported to the experimenter all that had passed through his consciousness during the interval. In the process, the Würzburgers claimed to have discovered a number of new elements of consciousness (over and above Wundt's sensations, feelings, and images) including Bewußtseinslagen (conscious sets), Bewußtheiten (awarenesses), and Gedanken (thoughts). In the English-language literature, these are often collectively termed "imageless thoughts", and the debate between Wundt and the Würzburgers, the "imageless thought controversy".

Wundt referred to the Würzburgers' studies as "sham" experiments and criticized them vigorously. Wundt's most significant English student, Edward Bradford Titchener, then working at Cornell, intervened in the dispute, claiming to have conducted extended introspective studies in which he was able to resolve the Würzburgers' imageless thoughts into sensations, feelings, and images. He thus, paradoxically, used a method of which Wundt did not approve in order to affirm Wundt's view of the situation.

The imageless thought debate is often said to have been instrumental in undermining the legitimacy of all introspective methods in experimental psychology and, ultimately, in bringing about the behaviorist revolution in American psychology. It was not without its own delayed legacy, however. Herbert A. Simon (1981) cites the work of one Würzburg psychologist in particular, Otto Selz (1881–1943), for having inspired him to develop his famous problem-solving computer algorithms (such as Logic Theorist and General Problem Solver) and his "thinking out loud" method for protocol analysis. In addition, Karl Popper studied psychology under Bühler and Selz in the 1920s, and appears to have brought some of their influence, unattributed, to his philosophy of science.

=== Gestalt psychology ===
Whereas the Würzburgers debated with Wundt mainly on matters of method, another German movement, centered in Berlin, took issue with the widespread assumption that the aim of psychology should be to break consciousness down into putative basic elements. Instead, they argued that the psychological "whole" has priority and that the "parts" are defined by the structure of the whole, rather than vice versa. Thus, the school was named Gestalt, a German term meaning approximately "form" or "configuration". It was led by Max Wertheimer (1880–1943), Wolfgang Köhler (1887–1967), and Kurt Koffka (1886–1941). Wertheimer had been a student of Austrian philosopher, Christian von Ehrenfels (1859–1932), who claimed that in addition to the sensory elements of a perceived object, there is an extra element which, though in some sense derived from the organization of the standard sensory elements, is also to be regarded as an element in its own right. He called this extra element Gestalt-qualität or "form-quality". For instance, when one hears a melody, one hears the notes plus something in addition to them which binds them together into a tune – the Gestalt-qualität. It is the presence of this Gestalt-qualität which, according to Ehrenfels, allows a tune to be transposed to a new key, using completely different notes, but still retain its identity. Wertheimer took the more radical line that "what is given me by the melody does not arise ... as a secondary process from the sum of the pieces as such. Instead, what takes place in each single part already depends upon what the whole is", (1925/1938). In other words, one hears the melody first and only then may perceptually divide it up into notes. Similarly in vision, one sees the form of the circle first – it is given "im-mediately" (i.e. its apprehension is not mediated by a process of part-summation). Only after this primary apprehension might one notice that it is made up of lines or dots or stars.

Gestalt-Theorie (Gestalt psychology) was officially initiated in 1912 in an article by Wertheimer on the phi-phenomenon; a perceptual illusion in which two stationary but alternately flashing lights appear to be a single light moving from one location to another. Contrary to popular opinion, his primary target was not behaviorism, as it was not yet a force in psychology. The aim of his criticism was, rather, the atomistic psychologies of Hermann von Helmholtz (1821–1894), Wilhelm Wundt (1832–1920), and other European psychologists of the time.

The two men who served as Wertheimer's subjects in the phi experiment were Köhler and Koffka. Köhler was an expert in physical acoustics, having studied under physicist Max Planck (1858–1947), but had taken his degree in psychology under Carl Stumpf (1848–1936). Koffka was also a student of Stumpf's, having studied movement phenomena and psychological aspects of rhythm. In 1917 Köhler (1917/1925) published the results of four years of research on learning in chimpanzees. Köhler showed, contrary to the claims of most other learning theorists, that animals can learn by "sudden insight" into the "structure" of a problem, over and above the associative and incremental manner of learning that Ivan Pavlov (1849–1936) and Edward Lee Thorndike (1874–1949) had demonstrated with dogs and cats, respectively.

The terms "structure" and "organization" were focal for the Gestalt psychologists. Stimuli were said to have a certain structure, to be organized in a certain way, and that it is to this structural organization, rather than to individual sensory elements, that the organism responds. When an animal is conditioned, it does not simply respond to the absolute properties of a stimulus, but to its properties relative to its surroundings. To use a favorite example of Köhler's, if conditioned to respond in a certain way to the lighter of two gray cards, the animal generalizes the relation between the two stimuli rather than the absolute properties of the conditioned stimulus: it will respond to the lighter of two cards in subsequent trials even if the darker card in the test trial is of the same intensity as the lighter one in the original training trials.

In 1921 Koffka published a Gestalt-oriented text on developmental psychology, Growth of the Mind. With the help of American psychologist Robert Ogden, Koffka introduced the Gestalt point of view to an American audience in 1922 by way of a paper in Psychological Bulletin. It contains criticisms of then-current explanations of a number of problems of perception, and the alternatives offered by the Gestalt school. Koffka moved to the United States in 1924, eventually settling at Smith College in 1927. In 1935 Koffka published his Principles of Gestalt Psychology. This textbook laid out the Gestalt vision of the scientific enterprise as a whole. Science, he said, is not the simple accumulation of facts. What makes research scientific is the incorporation of facts into a theoretical structure. The goal of the Gestaltists was to integrate the facts of inanimate nature, life, and mind into a single scientific structure. This meant that science would have to swallow not only what Koffka called the quantitative facts of physical science but the facts of two other "scientific categories": questions of order and questions of Sinn, a German word which has been variously translated as significance, value, and meaning. Without incorporating the meaning of experience and behavior, Koffka believed that science would doom itself to trivialities in its investigation of human beings.

Having survived the onslaught of the Nazis up to the mid-1930s, all the core members of the Gestalt movement were forced out of Germany to the United States by 1935. Köhler published another book, Dynamics in Psychology, in 1940 but thereafter the Gestalt movement suffered a series of setbacks. Koffka died in 1941 and Wertheimer in 1943. Wertheimer's long-awaited book on mathematical problem-solving, Productive Thinking, was published posthumously in 1945 but Köhler was now left to guide the movement without his two long-time colleagues.

== Emergence of behaviorism in America ==
As a result of the conjunction of a number of events in the early 20th century, behaviorism gradually emerged as the dominant school in American psychology. First among these was the increasing skepticism with which many viewed the concept of consciousness: although still considered to be the essential element separating psychology from physiology, its subjective nature and the unreliable introspective method it seemed to require, troubled many. William James' 1904 Journal of Philosophy.... article "Does Consciousness Exist?", laid out the worries explicitly.

Second was the gradual rise of a rigorous animal psychology. In addition to Edward Lee Thorndike's work with cats in puzzle boxes in 1898, the start of research in which rats learn to navigate mazes was begun by Willard Small (1900, 1901 in American Journal of Psychology). Robert M. Yerkes's 1905 Journal of Philosophy... article "Animal Psychology and the Criteria of the Psychic" raised the general question of when one is entitled to attribute consciousness to an organism. The following few years saw the emergence of John Broadus Watson (1878–1959) as a major player, publishing his dissertation on the relation between neurological development and learning in the white rat (1907, Psychological Review Monograph Supplement; Carr & Watson, 1908, J. Comparative Neurology & Psychology). Another important rat study was published by Henry H. Donaldson (1908, J. Comparative Neurology & Psychology). The year 1909 saw the first English-language account of Ivan Pavlov's studies of conditioning in dogs (Yerkes & Morgulis, 1909, Psychological Bulletin).

A third factor was the rise of Watson to a position of significant power within the psychological community. In 1908, Watson was offered a junior position at Johns Hopkins by James Mark Baldwin. In addition to heading the Johns Hopkins department, Baldwin was the editor of the influential journals, Psychological Review and Psychological Bulletin. Only months after Watson's arrival, Baldwin was forced to resign his professorship due to scandal. Watson was suddenly made head of the department and editor of Baldwin's journals. He resolved to use these powerful tools to revolutionize psychology in the image of his own research. In 1913 he published in Psychological Review the article that is often called the "manifesto" of the behaviorist movement, "Psychology as the Behaviorist Views It". There he argued that psychology "is a purely objective experimental branch of natural science", "introspection forms no essential part of its methods..." and "The behaviorist... recognizes no dividing line between man and brute". The following year, 1914, his first textbook, Behavior went to press. Although behaviorism took some time to be accepted as a comprehensive approach (see Samelson, 1981), (in no small part because of the intervention of World War I), by the 1920s Watson's revolution was well underway. The central tenet of early behaviorism was that psychology should be a science of behavior, not of the mind, and rejected internal mental states such as beliefs, desires, or goals. Watson himself, however, was forced out of Johns Hopkins by scandal in 1920. Although he continued to publish during the 1920s, he eventually moved on to a career in advertising (see Coon, 1994).

Among the behaviorists who continued on, there were a number of disagreements about the best way to proceed. Neo-behaviorists such as Edward C. Tolman, Edwin Guthrie, Clark L. Hull, and B. F. Skinner debated issues such as (1) whether to reformulate the traditional psychological vocabulary in behavioral terms or discard it in favor of a wholly new scheme, (2) whether learning takes place all at once or gradually, (3) whether biological drives should be included in the new science in order to provide a "motivation" for behavior, and (4) to what degree any theoretical framework is required over and above the measured effects of reinforcement and punishment on learning. By the late 1950s, Skinner's formulation had become dominant, and it remains a part of the modern discipline under the rubric of Behavior Analysis. Its application (Applied Behavior Analysis) has become one of the most useful fields of psychology.

Behaviorism was the ascendant experimental model for research in psychology for much of the 20th century, largely due to the creation and successful application (not least of which in advertising) of conditioning theories as scientific models of human behaviour.

== Second generation francophone ==
=== Genevan School ===
In 1918, Jean Piaget (1896–1980) turned away from his early training in natural history and began post-doctoral work in psychoanalysis in Zurich. Later Piaget rejected psychoanalysis, as he thought it was insufficiently empirical. In 1919, he moved to Paris to work at the Binet-Simon Lab. However, Binet had died in 1911 and Simon lived and worked in Rouen. His supervision therefore came (indirectly) from Pierre Janet, Binet's old rival and a professor at the Collège de France.

The job in Paris was relatively simple: to use the statistical techniques he had learned as a natural historian, studying molluscs, to standardize Cyril Burt's intelligence test for use with French children. Yet without direct supervision, he soon found a remedy to this boring work: exploring why children made the mistakes they did. Applying his early training in psychoanalytic interviewing, Piaget began to intervene directly with the children: "Why did you do that?" (etc.) It was from this that the ideas formalized in his later stage theory first emerged.

In 1921, Piaget moved to Geneva to work with Édouard Claparède at the Rousseau Institute. They formed what is now known as the Genevan School. In 1936, Piaget received his first honorary doctorate from Harvard. In 1955, the International Center for Genetic Epistemology was founded: an interdisciplinary collaboration of theoreticians and scientists, devoted to the study of topics related to Piaget's theory. In 1969, Piaget received the "distinguished scientific contributions" award from the American Psychological Association.

== Soviet Marxist psychology ==
In the early twentieth century, Ivan Pavlov's behavioral and conditioning experiments became the most internationally recognized Russian achievements. With the creation of the Soviet Union in 1922, Marxism was introduced as an overall philosophical and methodological framework in scientific research. In 1920s, state ideology promoted a tendency to the psychology of Bekhterev's reflexologist reductionism in its Marxist interpretation and to historical materialism, while idealistic philosophers and psychologists were harshly criticized. Another variation of Marxist version of psychology that got popularity mostly in Moscow and centered in the local Institute of Psychology was Konstantin Kornilov's (the Director of this Institute) reactology that became the main view, besides a small group of the members of the Vygotsky-Luria Circle that, besides its namesakes Lev Vygotsky, and Alexander Luria, included Bluma Zeigarnik, Alexei Leontiev and others, and in 1920s embraced a deterministic "instrumental psychology" version of Cultural-historical psychology. Many works by Vygotsky were not published chronologically because of Soviet censorship but primarily because of Vygotsky's failure to build a consistent psychological theory of consciousness.

A few attempts were made in 1920s at formulating the core of theoretical framework of the "genuinely Marxist" psychology, but all these failed and were characterized in early 1930s as either right- or left-wing deviations of reductionist "mechanicism" or "menshevising idealism". It was Sergei Rubinstein in mid 1930s, who formulated the key principles, on which the entire Soviet variation of Marxist psychology would be based, and, thus become the genuine pioneer and the founder of this psychological discipline in the Marxist disguise in the Soviet Union.

In late 1940s-early 1950s, Lysenkoism somewhat affected Russian psychology, yet gave it a considerable impulse for a reaction and unification that resulted in institutional and disciplinary integration of psychological community in the postwar Soviet Union.

== Cognitivism ==
Noam Chomsky's (1959) review of Skinner's book Verbal Behavior (which aimed to explain language acquisition in a behaviorist framework) is considered one of the major theoretical challenges to the type of radical (as in 'root') behaviorism that Skinner taught. Chomsky claimed that language could not be learned solely from the sort of operant conditioning that Skinner postulated. Chomsky argued that people could produce an infinite variety of sentences unique in structure and meaning and that these could not possibly be generated solely through the experience of natural language. As an alternative, he concluded that there must be internal mental structures – states of mind of the sort that behaviorism rejected as illusory. The issue is not whether mental activities exist; it is whether they can be shown to be the causes of behavior. Similarly, the work by Albert Bandura showed that children could learn by social observation, without any change in overt behaviour, and so must (according to him) be accounted for by internal representations.

The rise of computer technology also promoted the metaphor of mental function as information processing. This, combined with a scientific approach to studying the mind, as well as a belief in internal mental states, led to the rise of cognitivism as the dominant model of the mind.

Links between brain and nervous system function were also becoming common, partly due to the experimental work of people like Charles Sherrington and Donald Hebb, and partly due to studies of people with brain injury (see cognitive neuropsychology). With the development of technologies for accurately measuring brain function, neuropsychology and cognitive neuroscience have become some of the most active areas in contemporary psychology.

With the increasing involvement of other disciplines (such as philosophy, computer science, and neuroscience) in the quest to understand the mind, the umbrella discipline of cognitive science has been created as a means of focusing such efforts constructively.

== Scholarly journals ==
There are three "primary journals" where specialist histories of psychology are published:

- History of Psychology (journal)
- Journal of the History of the Behavioral Sciences
- History of the Human Sciences

In addition, there are a large number of "friendly journals" where historical material can often be found.Burman, J. T. (2018). "What Is History of Psychology? Network Analysis of Journal Citation Reports, 2009-2015". SAGE Open. 8 (1) 2158244018763005: 215824401876300. doi:10.1177/2158244018763005. These are discussed in History of Psychology (discipline).

== See also ==
- History of behavioral neuroscience
- History of clinical psychology
- History of cognitive neuroscience
- History of cognitive science
- History of evolutionary psychology
- History of experimental psychology
- History of hypnosis
- History of mental disorders
- History of neurology
- History of neuropsychology
- History of neurophysiology
- History of psychiatry
- History of psychotherapy
- History of sociology
- History of science
- Applied psychology
- Basic science (psychology)
- Psychophysics
- Psychology of art
- Psychology of religion
- Kurt Danziger
- Timeline of psychology
- Archives of the History of American Psychology
