= Francesco Nardelli =

Italian naturalist (born 1953)

Francesco Romano Nardelli (born 5 September 1953 in Rome, Italy, where he currently lives) is an Italian naturalist who has dedicated his life to the protection and conservation of endangered species. He is also the co-founder, with John Aspinall, of the Sumatran Rhino Project, one of the most important coordinated efforts to save a critically endangered species.

== Career ==
=== Early career ===
In 1972 Nardelli established the private Wild Felids Breeding Centre near Rome where he successfully bred in captivity several threatened species including the red-shanked douc langur Pygathrix nemaeus, the snow leopard Uncia uncia, and the clouded leopard Neofelis nebulosa, all the first ever bred in Italy.

In 1980 he moved to England where he became Curator of Howletts and Port Lympne Zoo, John Aspinall’s Zoos in Kent. There he was curator of several breeding programmes including the African elephant Loxodonta africana, (first ever bred in UK), western lowland gorilla Gorilla g. gorilla, siamang Symphalangus syndactylus, red-shanked douc langur Pygathrix nemaeus surili langurs Presbytis sp. clouded leopard Neofelis nebulosa, and snow leopard Uncia uncia.

=== Sumatran Rhino Project ===
In 1982 he conceived of and directed the Sumatran Rhino Project, the first international program for the conservation of the Sumatran rhino Dicerorhinus sumatrensis. That project was and remains a collaborative effort involving – for the first time – national governments, local agencies, European and Asian conservation centres and international zoological institutions to save this species from extinction.

Under Nardelli's leadership, the Indonesian Government, Howletts and Port Lympne Zoo , the Cincinnati, San Diego, New York and Los Angeles zoos all played a crucial role in the success of the project. This plan is continuing under the Department of Forest Protection and Nature Conservation of the Indonesian Government assisted by the UK based Save the Rhino International, the US’s International Rhino Foundation and other agencies.

The project resulted in the Indonesian government's signature of a rhino conservation agreement in 1985, the first time Jakarta has signed such an agreement and decided to participate in a coordinated international programme for the protection of an endangered species. Today the Sumatran rhino has a scattered population of around 300 individuals in the wild. Another legacy of the Sumatran Rhino Project is that several conservation agencies in Europe and North America are committed to save these very few surviving animals.

Among other success stories related to this programme is the birth in captivity of three calves of Sumatran rhinos at the Cincinnati Zoo: on 13 September 2001. Andalas, a male, was the first of his species born in captivity since 1889 . His mother, Emi, has since had two more calves in Cincinnati: a female, Suci, born in 2004 and a male, Harapan, born in 2007. "Ten years ago many people were skeptical claiming this species would never breed in a zoo. Yet today, the Cincinnati Zoo is world-renowned for being the only place in the world this species is breeding successfully in captivity," said Dr Terri Roth, Vice President of Conservation, Science and Living Collections at the Cincinnati Zoo. On 29 April 2007, Emi became the first Sumatran rhino in history to produce three calves in captivity, breaking her very own record.

=== Yayasan Badak Indonesia ===
In 1987 he co-founded the Yayasan Badak Indonesia (Indonesian Rhino Foundation) in Jakarta, a non-profit organization for the long-term conservation of rhinos in South-East Asia and is a patron of Save the Rhino, since 2003.

=== Today ===
Today Francesco Nardelli collaborates with Save the Rhino International and IUCN/SSC Asian Rhino Specialist Group on projects for the protection of Indonesian rhinos and promotes several conservation projects in Italy and abroad. His work with wild mammals, in particular with the Sumatran rhino, makes Francesco Nardelli a recognized naturalist and Italian conservationist.

== Publications ==
Nardelli's commitment to the protection and conservation of Sumatran rhinos inspired him to write “The Rhinoceros” (Basilisk Press, London) a monograph featuring coloured plates by renowned wildlife artist Matthew Hillier, describing the life and history of the five surviving species of rhinoceroses. In 2025, Francesco Nardelli and Kurt Heißig co-authored a taxonomic study on the Javan rhinoceros titled: A taxonomic review of the genus Rhinoceros with emphasis on the distinction of Eurhinoceros (Perissodactyla, Rhinocerotidae).

Nardelli regularly contributes articles to British, Italian, and Indonesian magazines and newspapers on the themes of conservation and protection of endangered species

== Hobbies ==
As an aquarium hobbyist, he is an accredited “Master of Natural Layouts” of the Soto Zen School.
