= Christopher D. Green =

Canadian psychologist and philosopher

Christopher Darren Green (born 1959) is a Canadian professor emeritus of psychology at York University in Toronto, Ontario, Canada. He has been cross-appointed to the graduate philosophy and science and technology studies programs as well. His research mostly pertains to the history of psychology, though he also writes on methodological and statistical issues in psychology.

Green is a Fellow of the American Psychological Association. He is a former president of APA Division 26, the Society for the History of Psychology. He was editor of the Journal of the History of the Behavioral Sciences, 2006–2008, and is the current Editor of the journal History of Psychology. His graduate training was in psychological aesthetics and computational cognitive science.

== Early life ==
Green was born in Sacramento, California in 1959. His father, a native of San Francisco, was an undergraduate student of English and drama at the time. His mother was born in Ohio and raised near Detroit, Michigan. She moved to California in the early 1950s.

The year after his birth, Green's family moved Salt Lake City, Utah for two years. They moved to the San Francisco Bay Area in 1962, living in the suburbs south of the city. His father earned an MA at San Jose State University, then went to the doctoral program in drama at Stanford University in 1970. Green attended Lewis M. Terman Jr. High School (now the Ellen T. Fletcher Middle School) for grades seven through nine. He played trumpet in a variety of student bands and orchestras.

In 1974, his father took a professorship at Bishop's University in Lennoxville, Québec. Green attended Alexander Galt Regional High School there for grades 10 and 11. He also learned several trades around the university's theater, doing set-building, lighting, and sound. In 1976, Green moved to the Montréal area to attend Vanier CEGEP where he earned a Diplôme d'études collégiales (DEC) in music with a specialization in jazz.

In 1979, he enrolled in music at McGill University but, by the end of the year, had become disenchanted with his future prospects as a professional musician. He transferred to the department of psychology where he discovered an interest in cognitive psychology from a course he took from Tony Marley. He also took a course in symbolic logic from Anil Gupta. Green was also a disk jockey at the student radio station.

After one year in psychology, Green dropped out of university. He worked in a cafeteria and busked guitar in a subway station for a year. During the summer of 1982, he moved back to his parents' home in Lennoxville and enrolled at Bishop's University to finish his psychology degree. His honours thesis supervisor was Anton DeMan. Another of his primary mentors was Stuart McKelvie. Green also worked in the theater, served as copy editor for the student newspaper (The Campus) and, in his second year, was elected president of the Bishop's Student Council. He completed his degree in 1984 and applied to several graduate programs in psychology, but was not accepted. He decided to remain at Bishop's for the 1984–85 school year, where he spent most of his time working as a lighting and sound assistant at the university theater. He was the sound operator for a concert played by the legendary blues musician, Brownie McGhee. Green also wrote a political column for The Campus under the pseudonym "#9."

== Graduate education ==
After his additional year at Bishop's, Green applied to graduate school again, this time in both psychology and theater. He was accepted at Simon Fraser University in psychology and at the University of Victoria in theater. He chose the former. Beginning at Simon Fraser in 1985, Green's MA supervisor was Bernard Lyman, who admired the Gestalt psychologists and sought to revive E. B. Titchener's method of rigorous introspection. In addition to the required psychology courses, Green took several philosophy courses (aesthetics, philosophy of mind, philosophy of science) during his master's degree. His thesis research involved factor analyzing responses to artworks. Nothing from the thesis was ever published, but the research process brought to Green's attention the Golden Section, a topic to which he would later return. Considering the possibility of specializing in statistics, Green took several math courses at the start of his PhD. He had begun writing his major doctoral essays (on philosophy of science and psychology) when his supervisor, Lyman, became ill, dying in December 1988.

Green transferred to the University of Toronto, where his new doctoral supervisor, John M. Kennedy, a one-time student of J. J. Gibson, was just beginning pioneering work on whether blind people use the same graphical artistic conventions as sighted people when they draw. Green became interested in computational cognitive science and audited courses in connectionism taught by Geoffrey Hinton. One of his closest mentors at Toronto was the theoretical psychologist, André Kukla. His dissertation topic was to develop connectionist networks that could correctly solve problems in deductive logic. He completed his PhD in 1992.

== Career ==
Finding no full-time academic position immediately after graduation, Green remained at Toronto, where he was given the title of "Special Lecturer" and taught various courses. In 1992 he published a paper on the history of operationism, which had grown out of his unfinished doctoral papers at Simon Fraser and was, for many years, among his most popular articles. He applied for dozens more academic positions the following year, mostly in cognition. He was hired by York University in Toronto in July 1993. He joined York's History & Theory of Psychology graduate program (now Historical, Theoretical, & Critical Studies in Psychology). He taught undergraduate courses mainly on cognition, perception, statistics, and the history of psychology. At the graduate level, he taught seminars on cognition, the history of psychology, and the work of Michel Foucault. Starting about 1997, his undergraduate teaching narrowed to only statistics. In 1995, he published a review of psychological research on the aesthetics of the Golden Section, which soon became his most-cited article. Among Green's most important mentors during his early years at York were Raymond Fancher, the senior figure in the History & Theory of Psychology program, and Andrew Winston, a historian of psychology at the University of Guelph.

He became interested in the World Wide Web and created webpages and e-mail lists for several scholarly organizations in which he was involved: Divisions 24 (theory) and 26 (history) of the American Psychological Association, Cheiron: The International Society for the History of Behavioral and Social Sciences, the International Society for Theoretical Psychology, and Section 25 (history & philosophy) of the Canadian Psychological Association, among others. He was tenured and promoted to Associate Professor in 1997. Late in 1997, he began work on the "Classics in the History of Psychology" website, which ultimately housed electronic editions of over 200 publications of historical importance in psychology. The Classics site garnered tens of millions of hits during its first few years and is now a recommended site by various universities.

Green was made a Fellow of the American Psychological Association (through the History Division (26)) in 2000, primarily for his internet activities. He was also presented a Special Service Award by History Division (26) of the APA in 2002. In 2004, he was made a Fellow of the Teaching Division (2) of APA as well. He was promoted to Full Professor by York that same year.

In 1998, Green had returned to the University of Toronto to start a second PhD, in the philosophy of science. His supervisor was a professor he had known during his previous stint there, William Seager, best known for his work on the theory of consciousness. Progress on the dissertation was slow, but he completed the degree in 2004. His dissertation returned to the topic of cognitive science, investigating whether connectionist networks served as "scientific models," as that phrase is understood in philosophy. He showed that one popular class of connectionist networks, which are made up of units that are usually thought of as being idealized analogs of neurons (thus the nickname "neural nets"), seemed to perform worse rather than better as more realistic neurological assumptions were built into their operation.

Having more or less satisfied his interests in computational cognitive science, in the first years of the 21st century Green began to retool as a historian of science. First, he wrote a couple of pieces on the mid-19th-century computational work of Charles Babbage and Ada Lovelace. In 2003, he finally published a book on ancient Greek and Roman psychological thought that he had co-authored with a graduate school friend, Philip Groff, mostly during the mid-1990s. After that, his main historical interests turned to North American psychology, especially around the turn of the 20th century. He worked on the rise and fall of Functionalism, creating two video documentaries on the topic in addition to several articles and book chapters. In October and November 2006, he wrote the bulk of English Wikipedia's history of psychology entry. In 2009, he co-edited with Ludy T. Benjamin Jr. a book on the pre-history of sport psychology. From 2006 to 2008 he served as editor of the Journal of the History of the Behavioral Sciences. Late in 2007, he was elected President-Elect of the History of Division of the APA, serving as President mainly in 2009.

About 2010, he began using the new digital methods that were starting to capture various regions of the humanities and applying them to the study of the history of psychology. In 2011, he formed a "laboratory" with his York colleague, Michael Pettit and a number of students. They named themselves the "PsyBorgs." In 2012, Green and Pettit won a research grant from the Social Sciences and Humanities Research Council of Canada (SSHRC) to support this work. Green and his colleagues published several articles in which complete runs of journal articles over decades of time were represented as nodes in a series of networks. These networks visually depicted the intellectual structure of the discipline at various periods in time — e.g., which topics were popular, how various topics were related to each other in terms of the vocabularies they used, and how these disciplinary structures changed over time from the 1880s to the 1920s. He also co-authored with his students digital studies of history's most prolific and most influential psychologists. In August 2018, the book that he had been working for nearly a decade was published, Psychology and Its Cities: A New History of Early American Psychology. His current research is focused on the historical use and misuse of statistical analysis in psychology. In 2020 he won a Visiting Researcher Fellowship at the Centre for Contemporary and Digital History at the University of Luxembourg. Due to travel restrictions during the global COVID-19 pandemic, he did not take the fellowship up until the fall of 2021. Also in 2021, Green was given a Career Achievement Award by the Society for the History of Psychology (APA, Div. 26).

Green's most active (former) graduate students include Cathy Faye and Jennifer Bazar (currently Director and Assistant Director, respectively, of the Cummings Center for the History of Psychology at the University of Akron), Jeremy Burman (currently teaching in the Theory & History of Psychology Programme at the University of Groningen in the Netherlands), Jacy Young (formerly at Quest University), and Arlie Belliveau (currently in Vancouver). An earlier doctoral student, Daniel Denis, is teaching at the University of Montana.
