= Rhino Boy Chris =

British marathon runner and conservationist

Chris Green
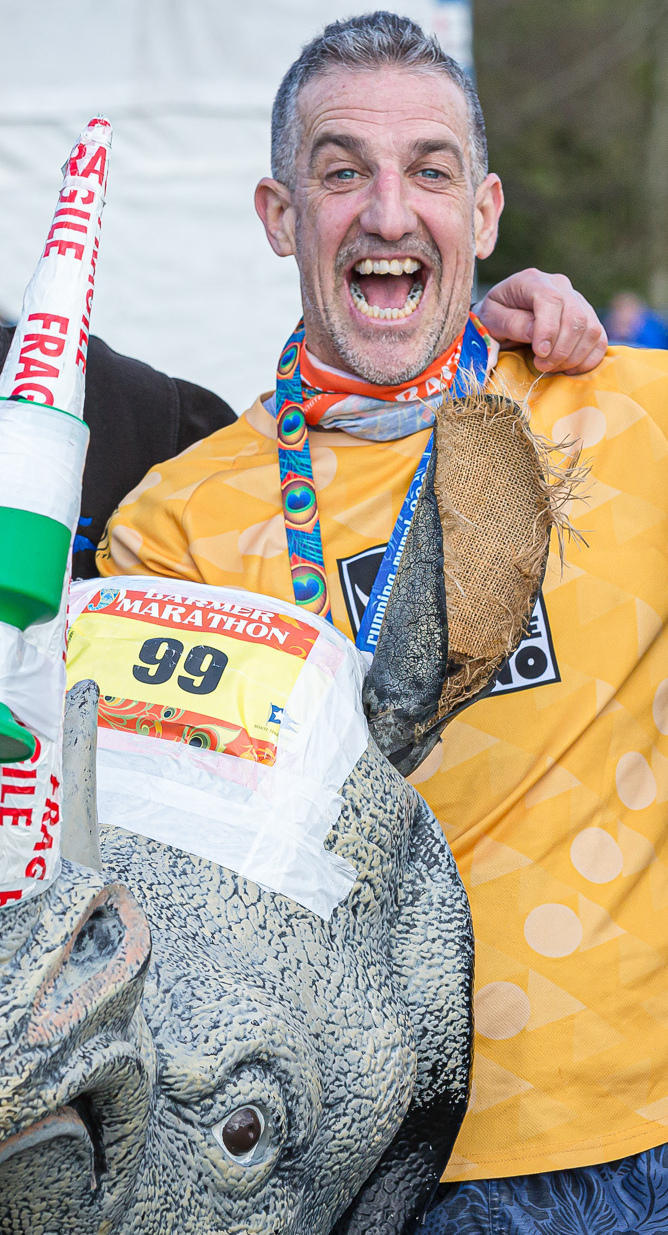
- Chris Green in 2022
- Born: July 20, 1975 (age 50); Christchurch, Dorset, England
- Occupation(s): Removals operator, marathon runner, conservationist
- Years active: 2009–present
- Organization: Save the Rhino
- Known for: Charity marathon running and conservation fundraising

Chris Green (born 20 July 1975), known as Rhino Boy Chris, is a British marathon runner and conservationist. An ambassador for Save the Rhino, he is known for completing long-distance races while wearing a rhinoceros costume to raise awareness and funds for rhino conservation. As of April 2025, he has completed over 150 marathons, half-marathons, and ultramarathons for the cause and holds several Guinness World Records.

== Early life ==
Green was born in Christchurch, Dorset, England. At the age of five, during a family trip to Kenya, he developed a fascination with rhinos. Learning about the threats facing rhinoceroses, he became passionate about wildlife conservation from an early age.

== Running career and conservation work ==
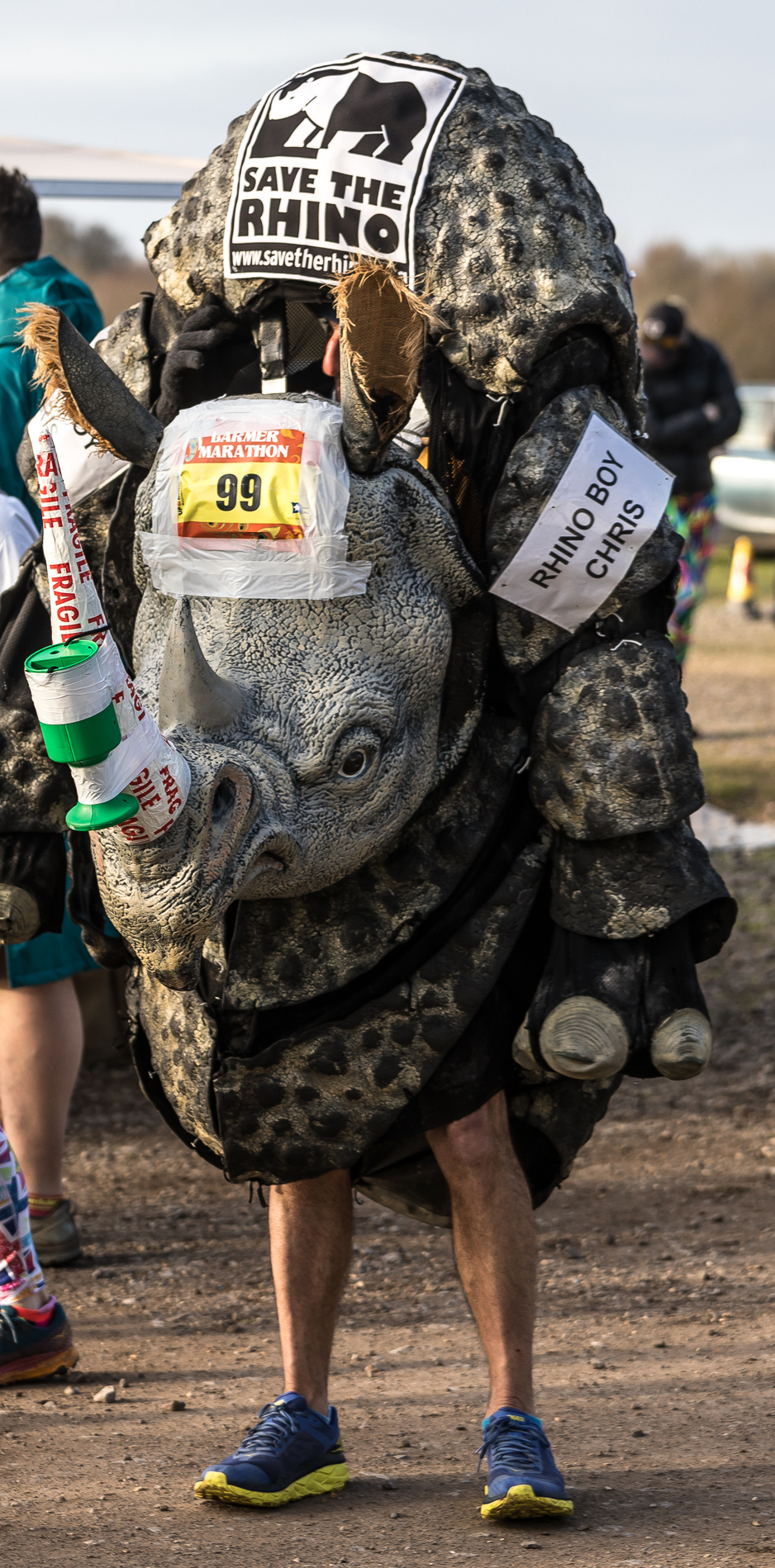
Green in his full rhinoceros costume in 2022

In 2009, Green began running marathons to support rhino conservation. That same year, he acquired a custom-built 10 kg rhino costume he named "Spike", which he began wearing during races to attract attention and raise funds.

Since then, Green has participated in more than 150 long-distance events, including half-marathons, marathons, and ultramarathons. He has been featured in numerous media outlets for his dedication to conservation and his distinctive race-day attire.

As a committed fundraiser and awareness campaigner, Green has completed various endurance feats beyond standard races, such as:

- Running from London to Oxford (100 miles) in 24 hours
- A 50-mile ultramarathon along the River Thames
- Virtually climbing Mount Kilimanjaro in his rhino suit during the COVID-19 lockdowns

As of the 2025 London Marathon, Green has completed 113 marathons wearing "Spike", earning him the Guinness World Record for the most marathons run in the same three-dimensional costume (male). In total, he has raised over £37,000 for Save the Rhino.

== Guinness World Records ==
- Fastest marathon dressed as a three-dimensional animal (male) – 4:32:26, 2019 London Marathon
- Fastest marathon dressed as a mammal (male) – 4:06:35, 2021 London Marathon
- Fastest half marathon dressed as a mammal – 1:50:05, 2021 Great North Run (record later broken)
- Most marathons run in the same three-dimensional costume (male) – 113 marathons, 2025 London Marathon

== Other activities ==
Outside of running, Green works as a removals operator. He is also a children's book author, having published Matumaini, the Rhino's Hope in 2020. He regularly visits schools in the UK wearing the rhino costume to educate children about wildlife conservation.

== Bibliography ==
- Matumaini, the Rhino's Hope (2020). ISBN 978-1838750091
