= Neuropsychology Review =

- Discipline: Neuropsychology
- Language: English
- Edited by: Stephen C. Bowden, David W. Loring

Publication details
- History: 1990-present
- Publisher: Springer Science+Business Media
- Frequency: Quarterly
- Impact factor: 4.894 (2017)

Standard abbreviations
- ISO 4: Neuropsychol. Rev.

Indexing
- CODEN: NERVEJ
- ISSN: 1040-7308 (print); 1573-6660 (web)
- OCLC no.: 44514076

Links
- Journal homepage

Neuropsychology Review is a peer-reviewed medical journal published by Springer Science+Business Media covering all aspects of neuropsychology.
