= Harry Kirke Wolfe =

American psychologist (1858–1918)

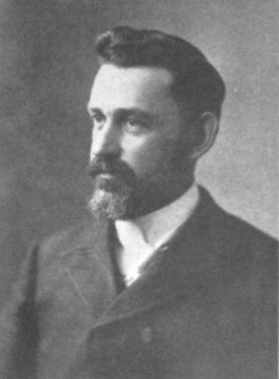
- Born: November 10, 1858; Bloomington, Illinois, US
- Died: July 30, 1918 (aged 59); Wheatland, Wyoming, US
- Resting place: Wyuka Cemetery
- Education: University of Nebraska
- Occupation: Psychologist
- Spouse: Katherine Brandt Wolfe (m. 1888)
- Parents: Jacob Vance Wolfe (father); Eliza Ellen Batterhorn (mother)

Harry Kirke Wolfe (November 10, 1858 – July 30, 1918) was a prominent early American psychologist.

== Early life ==
Harry Kirke Wolfe was born on November 10, 1858, to Jacob Vance Wolfe and Eliza Ellen Batterhorn in Bloomington, Illinois. Both of his parents were teachers. Before her marriage, Ellen Batterhorn taught in public schools and was eventually elected the chair of mathematics at Glendale Woman's College in Glendale, Ohio. After their marriage Jacob Wolfe taught for many years in Illinois and in Gosport, Indiana. Harry was the oldest of their nine children, two of whom died before the age of two. When Harry was thirteen his family moved to a farm near Lincoln, Nebraska. As the eldest son Harry was responsible for working on the farm. He had a deep love of books and often read while walking behind the plow.

== Education ==
Wolfe was in one of the first students to enter the then fledgling University of Nebraska. He arrived in a time of much controversy for the University, when people were unsure if the state could afford to support a university. There was much controversy within the university regarding the curriculum, which had expanded to include medicine, agriculture, and engineering as well as the establishment of mandatory chapel, military drill, and religious instruction. For an unknown reason Wolfe was excused for two of his four years of compulsory military drills. Wolfe studied a diverse range of topics during his schooling and after a rough start, he was a very successful student in his junior and senior years, earning nine A's and 3 B's. As a senior Wolfe took a course that would eventually have ties to his later career: a year-long mandatory class for all seniors on mental and moral philosophy. Wolfe earned his undergraduate degree from the university in 1880.

Though he could have continued his education at one of many American graduate programs, Wolfe decided instead to travel to the University of Berlin, well-known at the time for its innovative curriculum. Upon arrival in Berlin, Wolfe began to pursue a degree in the classics with the intention of returning to the United States as a college or university professor. Very little is known about Wolfe's three-year stay in Germany, though it is known that he took a course in psychology and a noter entitled "Fundamentals of Experimental Psychology" in his second semester. Both classes were taught by Hermann Ebbinghaus.

In the fall of 1884 Wolfe ended his time in Berlin, for unknown reasons, and traveled to Leipzig to study with Wilhelm Wundt. A possible explanation for this is that Ebbinghaus did not have professorial rank and was unable to supervise Wolfe's doctoral thesis, which he would write in psychology, no longer pursuing a degree in classics. Wolfe was only the second American student to earn a degree under Wundt (the first being James McKeen Cattell).

In 1886 Wolfe published his doctoral thesis, on tonal memory (Untersuchungen das Tongedächtnis). Wolfe chose to investigate retention by the method of recognition, a method that requires a stimulus to be present and the subject to make a judgment about the stimulus. This paradigm lends itself well to psychophysical methods which are what Wolfe used in his research on memory for tones. He believed that recognition memory was a simpler and more basic memory process that recognized objects or events as familiar or unfamiliar.

== Career ==
After his graduation from the University of Nebraska Wolfe spent the next three years teaching and working as a principal in three different Nebraska public schools.

In the fall of 1889, Wolfe and his wife Katherine Brandt Wolfe (they married on December 16, 1888) returned to Nebraska where he was offered a position as chair of the philosophy department. Upon arrival he wasted no time in pressing that scientific psychology and education be added to the curriculum. His teaching courses in "General Psychology" and then "Experimental psychology" led to the building of a psychology laboratory which was built partially in support of the class but also for Wolfe to conduct his own research in. In 1895 George Washington Andrew Luckey to the department was hired to teach pedagogy taking over some of Wolfe's courses. At this time Wolfe added a new course "Seminar for Experimental Psychology" to the psychology curriculum. This course enabled him to gain for work he was already doing: directing original research projects for his students, each student was required to carry out a research experiment of their own design.

Wolfe was a part of the founding of the Nebraska Society for Child Study which was formed in 1895. He was elected to the executive committee in one of the two at-large seats. They created an advisory board to assist in round tables and planning meetings and conducting research. One position on this board was "professor of experimental psychology" a position clearly created in reference to Wolfe. In the years following the creation of the society Wolfe was a frequent speaker at local round tables, education meetings, to parent groups and at some commencement activities. He was a popular speaker, knowledgeable about the child study literature, and inspiring in his call for people to join the "greatest educational movement" the world has ever experienced.

Wolfe also helped to found The American Journal of Psychology. He taught at the University of Nebraska until his death from a heart attack in Wheatland, Wyoming, on July 30, 1918. This occurred six weeks after he and other faculty were charged by the University of Nebraska Board of Regents with "hesitating, halting and negative support of the government" (during World War I). He and his fellow professors were accused of having "improper attitudes", which communicated even unintentionally, might cause someone else, such as a student, to not support the war effort. This was seen as more than adequate cause for dismissal.

He was buried at Wyuka Cemetery in Lincoln.

Wolfe spent twenty-one and a half years as a college professor. During that time he worked largely with undergraduate students, although he did supervise some master's degree students in education after 1895 and some master's degree students in philosophy and psychology in 1906. Among Wolfe's students were many who went on to be successful as attorneys, business owners and particularly as school teachers and administrators. Twenty-two of his students went on to become successful in the discipline of psychology. Three of Wolfe's students later served as presidents of the American Psychological Association.

== Quotes ==
"Too much obedience may ruin character, may dwarf the intellect, may paralyse the will of children and of adults."
