= History of the Human Sciences =

- Discipline: History of the social sciences
- Language: English
- Edited by: Felicity Callard, Rhodri Hayward, Angus Nicholls, Chris Renwick

Publication details
- History: 1988-present
- Publisher: SAGE Publications
- Frequency: 5/year
- Impact factor: 0.397 (2016)

Standard abbreviations
- ISO 4: Hist. Hum. Sci.

Indexing
- ISSN: 0952-6951 (print); 1461-720X (web)
- LCCN: 92642356
- OCLC no.: 41551836

Links
- Journal homepage; Online access; Online archive

History of the Human Sciences is a peer-reviewed academic journal that covers research on the history of the human sciences. Its editors-in-chief are Felicity Callard (University of Durham), Rhodri Hayward (Queen Mary University of London), Angus Nicholls (Queen Mary University of London) and Chris Renwick (University of York). The book reviews editor is Chris Millard (Sheffield University) and the web editor is Des Fitzgerald (Cardiff University). The journal was established in 1988 and is published by SAGE Publications. The previous editor was James Good (University of Durham).

The journal provides comprehensive coverage of a range of themes across the human sciences. Special issues and sections have been devoted to such topics as: psychotherapy in historical perspective, the Frankfurt School, the social and human sciences across the Iron Curtain, Vyotsky, Norbert Elias and process sociology, historians in the archive, the invention of the psychosocial, and Hans Blumenberg.

== Abstracting and indexing ==
History of the Human Sciences is abstracted and indexed in Academic Search Premier, the Arts and Humanities Citation Index, Current Contents, the International Bibliography of the Social Sciences, Scopus, and the Social Sciences Citation Index. According to the Journal Citation Reports, the journal has a 2016 impact factor of 0.397.
