= Journal of the History of the Behavioral Sciences =

- Discipline: History of science
- Language: English
- Edited by: Alexandra Rutherford

Publication details
- History: 1965-present
- Publisher: John Wiley & Sons
- Frequency: Quarterly
- Impact factor: 0.69 (2023)

Standard abbreviations
- ISO 4: J. Hist. Behav. Sci.

Indexing
- CODEN: JHBSA5
- ISSN: 0022-5061 (print); 1520-6696 (web)
- LCCN: 00238274
- OCLC no.: 01783134

Links
- Journal homepage; Online access; Online archive

The Journal of the History of the Behavioral Sciences is a quarterly peer-reviewed academic journal covering the history of social and behavioral sciences. It was established in 1965 and is published by John Wiley & Sons. The editor-in-chief is Alexandra Rutherford (York University). According to the Journal Citation Reports, the journal has a 2023 impact factor of 0.69. It was ranked 22nd out of 34 journals in the category "History of Social Sciences".
