= Creative synthesis =

Idea in psychology

The principle of creative synthesis was first mentioned by Wilhelm Wundt in 1862. He wanted to identify the different elements of consciousness and to see what laws govern the connections of these different elements. It started with the fact that colors, touches, and the spoken were not seen as the decoding of stimuli or the reception and storage of the things that are received into the brain from the external world. Wundt believed that instead, these factors are seen as the brain's subjective reactions to external stimuli that enter into our sensory systems. This is the concept of creative synthesis.

This theory shifted towards the emphasis on principles concerned with emotion, motivation, and volition as it had matured. These three ideas compete with one another, with the idea of creative synthesis at the center. This relates to the fact that Wundt viewed the mind as "active, creative, dynamic, and volitional." Volitional acts are creative but they are not free. This viewpoint could be assumed due to Wundt's deterministic view. Behind every volitional action that occurs, there were mental laws that acted on the contents of the consciousness. The shift in the goal-directed activity may have occurred, but it was already determined to change from the original plan. The sensory organs can be described endlessly in physics and other sciences, but these descriptions do not include explanations of the psychological qualities that are experienced. Qualities such as "sweet", "heavy", "painful" or "dark blue" are ones that can only be studied in a brain that is still able to react to experiences around it.

There are no psychological qualities in physics. For example, there is no red, or green, or blue in that world. Redness, greenness, and blueness are phenomena that are created by the cortex of the experiencing individual. A musical quality, the flavor or the wine, or the familiarity of a face is a rapid creative synthesis that cannot, in principle, be explained as a mere sum of elemental physical features.

A key feature of creative synthesis is that mental capacities are more than the sum of their parts. In all psychical combinations, the product is more than the sum of their different parts that are combined; what occurs is a new creation altogether. By this, it is meant that they are generative (creative) in every aspect. There is a real novelty and creativity in higher cognitive operations.

== Two-stage process for consciousness ==
There is a two-stage process for consciousness. The first is a large-capacity short-term memory, which was sometimes referred to as the Blickfield. The second is a narrow-capacity focus of selection attention, or apperception, under voluntary control. The second moves through the first. Wundt's main difference between his position and that of empiricists was that he emphasized the role of attention. When someone pays attention to elements, these elements can be arranged and rearranged according to that person's will. This is how things that have not actually been experienced, can result in the brain as if they had. Wundt believed that creative synthesis was entwined with all acts of apperception. It was believed by Wundt that this apperceptive process was important for normal cognitive functioning.

The creative synthesis principle was continually being expanded Factors regarding this are:

1. Mental states are dependent on the context in which they occur
2. They usually take the path of least resistance in their constructive acts
3. They fluctuate through opponent processes – this is called the principle of contrasts

== The principle of contrasts ==
The principle of contrasts is the idea that opposite experiences intensify one another. For example, a pleasant experience always seems more pleasant if it follows one that is interpreted as painful. A theory that is somewhat similar to this is the principle toward the development of opposites. This is the phenomena that occurs after a prolonged experience of one type, there becomes an increasing tendency to seek out the opposite experience

A major manifestation of creative synthesis is the concept of heterogony of ends. Heterogony of ends is the development of new motives during the series of events. There is an exchange of motives in our immediate experience and it defines the social behaviors that are engaged in as well as, the cognitive reaction to the world that occurs. An example of this would be going to the store with the intention of buying food and to come home to make dinner. But after getting to the store, you run into a friend that you have not seen in a long time, who you have missed. This adds a new set of motives to the pre-existing or original motives. There is almost always something that happens that changes a person's entire motivational pattern.
