= Unintended consequences =

Unforeseen outcomes of an action

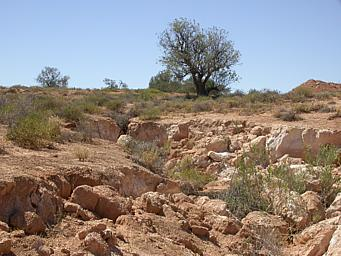
A gully erosion in Australia caused by rabbits, an unintended consequence of their introduction as game animals.

In the social sciences, unintended consequences (sometimes unanticipated consequences or unforeseen consequences, more colloquially called knock-on effects) are outcomes of a purposeful action that are not intended or foreseen. The term was popularized in the 20th century by the American sociologist Robert K. Merton.

Unintended consequences can be grouped into three types:

- Unexpected benefit: an unexpected benefit (also known as serendipity).
- Unexpected drawback: an unexpected detrimental effect, occurring in addition to the desired one. For example, while irrigation schemes may provide farmers with water for agriculture, they may also lead to a rise in the prevalence of waterborne diseases such as schistosomiasis.
- Perverse result: an effect contrary to what was originally intended. For example, while irrigation schemes intended to increase yields may improve water availability and increase agricultural yields in the short term, they might also lead to soil salination and the depletion of freshwater resources, decreasing yields in the long term.

== History ==
=== John Locke ===
The idea of unintended consequences dates back at least to John Locke who discussed the unintended consequences of interest rate regulation in his letter to Sir John Somers, Member of Parliament.

=== Adam Smith ===
The idea was also discussed by Adam Smith, the Scottish Enlightenment, and consequentialism (judging by results).

The invisible hand theorem is an example of the unintended consequences of agents acting in their self-interest. As Andrew S. Skinner puts it:

"The individual undertaker (entrepreneur), seeking the most efficient allocation of resources, contributes to overall economic efficiency; the merchant's reaction to price signals helps to ensure that the allocation of resources accurately reflects the structure of consumer preferences; and the drive to better our condition contributes to economic growth."

=== Marx and Engels ===
Influenced by 19th century positivism and Charles Darwin's evolution, for both Friedrich Engels and Karl Marx, the idea of uncertainty and chance in social dynamics (and thus unintended consequences beyond results of perfectly defined laws) was only apparent, (if not rejected) since social actions were directed and produced by deliberate human intention.

While discerning between the forces that generate changes in nature and those that generate changes in history in his discussion of Ludwig Feuerbach, Friedrich Engels touched on the idea of (apparent) unintended consequences:

In nature [...] there are only blind, unconscious agencies acting upon one another, [...] In the history of society, on the contrary, the actors are all endowed with consciousness, are men acting with deliberation or passion, working towards definite goals; nothing happens without a conscious purpose, without an intended aim. [...] For here, also, on the whole, in spite of the consciously desired aims of all individuals, accident apparently reigns on the surface. That which is willed happens but rarely; in the majority of instances the numerous desired ends cross and conflict with one another, or these ends themselves are from the outset incapable of realization, or the means of attaining them are insufficient. Thus the conflicts of innumerable individual wills and individual actions in the domain of history produce a state of affairs entirely analogous to [...] the realm of unconscious nature. The ends of the actions are intended, but the results which actually follow from these actions are not intended; or when they do seem to correspond to the end intended, they ultimately have consequences quite other than those intended. Historical events thus appear on the whole to be likewise governed by chance. But where on the surface accident holds sway, there actually it is always governed by inner, hidden laws, and it is only a matter of discovering these laws.

— Ludwig Feuerbach and the End of Classical German Philosophy (Ludwig Feuerbach und der Ausgang der klassischen deutschen Philosophie), 1886

For Karl Marx what can be understood as unintended consequences are actually consequences that should be expected but are obtained unconsciously. These consequences (that no one consciously sought) would be (in the same way as it is for Engels) product of conflicts that confront actions from countless individuals. The deviation between the original intended goal and the product derived from conflicts would be a marxist equivalent to «unintended consequences.»

This social conflicts would happen as a result of a competitive society, and also lead society to sabotage itself and prevent historical progress. Thus, historical progress (in Marxist terms) should eliminate these conflicts and make unintended consequences predictable.

=== Austrian School ===
Unintended consequences are a common topic of study and commentary for the Austrian school of economics given its emphasis on methodological individualism. This is to such an extent that unexpected consequences can be considered as a distinctive part of Austrian tenets.

==== Carl Menger ====
In "Principles of Economics", Austrian school founder Carl Menger (1840–1921) noted that the relationships that occur in the economy are so intricate that a change in the condition of a single good can have ramifications beyond that good. Menger wrote:

If it is established that the existence of human needs capable of satisfaction is a prerequisite of goods-character [...] This principle is valid whether the goods can be placed in direct causal connection with the satisfaction of human needs, or derive their goods-character from a more or less indirect causal connection with the satisfaction of human needs. [...]
Thus quinine would cease to be a good if the diseases it serves to cure should disappear, since the only need with the satisfaction of which it is causally connected would no longer exist. But the disappearance of the usefulness of quinine would have the further consequence that a large part of the corresponding goods of higher order would also be deprived of their goods-character. The inhabitants of quinine-producing countries, who currently earn their livings by cutting and peeling cinchona trees, would suddenly find that not only their stocks of cinchona bark, but also, in consequence, their cinchona trees, the tools and appliances applicable only to the production of quinine, and above all the specialized labor services, by means of which they previously earned their livings, would at once lose their goods-character, since all these things would, under the changed circumstances, no longer have any causal relationship with the satisfaction of human needs.

— Principles of Economics (Grundsätze der Volkswirtschaftslehre), 1871

==== Friedrich Hayek and Catallactics ====
Economist and philosopher Friedrich Hayek (1899–1992) is another key figure in the Austrian School of Economics who is notable for his comments on unintended consequences.

In "The Use of Knowledge in Society" (1945) Hayek argues that a centrally planned economy cannot reach the level of efficiency of the free market economy because the necessary (and pertinent) information for decision-making is not concentrated but dispersed among a vast number of agents. Then, for Hayek, the price system in the free market allows the members of a society to anonymously coordinate for the most efficient use of resources, for example, in a situation of scarcity of a raw material, the price increase would coordinate the actions of an uncountable amount of individuals "in the right direction".

The development of this system of interactions would allow the progress of society, and individuals would carry it out without knowing all its implications, given the dispersion (or lack of concentration) of information.

The implication of this is that the social order (which derives from social progress, which in turn derives from the economy), would be result of a spontaneous cooperation and also an unintended consequence, being born from a process of which no individual or group had all the information available or could know all possible outcomes.

In the Austrian school, this process of social adjustment that generates a social order in an unintendedly way is known as catallactics.

For Hayek and the Austrian School, the number of individuals involved in the process of creating a social order defines the type of unintended consequence:

1. If the process involves interactions and decision making of as many individuals (members of a society) as possible (thus gathering the greatest amount of knowledge dispersed among them), this process of "catallaxy" will lead to unexpected benefits (a social order and progress).
2. On the other hand, attempts by individuals or limited groups (who lack all the necessary information) to achieve a new or better order, will end in unexpected drawbacks.

=== Robert K. Merton ===
Sociologist Robert K. Merton popularised this concept in the twentieth century.

In "The Unanticipated Consequences of Purposive Social Action" (1936), Merton tried to apply a systematic analysis to the problem of unintended consequences of deliberate acts intended to cause social change. He emphasized that his term purposive action, "[was exclusively] concerned with 'conduct' as distinct from 'behavior.' That is, with action that involves motives and consequently a choice between various alternatives". Merton's usage included deviations from what Max Weber defined as rational social action: instrumentally rational and value rational. Merton also stated that "no blanket statement categorically affirming or denying the practical feasibility of all social planning is warranted."

=== Everyday usage ===
More recently, the law of unintended consequences has come to be used as an adage or idiomatic warning that an intervention in a complex system tends to create unanticipated and often undesirable outcomes.

Akin to Murphy's law, it is commonly used as a wry or humorous warning against the hubristic belief that humans can fully control the world around them, not to presuppose a belief in predestination or a lack or a disbelief in that of free will.

== Causes ==
Possible causes of unintended consequences include the world's inherent complexity (parts of a system responding to changes in the environment), perverse incentives, human stupidity, self-deception, failure to account for human nature, or other cognitive or emotional biases. As a sub-component of complexity (in the scientific sense), the chaotic nature of the universe—and especially its quality of having small, apparently insignificant changes with far-reaching effects (e.g., the butterfly effect)—applies.

In 1936, Robert K. Merton listed five possible causes of unanticipated consequences:

- Ignorance, making it impossible to anticipate everything, thereby leading to incomplete analysis.
- Errors in analysis of the problem or following habits that worked in the past but may not apply to the current situation.
- Immediate interests overriding long-term interests.
- Basic values which may require or prohibit certain actions even if the long-term result might be unfavourable (these long-term consequences may eventually cause changes in basic values).
- Self-defeating prophecy, or, the fear of some consequence which drives people to find solutions before the problem occurs, thus the non-occurrence of the problem is not anticipated.

In addition to Merton's causes, psychologist Stuart Vyse has noted that groupthink, described by Irving Janis, has been blamed for some decisions that result in unintended consequences.

== Types ==
=== Unexpected benefits ===
The creation of "no-man's lands" during the Cold War, in places such as the border between Eastern and Western Europe, and the Korean Demilitarized Zone, has led to large natural habitats.

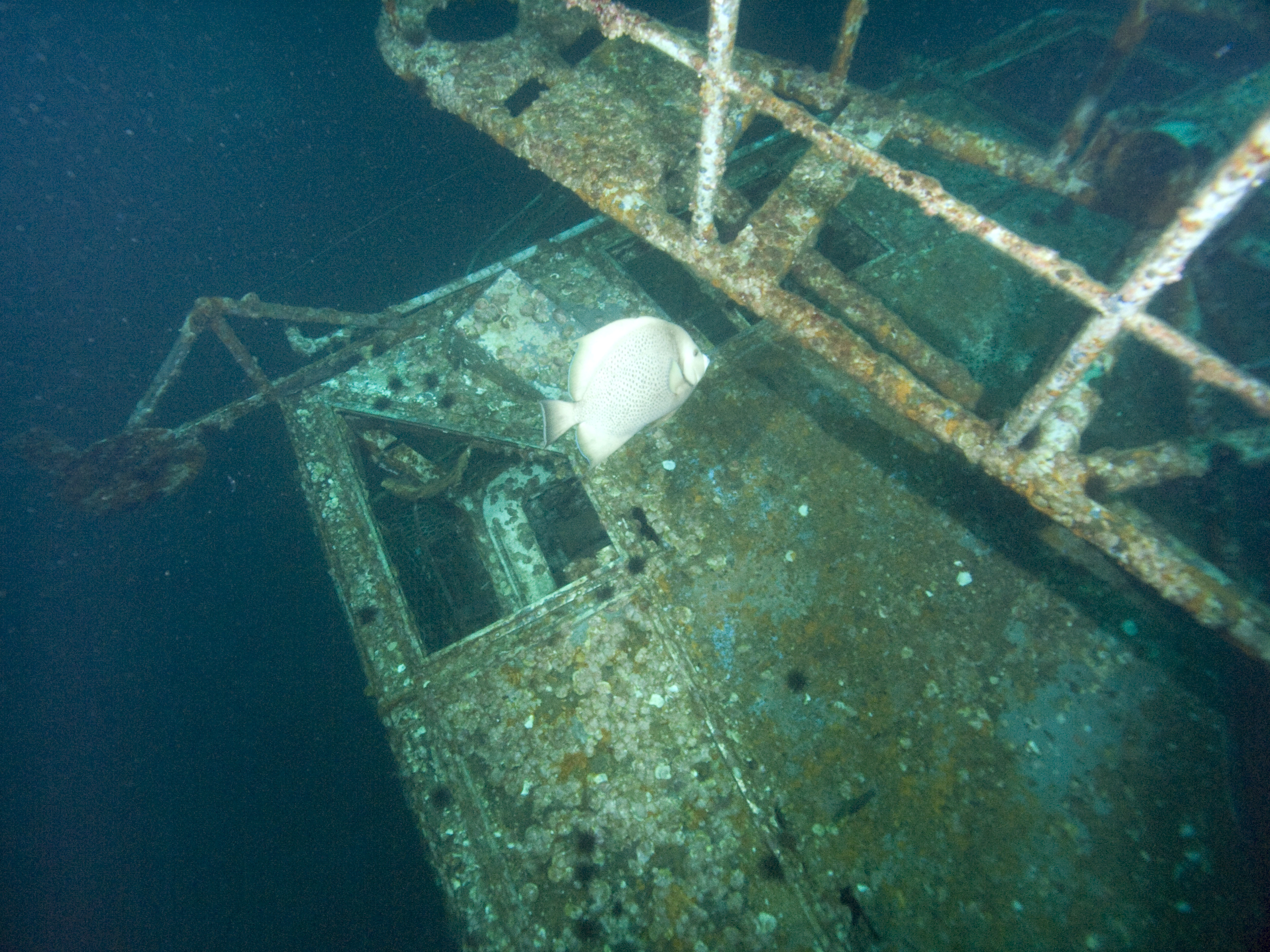
Sea life on the wreck of the sunken USS Oriskany.

The sinking of ships in shallow waters during wartime has created many artificial coral reefs, which can be scientifically valuable and have become an attraction for recreational divers. This led to the deliberate sinking of retired ships for the purpose of replacing coral reefs lost to global warming and other factors.

In medicine, most drugs have unintended consequences ('side effects') associated with their use. However, some are beneficial. For instance, aspirin, a pain reliever, is also an anticoagulant that can help prevent heart attacks and reduce the severity and damage from thrombotic strokes. Beneficial side effects have also lead to off-label use –prescription or use of a drug for an unlicensed purpose. Famously, the drug Viagra was developed to lower blood pressure, with its use for treating erectile dysfunction being discovered as a side effect in clinical trials.

In papal conclave journalism, Cardinal Fridolin Ambongo Besungu of Kinshasa in the Democratic Republic of Congo, the elected leader of all the bishops of Africa (including Madagascar), by early 2024 had come to be regarded as papabile for his adroit handling of the issue of blessing same sex unions, to which he is staunchly opposed.

=== Unexpected drawbacks ===
The implementation of a profanity filter by AOL in 1996 had the unintended consequence of blocking residents of Scunthorpe, North Lincolnshire, England, from creating accounts because of a false positive. The accidental censorship of innocent language, known as the Scunthorpe problem, has been repeated and widely documented.

In 1990, the Australian state of Victoria made safety helmets mandatory for all bicycle riders. While there was a reduction in the number of head injuries, there was also an unintended reduction in the number of juvenile cyclists—fewer cyclists obviously leads to fewer injuries, all else being equal. The risk of death and serious injury per cyclist seems to have increased, possibly because of risk compensation. Research by Vulcan et al. found that the reduction in juvenile cyclists was because the youths considered wearing a bicycle helmet unfashionable. A health-benefit model developed at Macquarie University in Sydney suggests that, while helmet use reduces "the risk of head or brain injury by approximately two-thirds or more", the decrease in exercise caused by reduced cycling as a result of helmet laws is counterproductive in terms of net health.

Prohibition in the 1920s United States, originally enacted to suppress the alcohol trade, drove many small-time alcohol suppliers out of business and consolidated the hold of large-scale organized crime over the illegal alcohol industry. Since alcohol was still popular, criminal organisations producing alcohol were well-funded and hence also increased their other activities. Similarly, the war on drugs, intended to suppress the illegal drug trade, instead increased the power and profitability of drug cartels who became the primary source of the products.

In CIA jargon, "blowback" describes the unintended, undesirable consequences of covert operations, such as the funding of the Afghan Mujahideen and the destabilization of Afghanistan contributing to the rise of the Taliban and Al-Qaeda.

The introduction of exotic animals and plants for food, for decorative purposes, or to control unwanted species often leads to more harm than good done by the introduced species.

- The introduction of rabbits in Australia and New Zealand for food was followed by an explosive growth in the rabbit population; rabbits have become a major feral pest in these countries.
- Cane toads, introduced into Australia to control canefield pests, were unsuccessful and have become a major pest in their own right.
- Kudzu, introduced to the US as an ornamental plant in 1876 and later used to prevent erosion in earthworks, has become a major problem in the Southeastern United States. Kudzu has displaced native plants and has effectively taken over significant portions of land.

The protection of the steel industry in the United States reduced production of steel in the United States, increased costs to users, and increased unemployment in associated industries.

There have been attempts to curb the consumption of sugary beverages by imposing a tax on them. However, a study found that the reduced consumption was only temporary. Also, there was an increase in the consumption of beer among households.

=== Perverse results ===
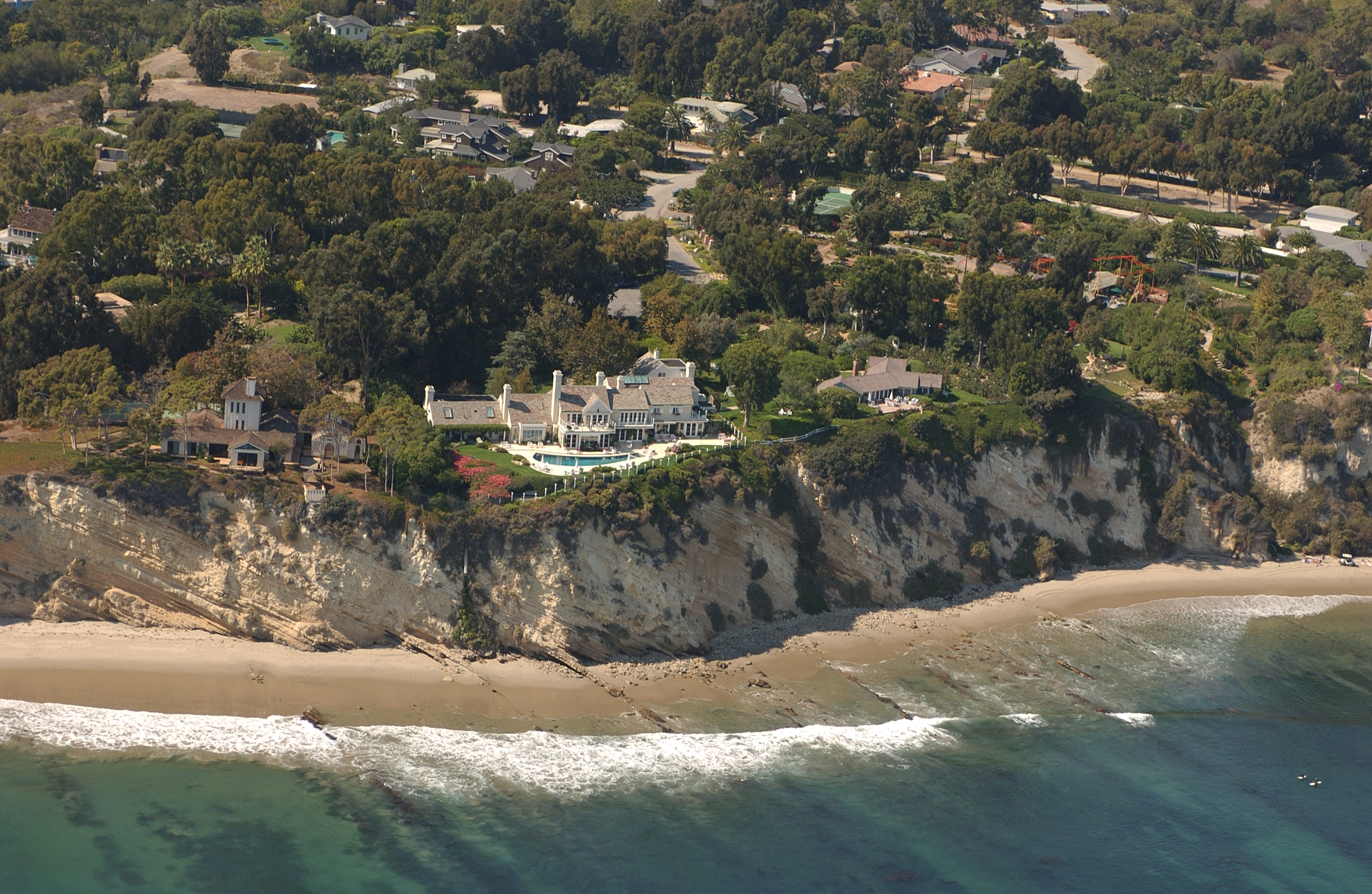
The infamous photo of the Streisand Estate.

In 2003, Barbra Streisand unsuccessfully sued Kenneth Adelman and Pictopia.com for posting a photograph of her home online. Before the lawsuit had been filed, only 6 people had downloaded the file, two of them Streisand's attorneys. The lawsuit drew attention to the image, resulting in 420,000 people visiting the site. The Streisand Effect was named after this incident, describing when an attempt to censor or remove a certain piece of information instead draws attention to the material being suppressed, resulting in the material instead becoming widely known, reported on, and distributed.

Passenger-side airbags in motorcars were intended as a safety feature, but led to an increase in child fatalities in the mid-1990s because small children were being hit by airbags that deployed automatically during collisions. The supposed solution to this problem, moving the child seat to the back of the vehicle, led to an increase in the number of children forgotten in unattended vehicles, some of whom died under extreme temperature conditions.

It was thought that adding south-facing conservatories to British houses would reduce energy consumption by providing extra insulation and warmth from the sun. However, people tended to use the conservatories as living areas, installing heating and ultimately increasing overall energy consumption.

The New Jersey Childproof Handgun Law, which was intended to protect children from accidental discharge of firearms by forcing all future firearms sold in New Jersey to contain "smart" safety features, has delayed, if not stopped entirely, the introduction of such firearms to New Jersey markets. The wording of the law caused significant public backlash, fuelled by gun rights lobbyists, and several shop owners offering such guns received death threats and stopped stocking them. In 2014, 12 years after the law was passed, it was suggested the law be repealed if gun rights lobbyists agree not to resist the introduction of "smart" firearms.

Televised drug prevention advertisements may lead to increased drug use.

The passage of the Stop Enabling Sex Traffickers Act has led to a reported increase in risky behaviors by sex workers as a result of quashing their ability to seek and screen clients online, forcing them back onto the streets or into the dark web. The ads posted were previously an avenue for advocates to reach out to those wanting to escape the trade.

After Dobbs v. Jackson Women's Health Organization (2022) overturned Roe v. Wade (1973), the number of abortions in the United States increased and the number of births fell, due to the right to travel between states.

==== Perverse incentives ====
According to an anecdote, the British government, concerned about the number of venomous cobra snakes in Delhi, offered a bounty for every dead cobra. This was a successful strategy as large numbers of snakes were killed for the reward. Eventually, enterprising people began breeding cobras for the income. When the government became aware of this, they scrapped the reward program, causing the cobra breeders to set the now-worthless snakes free. As a result, the wild cobra population further increased. The apparent solution for the problem made the situation even worse, becoming known as the Cobra effect.

Theobald Mathew's temperance campaign in 19th-century Ireland resulted in thousands of people vowing never to drink alcohol again. This led to the consumption of diethyl ether, a much more dangerous intoxicant—owing to its high flammability—by those seeking to become intoxicated without breaking the letter of their pledge.

A reward for lost nets found along the Normandy coast was offered by the French government between 1980 and 1981. This resulted in people vandalizing nets to collect the reward.

Beginning in the 1940s and continuing into the 1960s, the Canadian federal government gave Quebec $2.75 per day per psychiatric patient for their cost of care, but only $1.25 a day per orphan. The perverse result is that the orphan children were diagnosed as mentally ill so Quebec could receive the larger amount of money. This psychiatric misdiagnosis affected up to 20,000 people, and the children are known as the Duplessis Orphans in reference to the Premier of Quebec who oversaw the scheme, Maurice Duplessis.

Drug prohibition can lead drug traffickers to prefer stronger, more dangerous substances, that can be more easily smuggled and distributed than other, less concentrated substances.

===== Risk compensation =====
Risk compensation, or the Peltzman effect, occurs after implementation of safety measures intended to reduce injury or death (e.g. bike helmets, seatbelts, etc.). People may feel safer than they really are and take additional risks which they would not have taken without the safety measures in place. This may result in no change, or even an increase, in morbidity or mortality, rather than a decrease as intended.

The use of precision guided munitions meant to reduce the rate of civilian casualties encouraged armies to narrow their safety margins, and increase the use of deadly force in densely populated areas. This in turn increased the danger to uninvolved civilians, who in the past would have been out of the line of fire because of armies' aversion of using higher-risk weaponry in densely populated areas. The perceived ability to operate precision weaponry from afar (where in the past heavy munitions or troop deployment would have been needed) also led to the expansion of the list of potential targets. As put by Michael Walzer: "Drones not only make it possible for us to get at our enemies, they may also lead us to broaden the list of enemies, to include presumptively hostile individuals and militant organizations simply because we can get at them—even if they aren't actually involved in attacks against us." This idea is also echoed by Grégoire Chamayou: "In a situation of moral hazard, military action is very likely to be deemed 'necessary' simply because it is possible, and possible at a lower cost."

=== Other ===
According to Lynn White, the invention of the horse stirrup enabled new patterns of warfare that eventually led to the development of feudalism (see Stirrup Thesis).

Increasing usage of search engines, also including recent image search features, has contributed in the ease of which media is consumed. Some abnormalities in usage may have shifted preferences for pornographic film actors, as the producers began using common search queries or tags to label the actors in new roles.

== Perverse consequences of environmental intervention ==
Almost all environmental problems, from chemical pollution to global warming, are the unexpected consequences of the application of modern technologies. Traffic congestion, deaths and injuries from car accidents, air pollution, and global warming are unintended consequences of the invention and large scale adoption of the automobile. Hospital infections are the unexpected side-effect of antibiotic resistance, and even human population growth leading to environmental degradation is the side effect of various technological (i.e., agricultural and industrial) revolutions.

Because of the complexity of ecosystems, deliberate changes to an ecosystem or other environmental interventions will often have (usually negative) unintended consequences. Sometimes, these effects cause permanent irreversible changes. Examples include:

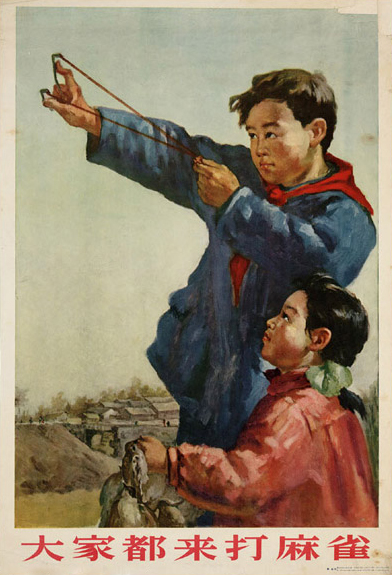
Chinese poster encouraging children to attack sparrows.

- During the Four Pests campaign, Maoist China ordered the killing of sparrows, as well as rats, flies, and mosquitoes. The campaign was successful in reducing the sparrow population; however, in their absence, locust populations previously kept in check by sparrow predation grew out of control and came to infest crops. Rice yields were substantially decreased; the campaign was one of the causes of the Great Chinese Famine.
- During the Great Plague of London a killing of dogs and cats was ordered. If left untouched, they would have made a significant reduction in the rat population that carried the fleas which transmitted the disease.
- The installation of smokestacks to decrease pollution in local areas, resulting in spread of pollution at a higher altitude, and acid rain on an international scale.
- After about 1900, public demand led the US government to fight forest fires in the American West, and set aside land as national forests and parks to protect them from fires. This policy led to fewer fires, but also led to growth conditions such that, when fires did occur, they were much larger and more damaging. Modern research suggests that this policy was misguided, and that a certain level of wildfires is a natural and important part of forest ecology.
- Side effects of climate engineering to counter global warming could involve even further warming as a consequence of reflectivity-reducing afforestation or crop yield reductions and rebound effects after solar dimming measures with even more accelerated warming.

== See also ==
- Boomerang effect (psychology) – Unintended effect of persuasion
- Collateral damage – Unintended consequences done to third parties
- Domino effect – Cumulative effect produced when one event sets off a chain of other events
- Dutch disease – Theory in economics
- Heterogony of ends
- Ethics in mathematics – Emerging field of applied ethics
- Externality – Imposed cost or benefit in economics
- Instrumental and value-rational action – Philosophical terms
- Knightian uncertainty – Lack of quantifiable knowledge in economics
- Map–territory relation – Relationship between an object and a representation of that object
- Moral hazard – Increases in the exposure to risk when insured, or when another bears the cost
- Parable of the broken window – Parable by French economist Frédéric Bastiat
- Rebound effect – Pharmacological term
- Rebound effect (conservation) – Increase in consumption following energy or resource savings
- Paradoxical reaction – Effect of drug opposite to expectation
- Parkinson's law – Adage that work expands to fill its available time
- Streisand effect – Increased awareness of information after suppression efforts
- System accident – Unanticipated interaction of multiple failures in a complex system
- Systemantics – Book by John Gall
- Technology assessment – Determining the value of a new technology
- The Rhetoric of Reaction – 1991 book by Albert O. Hirschman (appearing as the "perversity thesis")
- Tragedy of the commons – Overuse of a shared resource
- Virtuous circle and vicious circle – Self-reinforcing sequence of events

== Bibliography ==
- O'Driscoll Jr., Gerald (2004). "The Puzzle of Hayek". The Independent Review. 9 (2). Independent Institute: 271–281. JSTOR 24562706.
- Menger, Carl (2007) [20 July 1871]. "I. The General Theory of the Good". Principles of Economics (PDF). Translated by Dingwall, James; Hoselitz, Bert F. Auburn, Alabama: Mises Institute. ISBN 978-1-61016-202-9. OCLC 271580456.
- Hayek, Friedrich (May 1, 1996) [1945]. "The Use of Knowledge in Society". Foundation for Economic Education.
- Vernon, Richard (February 1979). "Unintended Consequences". Political Theory. 7 (1). Newbury Park, California: SAGE Publishing: 57–73. doi:10.1177/009059177900700104. JSTOR 190824.
- Engels, Friedrich (1946) [1886]. "Part 4: Marx". Ludwig Feuerbach and the End of Classical German Philosophy. Progress Publishers. ISBN 978-1-4102-2345-6. OCLC 45655872 – via Marxists Internet Archive.
- Saint-Upéry, Marc [in French] (March–April 2015). Cucchi, Silvina; Grieco, Florencia (eds.). "Tres derroteros del marxismo: pseudociencia, historia, ontología" [Three paths of Marxism: pseudoscience, history, ontology] (PDF). Nueva Sociedad (in Spanish) (256). Buenos Aires: 145–163. ISSN 0251-3552.
- The Unanticipated Consequences of Purposive Social Action by Robert K. Merton, American Sociological Review, Vol 1 Issue 6, Dec 1936, pp. 894–904.
- Unintended Consequences entry in Concise Encyclopedia of Economics
- Unintended Consequences of Green Technologies
- Mica Adriana, Peisert Arkadiusz, Winczorek Jan (eds), (2011), Sociology and the Unintended. Robert Merton Revisited, Peter Lang, Frankfurt am Main.
- Huesemann, Michael H., and Joyce A. Huesemann (2011). Technofix: Why Technology Won't Save Us or the Environment, Chapter 1, "The Inherent Unavoidability and Unpredictability of Unintended Consequences", Chapter 2, "Some Unintended Consequences of Modern Technology", and Chapter 4, "In Search of Solutions I: Counter-Technologies and Social Fixes", New Society Publishers, Gabriola Island, British Columbia, Canada, ISBN 0-86571-704-4, 464 pp.
- Edward Tenner, Why Things Bite Back: Technology and the Revenge of Unintended Consequences, Vintage Books, 1997.
- Tomislav V. Kovandzic, John Sloan III, and Lynne M. Vieraitis. Unintended Consequences of Politically Popular Sentencing Policy: The Homicide-Promoting Effects of 'Three Strikes' in U.S. Cities (1980–1999). Criminology & Public Policy Vol 1, Issue 3, July 2002.
- Vulcan, A.P., Cameron, M.H. & Heiman, L., "Evaluation of mandatory bicycle helmet use in Victoria, Australia", 36th Annual Conference Proceedings, Association for the Advancement of Automotive Medicine, October 5–7, 1992.
- Vulcan, A.P., Cameron, M.H. & Watson, W.L., "Mandatory Bicycle Helmet Use: Experience in Victoria, Australia", World Journal of Surgery, Vol. 16, No. 3, (May/June 1992), pp. 389–397.
- "Hidden Costs of Energy: Unpriced Consequences of Energy Production and Use"
