= Rudolf Eisler =

Austrian philosopher (1873–1926)

- Born: 7 January 1873; Vienna
- Died: 14 December 1926 (aged 53); Vienna
- Spouse: Ida Maria Fischer

Education
- Education: Leipzig University

Philosophical work
- Era: 20th century philosophy
- Region: Western Philosophy
- School: Objective phenomenalism
- Main interests: Philosophy of mind
- Notable ideas: Objective phenomenalism

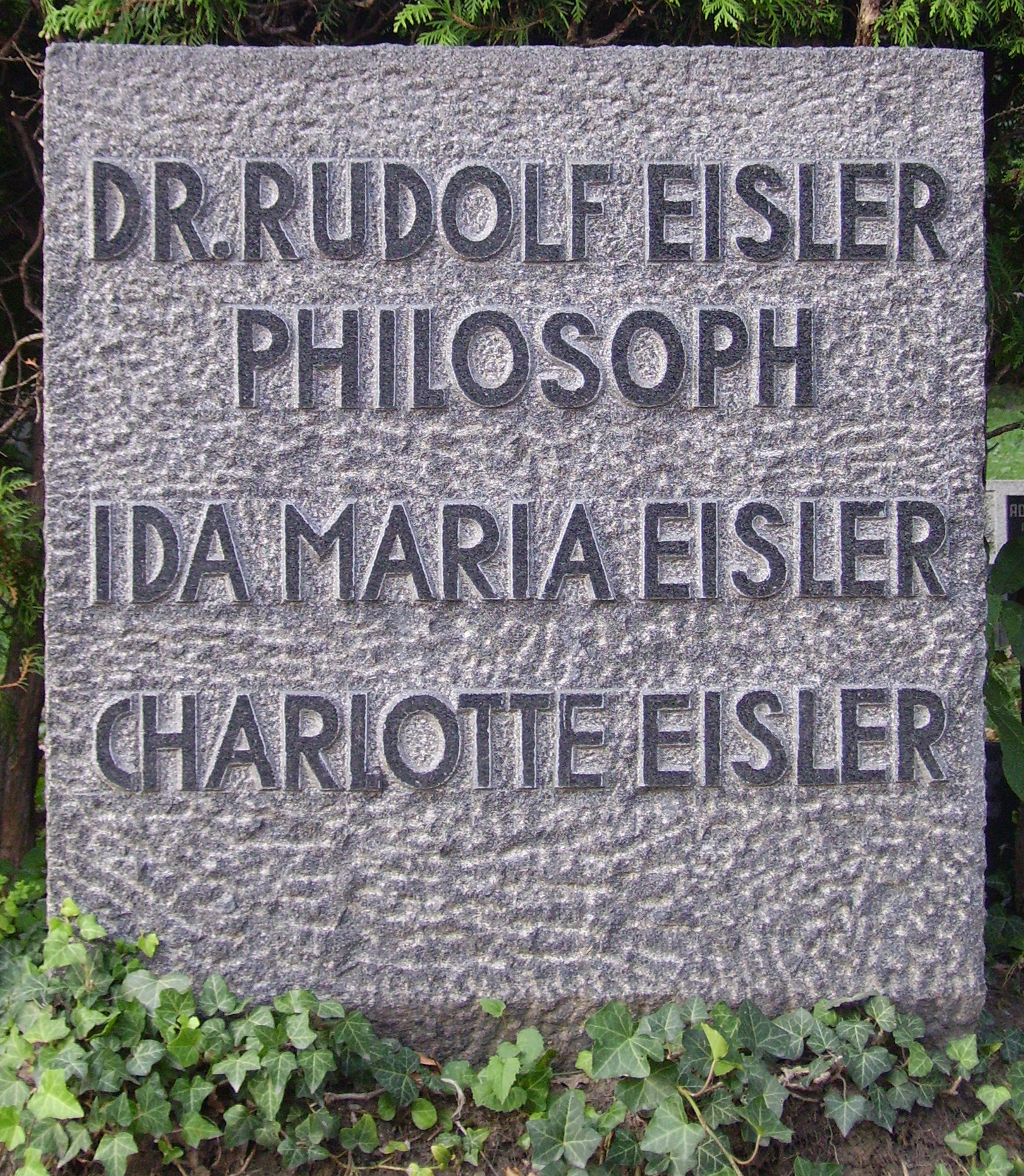
Grave of Rudolf Eisler

Rudolf Eisler (7 January 1873 – 14 December 1926) was an Austrian philosopher.

== Biography ==
Rudolf Eisler was born in Vienna to a family of wealthy Jewish merchants.

As a student of Wilhelm Wundt, Rudolf Eisler studied philosophy at Leipzig University and earned his Ph.D. there. In addition to Immanuel Kant, his philosophical writings, particularly those concerning phenomenalism, were largely influenced by Wundt, as well as Hermann Cohen and Edmund Husserl.

Upon moving back to Vienna in 1901, he and his family settled in the "Matzos Quarter," a section of the city largely composed of working-class Jews. Due to his atheism, he was denied a teaching position at the University of Vienna. He found work as an editor for a series of books on philosophy and sociology for the publisher Werner Klinkhardt. His Grundlagen der Philosophie des Geisteslebens (Foundations of the Philosophy of the Spiritual Life, 1908) was an installment of that series. In 1907, along with the Marxist Max Adler, he founded the Vienna Sociological Society.

Eisler described his philosophical ideas as "objective phenomenalism," which he articulated as a combination of empirical realism and transcendental idealism. With a firm understanding of the writings of Kant, his musings generally concerned the origins and construction of reality and truth. In his later years, he developed an interest in syncretism and his writings turned to problems of cognition.

His philosophical leanings were a great influence on the early education and political identities of his children and grandchildren.

=== Marriage and children ===
Ida Maria Fischer, the daughter of a Lutheran butcher, lived with Rudolf Eisler during his studies in Leipzig. She herself was an "irregular" student at the University of Leipzig. She became known locally as a journalist and poet. They were married and had three children:

- Ruth Fischer (11 December 1895 – 13 March 1961): politician and co-founder of the Austrian Communist Party
- Gerhart Eisler (20 February 1897 – 21 March 1968): politician and prominent member of the Communist Party of Germany
- Hanns Eisler (6 July 1898 – 6 September 1962): composer of the national anthem of East Germany

Rudolf Eisler was cremated at Feuerhalle Simmering, where also his ashes are buried.

== Published works ==
- Wörterbuch der philosophichen Begriffe und Ausdrücke, 3 volumes (Dictionary of Philosophical Terms and Expressions, 1899, 1927, 1930).
- Nietzsche's Erkenntnistheorie und Metaphysik. Darstellung und Kritik (Nietzsche's Theory of Cognition and Metaphysics: Explanation and Criticism, 1902).
- Wilhelm Wundts Philosophie und Psychologie. In ihren Grundlehren dargestellt (Wilhelm Wundt's Philosophy and Psychology: An Outline of Its Basic Teachings, 1902).
- Leib und Seele. Darstellung und Kritik der neueren Theorien des Verhältnisses zwischen physischem und psychischem Dasein (Body and Soul: Explanation and Criticism of New Theories of Relationships Between Physical and Psychic Being, 1906).
- Einführung in die Erkenntnistheorie (Introduction to Cognition Theory, 1907).
- Geschichte des Monismus (History of Monism, 1910).
- Grundlagen der Philosophie des Geisteslebens (Foundations of the Philosophy of the Spiritual Life, 1908).
- Philosophen-Lexikon: Leben, Werke, und Lehren der Denker (Philosopher Lexikon: Life, Works, and Lessons of Thinkers, 1912).
- Kant-Lexicon: Nachschlagewerke zu Kants sämtlichen Schriften, Briefen, und handschriftlichem Nachlass (Kant Lexicon: A Reference of Kant's Collected Writings, Letters, and Handwritten Accounts, 1930).
- Allgemeine Kulturgeschichte (Leipzig: Weber Verlag 1905)
