= Gourgen Edilyan =

Armenian psychologist and student of Wilhelm Wundt

Gourgen Edilyan (Arm.: Գուրգեն Էդիլյան) (25 December 1885 – 18 January 1942) was an Armenian psychologist, a student of Wilhelm Wundt and the first dean of the Armenian Pedagogical Institute.
