= Wilhelm Wundt =

German founder of psychology (1832–1920)

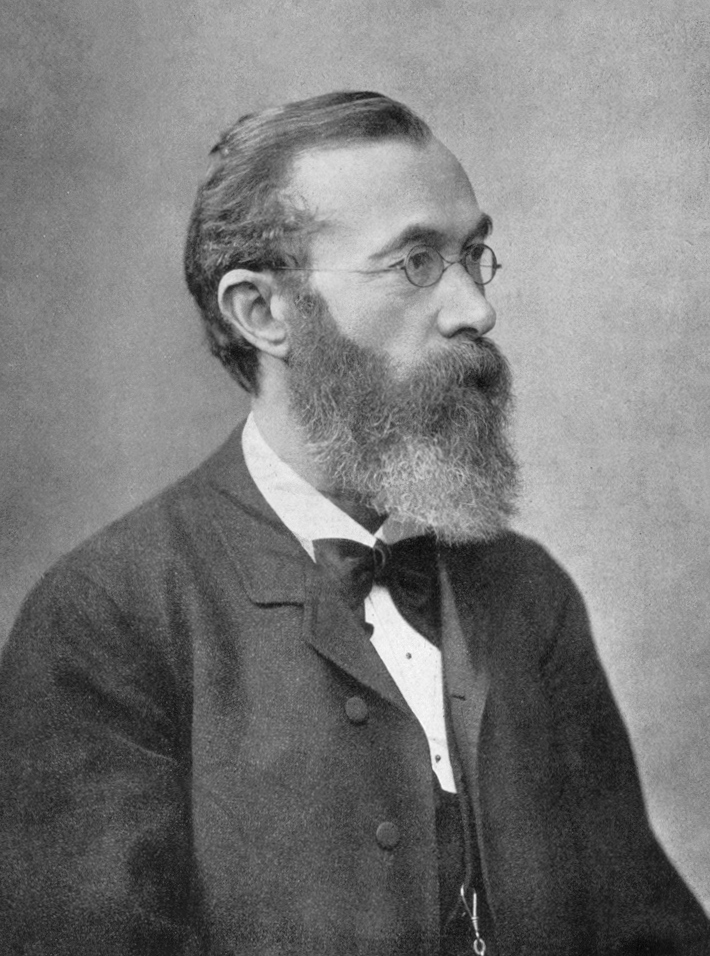
- Wundt in 1902
- Born: Wilhelm Maximilian Wundt; 16 August 1832; Neckarau near Mannheim, Grand Duchy of Baden, German Confederation
- Died: 31 August 1920 (aged 88); Großbothen, Saxony, Germany
- Education: University of Heidelberg (MD, 1856)
- Known for: Experimental psychology Cultural psychology Apperception
- Scientific career
- Fields: Experimental psychology, Cultural psychology, philosophy, physiology
- Workplaces: University of Leipzig
- Thesis: Untersuchungen über das Verhalten der Nerven in entzündeten und degenerierten Organen (Research of the Behaviour of Nerves in Inflamed and Degenerated Organs) (1856)
- Doctoral advisor: Karl Ewald Hasse
- Other academic advisors: Hermann von Helmholtz; Johannes Peter Müller
- Doctoral students: James McKeen Cattell, G. Stanley Hall, Oswald Külpe, Hugo Münsterberg, Ljubomir Nedić, Walter Dill Scott, George M. Stratton, Edward B. Titchener, Lightner Witmer
- Other notable students: Nikolay Lossky; Tomáš Masaryk

Wilhelm Maximilian Wundt (/wʊnt/; German: [vʊnt]; 16 August 1832 – 31 August 1920) was a German physiologist, philosopher, professor, and one of the fathers of modern psychology. Wundt, who distinguished psychology as a science from philosophy and biology, was the first person to call himself a psychologist.

He is widely regarded as the "father of experimental psychology". In 1879, at the University of Leipzig, Wundt founded the first formal laboratory for psychological research. This marked psychology as an independent field of study.

He also established the first academic journal for psychological research, Philosophische Studien (from 1883 to 1903), followed by Psychologische Studien (from 1905 to 1917), to publish the institute's research.

A survey published in American Psychologist in 1991 ranked Wundt's reputation as first for "all-time eminence", based on ratings provided by 31 American historians of psychology. William James and Sigmund Freud were ranked a distant second and third.

== Biography ==
=== Early life ===
Wundt was born at Neckarau, Baden (now part of Mannheim) on 16 August 1832, the fourth child to parents Maximilian Wundt (1787–1846), a Lutheran minister, and Marie Frederike, née Arnold (1797–1868). Two of Wundt's siblings died in childhood; his brother, Ludwig, survived. Wundt's paternal grandfather was Friedrich Peter Wundt (1742–1805), professor of geography and pastor in Wieblingen. When Wundt was about six years of age, his family moved to Heidelsheim, then a small medieval town in Baden-Württemberg.

Born in the German Confederation at a time that was considered very economically stable, Wundt grew up during a period in which the reinvestment of wealth into educational, medical and technological development was commonplace. An economic striving for the advancement of knowledge catalyzed the development of a new psychological study method, and facilitated his development into the prominent psychological figure he is today.

=== Education and Heidelberg career ===
Wundt studied from 1851 to 1856 at the University of Tübingen, at the University of Heidelberg, and at the University of Berlin. After graduating as a doctor of medicine from Heidelberg (1856), with doctoral advisor Karl Ewald Hasse, Wundt studied briefly with Johannes Peter Müller and Emil du Bois-Reymond before joining the staff of Heidelberg University, becoming an assistant to the physicist and physiologist Hermann von Helmholtz in 1858 with responsibility for teaching the laboratory course in physiology. There he wrote Contributions to the Theory of Sense Perception (1858–1862). In 1864, he became associate professor for anthropology and medical psychology and published a textbook about human physiology. However, his main interest, according to his lectures and classes, was not in the medical field – he was more attracted by psychology and related subjects. His lectures on psychology were published as Lectures on Human and Animal Psychology in 1863–1864. Wundt applied himself to writing a work that came to be one of the most important in the history of psychology, Principles of Physiological Psychology, in 1874. This was the first textbook that was written pertaining to the field of experimental psychology.

=== Marriage and family ===
In 1867, near Heidelberg, Wundt met Sophie Mau (1844–1912). She was the eldest daughter of the Kiel theology professor Heinrich August Mau and his wife Louise, née von Rumohr, and a sister of the archaeologist August Mau. They married on 14 August 1872 in Kiel. The couple had three children: Eleanor (1876–1957), who became an assistant to her father in many ways, Louise, called Lilli, (1880–1884) and Max Wundt (1879–1963), who became a philosophy professor.

=== Career in Zurich and Leipzig ===
In 1875, Wundt was promoted to professor of "Inductive Philosophy" in Zurich, and in 1875, Wundt was made professor of philosophy at the University of Leipzig where Ernst Heinrich Weber and Gustav Theodor Fechner had initiated research on sensory psychology and psychophysics – and where two centuries earlier Gottfried Wilhelm Leibniz had developed his philosophy and theoretical psychology, which strongly influenced Wundt's intellectual path. Wundt's admiration for Ernst Heinrich Weber was clear from his memoirs, where he proclaimed that Weber should be regarded as the father of experimental psychology: "I would rather call Weber the father of experimental psychology…It was Weber's great contribution to think of measuring psychic quantities and of showing the exact relationships between them, to be the first to understand this and carry it out."

=== Laboratory of Experimental Psychology ===
In 1879, at the University of Leipzig, Wundt opened the first laboratory ever to be exclusively devoted to psychological studies, and this event marked the official birth of psychology as an independent field of study. The new lab was full of graduate students carrying out research on topics assigned by Wundt, and it soon attracted young scholars from all over the world who were eager to learn about the new science that Wundt had developed.

The University of Leipzig assigned Wundt a lab in 1876 to store equipment he had brought from Zurich. Located in the Konvikt building, many of Wundt's demonstrations took place in this laboratory due to the inconvenience of transporting his equipment between the lab and his classroom. Wundt arranged for the construction of suitable instruments and collected many pieces of equipment such as tachistoscopes, chronoscopes, pendulums, electrical devices, timers, and sensory mapping devices, and was known to assign an instrument to various graduate students with the task of developing uses for future research in experimentation. Between 1885 and 1909, there were 15 assistants.

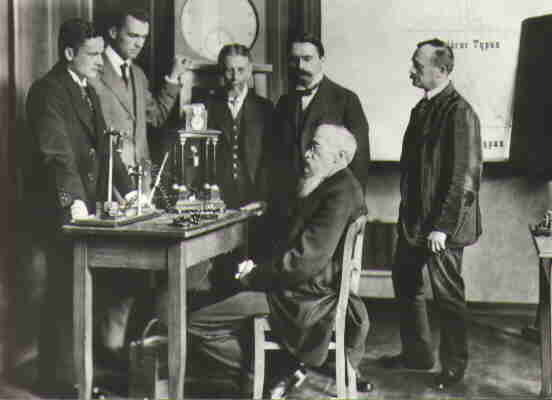
Wilhelm Wundt (seated) with colleagues in his psychological laboratory, the first of its kind

In 1879, Wundt began conducting experiments that were not part of his course work, and he claimed that these independent experiments solidified his lab's legitimacy as a formal laboratory of psychology, though the university did not officially recognize the building as part of the campus until 1883. The laboratory grew and encompassed a total of eleven rooms. The Psychological Institute, as it became known, eventually moved to a new building that Wundt had designed specifically for psychological research.

=== Wundt's teaching in the Institute for Experimental Psychology ===
The list of Wundt's lectures during the winter terms of 1875–1879 shows a wide-ranging programme, 6 days a week, on average 2 hours daily, e.g. in the winter term of 1875: Psychology of language, Anthropology, Logic and Epistemology; and during the subsequent summer term: Psychology, Brain and Nerves, as well as Physiology. Cosmology, Historical and General Philosophy were included in the following terms.

=== Wundt's doctoral students ===
Wundt was responsible for an extraordinary number of doctoral dissertations between 1875 and 1919: 185 students including 70 foreigners (of whom 23 were from Russia, Poland, and other east-European countries and 18 were from America). Several of Wundt's students became eminent psychologists in their own right. They include the Germans Oswald Külpe (a professor at the University of Würzburg), Ernst Meumann (a professor in Leipzig and in Hamburg and a pioneer in pedagogical psychology), Hugo Münsterberg (a professor in Freiburg and at Harvard University, a pioneer in applied psychology), and cultural psychologist Willy Hellpach, and the Armenian Gourgen Edilyan.

The Americans listed include James McKeen Cattell (the first professor of psychology in the United States), Granville Stanley Hall (the father of the child psychology movement and adolescent developmental theorist, head of Clark University), Charles Hubbard Judd (Director of the School of Education at the University of Chicago), Walter Dill Scott (who contributed to the development of industrial psychology and taught at Harvard University), Edward Bradford Titchener, Lightner Witmer (founder of the first psychological clinic in his country), Frank Angell, Edward Wheeler Scripture, James Mark Baldwin (one of the founders of Princeton's Department of Psychology and who made important contributions to early psychology, psychiatry, and to the theory of evolution).

Wundt, thus, is present in the academic "family tree" of the majority of American psychologists, first and second generation. – Worth mentioning are the Englishman Charles Spearman; the Romanian Constantin Rădulescu-Motru (Personalist philosopher and head of the Philosophy department at the university of Bucharest), Hugo Eckener, the manager of the Luftschiffbau Zeppelin – not to mention those students who became philosophers (like Rudolf Eisler or the Serbian Ljubomir Nedić). – Students (or visitors) who were later to become well known included Vladimir Mikhailovich Bekhterev (Bechterev), Franz Boas, Émile Durkheim, Edmund Husserl, Bronisław Malinowski, George Herbert Mead, Edward Sapir, Ferdinand Tönnies, Benjamin Lee Whorf.

Much of Wundt's work was derided mid-century in the United States because of a lack of adequate translations, misrepresentations by certain students, and behaviorism's polemic with Wundt's program.

=== Retirement and death ===
Wundt retired in 1917 to devote himself to his scientific writing. According to Wirth (1920), over the summer of 1920, Wundt "felt his vitality waning ... and soon after his eighty-eighth birthday, he died ... a gentle death on the afternoon of Tuesday, August 3" (p. 1). Wundt is buried in Leipzig's South Cemetery with his wife, Sophie, and their daughters, Lilli and Eleanor.

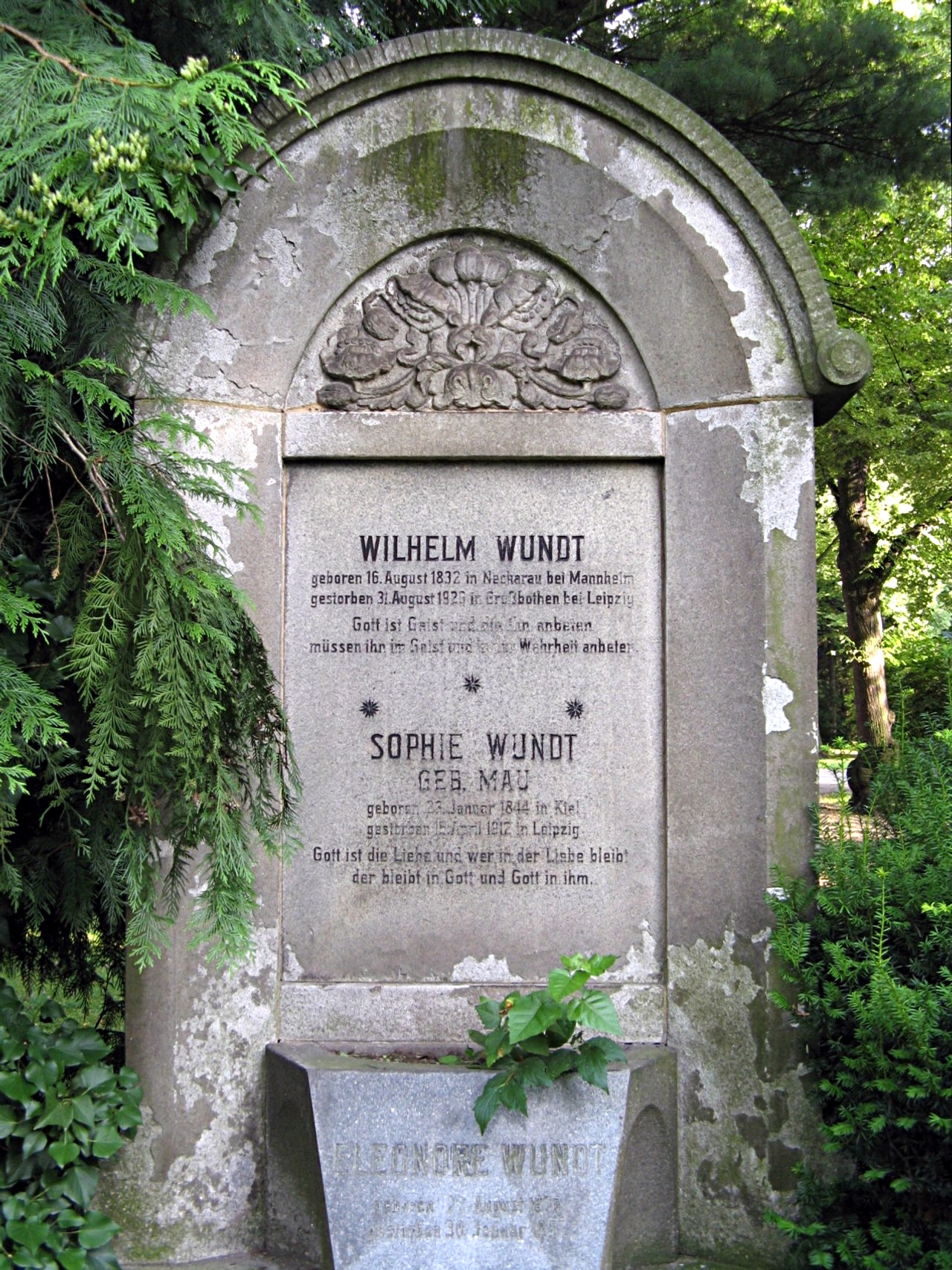
Wundt's gravestone (Note: The main part of the inscription is: WILHELM WUNDT geboren 16. August 1832 in Neckarau bei Mannheim gestorben 31. August 1920 in Großbothen bei Leipzig Gott ist Geist und die ihn anbeten müssen ihn im Geist und in der Wahrheit anbeten. SOPHIE WUNDT GEB[oren], MAU geboren 23. Januar 1844 in Kiel gestorben 15. April 1914 in Leipzig Gott ist die Liebe und wer in Liebe bleibt der bleibt in Gott und Gott in ihm. A translation is: WILHELM WUNDT born 16 August 1832 in Neckarau in Mannheim[,] died 31 August 1920 in Großbothen in Leipzig[.] God is Spirit and they that worship him must worship him in spirit and in truth. SOPHIE Wundt NÉE, MAU born 23 January 18, 1844 in Kiel[,] died 15 April 1914 in Leipzig[.] God is love and who abides in love abides in God and God in him.)

== Awards and honors ==
Wundt was awarded honorary doctorates from the Universities of Leipzig and Göttingen, and the Pour le Mérite for Science and Arts. He was nominated three times for the Nobel Prize in Physiology or Medicine.

Wundt was an honorary member of 12 scientific organizations or societies. He was a corresponding member of 13 academies in Germany and abroad. For example, he was elected an International Member of the American Philosophical Society in 1895 and of the United States National Academy of Sciences in 1909.

Wundt's name was given to the Asteroid Vundtia (635).

== Overview of Wundt's work ==
Wundt was initially a physician and a well-known neurophysiologist before turning to sensory physiology and psychophysics. He was convinced that, for example, the process of spatial perception could not solely be explained on a physiological level, but also involved psychological principles. Wundt founded experimental psychology as a discipline and became a pioneer of cultural psychology. He created a broad research programme in empirical psychology and developed a system of philosophy and ethics from the basic concepts of his psychology – bringing together several disciplines in one person.

Wundt's epistemological position – against John Locke and English empiricism (sensualism) – was made clear in his book Beiträge zur Theorie der Sinneswahrnehmung (Contributions on the Theory of Sensory Perception) published in 1862, by his use of a quotation from Gottfried Wilhelm Leibniz on the title page:

"Nihil est in intellectu quod non fuerit in sensu, nisi intellectu ipse." (Leibniz, Nouveaux essais, 1765, Livre II, Des Idées, Chapitre 1, § 6). – Nothing is in the intellect that was not first in the senses, except the intellect itself.

Principles that are not present in sensory impressions can be recognised in human perception and consciousness: logical inferences, categories of thought, the principle of causality, the principle of purpose (teleology), the principle of emergence and other epistemological principles.

Wundt's most important books are:

- Lehrbuch der Physiologie des Menschen (Textbook of Human Physiology) (1864/1865, 4th ed. 1878);
- Grundzüge der physiologischen Psychologie (Principles of Physiological Psychology), (1874; 6th ed. 1908–1911, 3 Vols.);
- System der Philosophie (System of Philosophy), (1889; 4th ed. 1919, 2 Vols.);
- Logik. Eine Untersuchung der Prinzipien der Erkenntnis und der Methoden wissenschaftlicher Forschung (Logic. An investigation into the principles of knowledge and the methods of scientific research), (1880–1883; 4th ed. 1919–1921, 3 Vols.);
- Ethik (Ethics), (1886; 3rd ed. 1903, 2 Vols.);
- Völkerpsychologie. Eine Untersuchung der Entwicklungsgesetze von Sprache, Mythos und Sitte (Cultural Psychology. An investigation into developmental laws of language, myth, and conduct), (1900–1920, 10 Vols.);
- Grundriss der Psychologie (Outline of Psychology), (1896; 14th ed. 1920).

These 22 volumes cover an immense variety of topics. On examination of the complete works, however, a close relationship between Wundt's theoretical psychology, epistemology and methodology can be seen. English translations are only available for the best-known works: Principles of physiological Psychology (only the single-volume 1st ed. of 1874) and Ethics (also only 1st ed. of 1886). Wundt's work remains largely inaccessible without advanced knowledge of German. Its reception, therefore, is still greatly hampered by misunderstandings, stereotypes and superficial judgements.

== Central themes in Wundt's work ==
=== Memory ===
Wilhelm Wundt conducted experiments on memory, which would be considered today as iconic memory, short-term memory, and enactment and generation effects.

=== Process theory ===
Psychology is interested in the current process, i.e. the mental changes and functional relationships between perception, cognition, emotion, and volition/ motivation. Mental (psychological) phenomena are changing processes of consciousness. They can only be determined as an actuality, an "immediate reality of an event in the psychological experience". The relationships of consciousness, i.e. the actively organising processes, are no longer explained metaphysically by means of an immortal 'soul' or an abstract transcendental (spiritual) principle.

=== The delineation of categories ===
Wundt considered that reference to the subject (Subjektbezug), value assessment (Wertbestimmung), the existence of purpose (Zwecksetzung), and volitional acts (Willenstätigkeit) to be specific and fundamental categories for psychology. He frequently used the formulation "the human as a motivated and thinking subject" in order to characterise features held in common with the humanities and the categorical difference to the natural sciences.

=== Psychophysical parallelism ===
Influenced by Leibniz, Wundt introduced the term psychophysical parallelism as follows: "… wherever there are regular relationships between mental and physical phenomena the two are neither identical nor convertible into one another because they are per se incomparable; but they are associated with one another in the way that certain mental processes regularly correspond to certain physical processes or, figuratively expressed, run 'parallel to one another'." Although the inner experience is based on the functions of the brain there are no physical causes for mental changes.

Leibniz wrote: "Souls act according to the laws of final causes, through aspirations, ends and means. Bodies act according to the laws of efficient causes, i.e. the laws of motion. And these two realms, that of efficient causes and that of final causes, harmonize with one another." (Monadology, Paragraph 79).

Wundt follows Leibniz and differentiates between a physical causality (natural causality of neurophysiology) and a mental (psychic) causality of the consciousness process. Both causalities, however, are not opposites in a dualistic metaphysical sense, but depend on the standpoint. Causal explanations in psychology must be content to seek the effects of the antecedent causes without being able to derive exact predictions. Using the example of volitional acts, Wundt describes possible inversion in considering cause and effect, ends and means, and explains how causal and teleological explanations can complement one another to establish a co-ordinated consideration.

Wundt's position differed from contemporary authors who also favoured parallelism. Instead of being content with the postulate of parallelism, he developed his principles of mental causality in contrast to the natural causality of neurophysiology, and a corresponding methodology. There are two fundamentally different approaches of the postulated psychophysical unit, not just two points-of-view in the sense of Gustav Theodor Fechner's identity hypothesis. Psychological and physiological statements exist in two categorically different reference systems; the important categories are to be emphasised in order to prevent category mistakes as discussed by Nicolai Hartmann. In this regard, Wundt created the first genuine epistemology and methodology of empirical psychology (the term philosophy of science did not yet exist).

=== Apperception ===
Apperception is Wundt's central theoretical concept. Leibniz described apperception as the process in which the elementary sensory impressions pass into (self-)consciousness, whereby individual aspirations (striving, volitional acts) play an essential role. Wundt developed psychological concepts, used experimental psychological methods and put forward neuropsychological modelling in the frontal cortex of the brain system – in line with today's thinking. Apperception exhibits a range of theoretical assumptions on the integrative process of consciousness. The selective control of attention is an elementary example of such active cognitive, emotional and motivational integration.

=== Development theory of the mind ===
The fundamental task is to work out a comprehensive development theory of the mind – from animal psychology to the highest cultural achievements in language, religion and ethics. Unlike other thinkers of his time, Wundt had no difficulty connecting the development concepts of the humanities (in the spirit of Friedrich Hegel and Johann Gottfried Herder) with the biological theory of evolution as expounded by Charles Darwin.

=== Critical realism ===
Wundt determined that "psychology is an empirical science co-ordinating natural science and humanities, and that the considerations of both complement one another in the sense that only together can they create for us a potential empirical knowledge." He claimed that his views were free of metaphysics and were based on certain epistemological presuppositions, including the differentiation of subject and object in the perception, and the principle of causality. With his term critical realism, Wundt distinguishes himself from other philosophical positions.

=== Definition of psychology ===
Wundt set himself the task of redefining the broad field of psychology between philosophy and physiology, between the humanities and the natural sciences. In place of the metaphysical definition as a science of the soul came the definition, based on scientific theory, of empirical psychology as a psychology of consciousness with its own categories and epistemological principles. Psychology examines the "entire experience in its immediately subjective reality." The task of psychology is to precisely analyse the processes of consciousness, to assess the complex connections (psychische Verbindungen), and to find the laws governing such relationships.

1. Psychology is 'not a science of the individual soul. Life is a uniform mental and physical process that can be considered in a variety of ways in order to recognise general principles, particularly the psychological-historical and biological principles of development. Wundt demanded an understanding of the emotional and the volitional functions, in addition to cognitive features, as equally important aspects of the unitary (whole) psychophysical process.
2. Psychology cannot be reduced to physiology. The tools of physiology remain fundamentally insufficient for the task of psychology. Such a project is meaningless "because the interrelations between mental processes would be incomprehensible even if the interrelations between brain processes were as clearly understood as the mechanism of a pocket watch."
3. Psychology is concerned with conscious processes. Wundt rejected making subconscious mental processes a topic of scientific psychology for epistemological and methodological reasons. In his day there were, before Sigmund Freud, influential authors such as the philosopher Eduard von Hartmann (1901), who postulated a metaphysics of the unconscious. Wundt had two fundamental objections. He rejected all primarily metaphysically founded psychology and he saw no reliable methodological approach. He also soon revised his initial assumptions about unconscious judgements When Wundt rejects the assumption of "the unconscious" he is also showing his scepticism regarding Fechner's theory of the unconscious and Wundt is perhaps even more greatly influenced by the flood of writing at the time on hypnotism and spiritualism (Wundt, 1879, 1892). While Freud frequently quoted from Wundt's work, Wundt remained sceptical about all hypotheses that operated with the concept of "the unconscious".
  For Wundt it would be just as much a misunderstanding to define psychology as a behavioural science in the sense of the later concept of strict behaviourism. Numerous behavioural and psychological variables had already been observed or measured at the Leipzig laboratory. Wundt stressed that physiological effects, for example the physiological changes accompanying feelings, were only tools of psychology, as were the physical measurements of stimulus intensity in psychophysics. Further developing these methodological approaches one-sidedly would ultimately, however, lead to a behavioural physiology, i.e. a scientific reductionism, and not to a general psychology and cultural psychology.
4. Psychology is an empirical humanities science. Wundt was convinced of the triple status of psychology:
  - as a science of the direct experience it contrasts with the natural sciences that refer to the indirect content of experience and abstract from the subject;
  - as a science "of generally valid forms of direct human experience it is the foundation of the humanities";
  - among all the empirical sciences it was "the one whose results most benefit the examination of the general problems of epistemology and ethics – the two fundamental areas of philosophy."

Wundt's concepts were developed during almost 60 years of research and teaching that led him from neurophysiology to psychology and philosophy. The interrelationships between physiology, philosophy, logic, epistemology and ethics are therefore essential for an understanding of Wundt's psychology. The core of Wundt's areas of interest and guiding ideas can already be seen in his Vorlesungen über die Menschen- und Tierseele (Lectures on Human and Animal Psychology) of 1863: individual psychology (now known as general psychology, i.e. areas such as perception, attention, apperception, volition, will, feelings and emotions); cultural psychology (Wundt's Völkerpsychologie) as development theory of the human mind); animal psychology; and neuropsychology. The initial conceptual outlines of the 30-year-old Wundt (1862, 1863) led to a long research program, to the founding of the first Institute and to the treatment of psychology as a discipline, as well as to a range of fundamental textbooks and numerous other publications.

== Physiology ==
Wundt illusion

During the Heidelberg years from 1853 to 1873, Wundt published numerous essays on physiology, particularly on experimental neurophysiology, a textbook on human physiology (1865, 4th ed. 1878) and a manual of medical physics (1867). He wrote about 70 reviews of current publications in the fields of neurophysiology and neurology, physiology, anatomy and histology. A second area of work was sensory physiology, including spatial perception, visual perception and optical illusions. An optical illusion described by him is called the Wundt illusion, a variant of the Hering Illusion. It shows how straight lines appear curved when seen against a set of radiating lines.

== Psychology ==
=== Starting point ===
As a result of his medical training and his work as an assistant to Hermann von Helmholtz, Wundt knew the benchmarks of experimental research, as well as the speculative nature of psychology in the mid-19th century. Wundt's aspiration for scientific research and the necessary methodological critique were clear when he wrote of the language of ordinary people, who merely invoked their personal experiences of life, criticized naive introspection, or quoted the influence of uncritical amateur ("folk") psychology on psychological interpretation.

His Beiträge zur Theorie der Sinneswahrnehmung (1862) shows Wundt's transition from a physiologist to an experimental psychologist. "Why does not psychology follow the example of the natural sciences? It is an understanding that, from every side of the history of the natural sciences, informs us that the progress of every science is closely connected with the progress made regarding experimental methods." With this statement, however, he will in no way treat psychology as a pure natural science, though psychologists should learn from the progress of methods in the natural sciences: "There are two sciences that must come to the aid of general psychology in this regard: the development history of the mind and comparative psychology."

=== General psychology ===
The Grundzüge der physiologischen Psychologie (Main Features of Physiological Psychology) on general psychology is Wundt's best-known textbook. He wanted to connect two sciences with one another. "Physiology provides information on all phenomena of life that can be perceived using our external senses. In psychology humans examine themselves, as it were, from within and look for the connections between these processes to explain which of them represent this inner observation."

"With sufficient certainty the approach can indeed be seen as well-founded – that nothing takes place in our consciousness that does not have its physical basis in certain physiological processes.". Wundt believed that physiological psychology had the following task: "firstly, to investigate those life processes that are centrally located, between external and internal experience, which make it necessary to use both observation methods simultaneously, external and internal, and, secondly, to illuminate and, where possible, determine a total view of human existence from the points of view gained from this investigation." "The attribute 'physiological' is not saying that it ... [physiological psychology] ... wants to reduce the psychology to physiology – which I consider impossible – but that it works with physiological, i.e. experimental, tools and, indeed, more so than is usual in other psychology, takes into account the relationship between mental and physical processes." "If one wants to treat the peculiarities of the method as the most important factor then our science – as experimental psychology – differs from the usual science of the soul purely based on self-observation." After long chapters on the anatomy and physiology of the nervous system, the Grundzüge (1874) has five sections: the mental elements, mental structure, interactions of the mental structure, mental developments, the principles and laws of mental causality. Through his insistence that mental processes were analysed in their elements, Wundt did not want to create a pure element psychology because the elements should simultaneously be related to one another. He describes the sensory impression with the simple sensory feelings, perceptions and volitional acts connected with them, and he explains dependencies and feedbacks.

=== Apperception theory ===
Wundt rejected the widespread association theory, according to which mental connections (learning) are mainly formed through the frequency and intensity of particular processes. His term apperception psychology means that he considered the creative conscious activity to be more important than elementary association. Apperception is an emergent activity that is both arbitrary and selective as well as imaginative and comparative. In this process, feelings and ideas are images apperceptively connected with typical tones of feeling, selected in a variety of ways, analysed, associated and combined, as well as linked with motor and autonomic functions – not simply processed but also creatively synthesised (see below on the Principle of creative synthesis). In the integrative process of conscious activity, Wundt sees an elementary activity of the subject, i.e. an act of volition, to deliberately move content into the conscious. Insofar that this emergent activity is typical of all mental processes, it is possible to describe his point-of-view as voluntaristic.

Wundt describes apperceptive processes as psychologically highly differentiated and, in many regards, bases this on methods and results from his experimental research. One example is the wide-ranging series of experiments on the mental chronometry of complex reaction times. In research on feelings, certain effects are provoked while pulse and breathing are recorded using a kymograph. The observed differences were intended to contribute towards supporting Wundt's theory of emotions with its three dimensions: pleasant – unpleasant, tense – relaxed, excited – depressed.

=== Cultural psychology ===
Wilhelm Wundt's Völkerpsychologie. Eine Untersuchung der Entwicklungsgesetze von Sprache, Mythus und Sitte (Social Psychology. An Investigation of the Laws of Evolution of Language, Myth, and Custom, 1900–1920, 10 Vols.) which also contains the evolution of Arts, Law, Society, Culture and History, is a milestone project, a monument of cultural psychology, of the early 20th century. The dynamics of cultural development were investigated according to psychological and epistemological principles. Psychological principles were derived from Wundt's psychology of apperception (theory of higher integrative processes, including association, assimilation, semantic change) and motivation (will), as presented in his Grundzüge der physiologischen Psychologie (1908–1910, 6th ed., 3 Vols.). In contrast to individual psychology, cultural psychology aims to illustrate general mental development laws governing higher intellectual processes: the development of thought, language, artistic imagination, myths, religion, customs, the relationship of individuals to society, the intellectual environment and the creation of intellectual works in a society. "Where deliberate experimentation ends is where history has experimented on the behalf of psychologists." Those mental processes that "underpin the general development of human societies and the creation of joint intellectual results that are of generally recognised value" are to be examined.

Stimulated by the ideas of previous thinkers, such as Johann Gottfried Herder, Johann Friedrich Herbart, Georg Wilhelm Friedrich Hegel and Wilhelm von Humboldt (with his ideas about comparative linguistics), the psychologist Moritz Lazarus (1851) and the linguist Heymann Steinthal founded the Zeitschrift für Völkerpsychologie und Sprachwissenschaft (Journal for Cultural Psychology and Linguistics) in 1860, which gave this field its name. Wundt (1888) critically analysed the, in his view, still disorganised intentions of Lazarus and Steinthal and limited the scope of the issues by proposing a psychologically constituted structure. The cultural psychology of language, myth, and customs were to be based on the three main areas of general psychology: imagining and thought, feelings, and will (motivation). The numerous mental interrelations and principles were to be researched under the perspective of cultural development. Apperception theory applied equally for general psychology and cultural psychology. Changes in meanings and motives were examined in many lines of development, and there are detailed interpretations based on the emergence principle (creative synthesis), the principle of unintended side-effects (heterogony of ends) and the principle of contrast (see section on Methodology and Strategies).

The ten volumes consist of: Language (Vols. 1 and 2), Art (Vol. 3), Myths and Religion (Vols. 4 – 6), Society (Vols. 7 and 8), Law (Vol. 9), as well as Culture and History (Vol. 10). The methodology of cultural psychology was mainly described later, in Logik (1921). Wundt worked on, psychologically linked, and structured an immense amount of material. The topics range from agriculture and trade, crafts and property, through gods, myths and Christianity, marriage and family, peoples and nations to (self-)education and self-awareness, science, the world and humanity.

Wundt recognized about 20 fundamental dynamic motives in cultural development. Motives frequently quoted in cultural development are: division of labour, ensoulment, salvation, happiness, production and imitation, child-raising, artistic drive, welfare, arts and magic, adornment, guilt, punishment, atonement, self-education, play, and revenge. Other values and motives emerge in the areas of freedom and justice, war and peace, legal structures, state structures and forms of government; also regarding the development of a world view of culture, religion, state, traffic, and a worldwide political and social society. In religious considerations, many of the values and motives (i.e. belief in soul, immortality, belief in gods and demons, ritualistic acts, witchcraft, animism and totemism) are combined with the motives of art, imagination, dance and ecstasy, as well as with forms of family and power.

Wundt saw examples of human self-education in walking upright, physical facilities and "an interaction in part forced upon people by external conditions and in part the result of voluntary culture". He described the random appearance and later conscious control of fire as a similar interaction between two motives. In the interaction of human activity and the conditions of nature he saw a creative principle of culture right from the start; tools as cultural products of a second nature. An interactive system of cause and effect, a system of purposes and thus values (and reflexively from standards of one's own activities) is formed according to the principles of one's own thinking.

In the Elemente der Völkerpsychologie (The Elements of Cultural Psychology, 1912) Wundt sketched out four main levels of cultural development: primitive man, the totemistic age, the age of heroes and gods, and the development of humanity. The delineations were unclear and the depiction was greatly simplified. Only this book was translated into English Elements of folk-psychology), thus providing but a much abridged insight into Wundt's differentiated cultural psychology. (The Folk Psychology part of the title already demonstrates the low level of understanding).

In retrospect, 'Völkerpsychologie' was an unfortunate choice of title because it is often misinterpreted as ethnology. Wundt also considered calling it (Social) Anthropology, Social Psychology and Community Psychology. The term Kulturpsychologie would have been more fitting though psychological development theory of the mind would have expressed Wundt's intentions even better. The intellectual potential and heuristics of Wundt's Cultural Psychology are by no means exhausted.

=== Neuropsychology ===
Wundt contributed to the state of neuropsychology as it existed at the time in three ways: through his criticism of the theory of localisation (then widespread in neurology), through his demand for research hypotheses founded on both neurological and psychological thinking, and through his neuropsychological concept of an apperception centre in the frontal cortex. Wundt considered attention and the control of attention an excellent example of the desirable combination of experimental psychological and neurophysiological research. Wundt called for experimentation to localise the higher central nervous functions to be based on clear, psychologically based research hypotheses because the questions could not be rendered precisely enough on the anatomical and physiological levels alone.

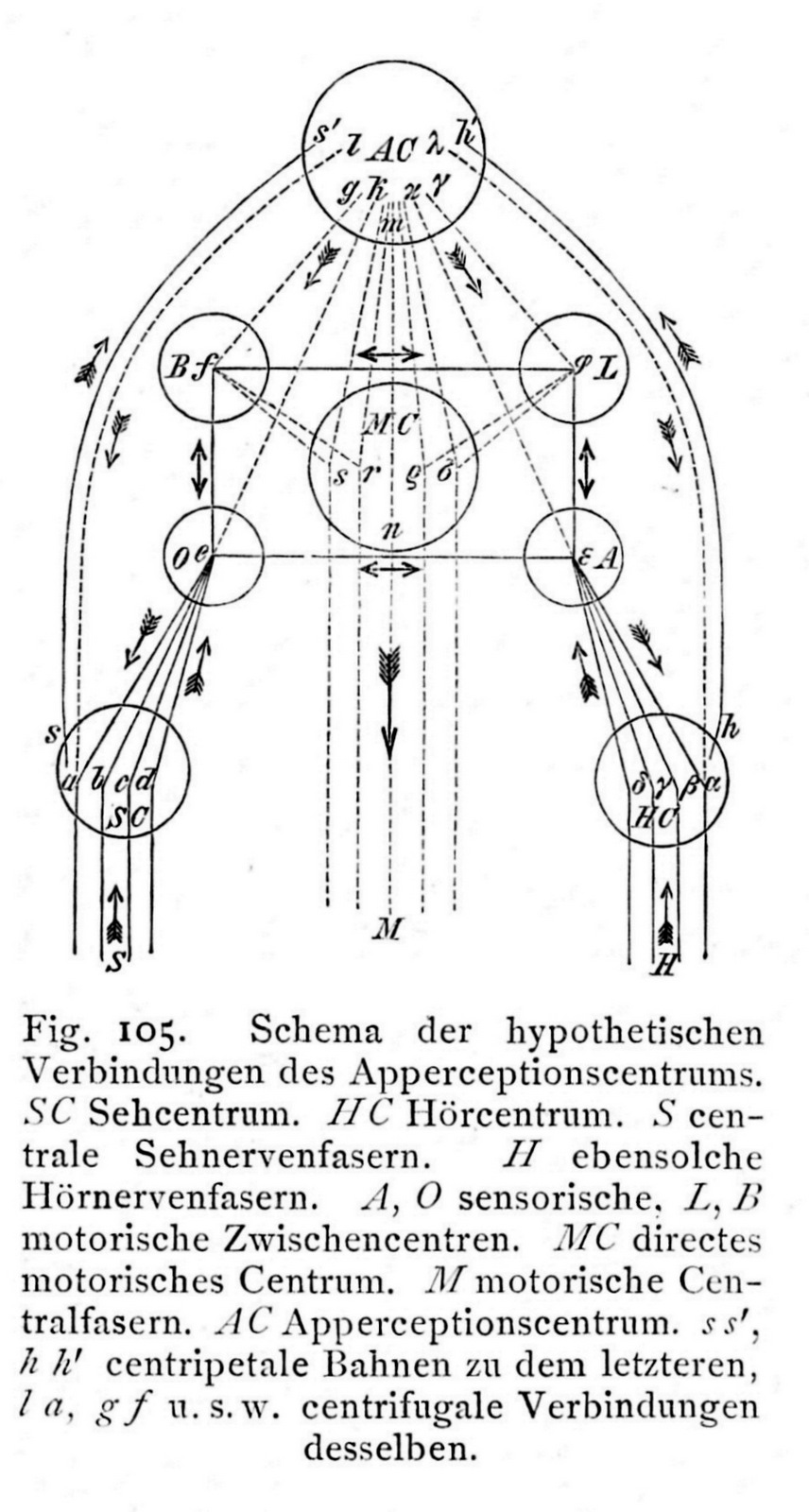
(Wundt, Grundzüge, 1903, 5th ed. Vol. 1, p. 324.)

Wundt based his central theory of apperception on neuropsychological modelling (from the 3rd edition of the Grundzüge onwards). According to this, the hypothetical apperception centre in the frontal cerebral cortex that he described could interconnect sensory, motor, autonomic, cognitive, emotional and motivational process components Wundt thus provided the guiding principle of a primarily psychologically oriented research programme on the highest integrative processes. He is therefore a forerunner of current research on cognitive and emotional executive functions in the prefrontal cerebral cortex, and on hypothetical multimodal convergence zones in the network of cortical and limbic functions. This concept of an interdisciplinary neuroscience is now taken for granted, but Wundt's contribution towards this development has almost been forgotten. C.S. Sherrington repeatedly quotes Wundt's research on the physiology of the reflexes in his textbook, but not Wundt's neuropsychological concepts.

== Methodology and strategies ==
"Given its position between the natural sciences and the humanities, psychology really does have a great wealth of methodological tools. While, on the one hand, there are the experimental methods, on the other hand, objective works and products in cultural development (Objektivationen des menschlichen Geistes) also offer up abundant material for comparative psychological analysis".

Psychology is an empirical science and must endeavor to achieve a systematic procedure, examination of results, and criticism of its methodology. Thus self-observation must be trained and is only permissible under strict experimental control; Wundt decisively rejects naive introspection. Wundt provided a standard definition of psychological experiments. His criticism of Immanuel Kant (Wundt, 1874) had a major influence. Kant had argued against the assumption of the measurability of conscious processes and made a well-founded, if very short, criticism of the methods of self-observation: regarding method-inherent reactivity, observer error, distorting attitudes of the subject, and the questionable influence of independently thinking people, but Wundt expressed himself optimistic that methodological improvements could be of help here. He later admitted that measurement and mathematics were only applicable for very elementary conscious processes. Statistical methods were also of only limited value, for example in psychophysics or in the evaluation of population statistics.

Experimental psychology in Leipzig mainly lent on four methodological types of assessment: the impression methods with their various measurement techniques in psychophysics; the reaction methods for chronometry in the psychology of apperception; the reproduction methods in research on memory, and the expression methods with observations and psychophysiological measurement in research on feelings. Wundt considered the methodology of his linguistic psychological investigations (Vols. 1 and 2 of Völkerpsychologie) to be the most fruitful path to adequate psychological research on the thought process.

The principles of his cultural psychological methodology were only worked out later. These involved the analytical and comparative observation of objective existing materials, i.e. historical writings, language, works, art, reports and observations of human behaviour in earlier cultures and, more rarely, direct ethnological source material. Wundt differentiated between two objectives of comparative methodology: individual comparison collected all the important features of the overall picture of an observation material, while generic comparison formed a picture of variations to obtain a typology. Rules of generic comparison and critical interpretation are essentially explained in his Logik:

"We therefore generally describe the epitome of the methods as interpretation that is intended to provide us with an understanding of mental processes and intellectual creation." Wundt clearly referred to the tradition of humanistic hermeneutics, but argued that the interpretation process basically also followed psychological principles. Interpretation only became the characteristic process of the humanities through criticism. It is a process that is set against interpretation to dismantle the interaction produced through psychological analysis. It examines external or internal contradictions, it should evaluate the reality of intellectual products, and is also a criticism of values and a criticism of opinions. The typical misconceptions of the intellectualistic, individualistic and unhistorical interpretation of intellectual processes all have "their source in the habitually coarse psychology based on subjective assessment."

=== Principles of mental causality ===
What is meant by these principles is the simple prerequisites of the linking of psychological facts that cannot be further extrapolated. The system of principles has several repeatedly reworked versions, with corresponding laws of development for cultural psychology (Wundt, 1874, 1894, 1897, 1902–1903, 1920, 1921). Wundt mainly differentiated between four principles and explained them with examples that originate from the physiology of perception, the psychology of meaning, from apperception research, emotion and motivation theory, and from cultural psychology and ethics.

1. The Principle of creative synthesis or creative results (the emergence principle). "Every perception can be broken down into elemental impressions. But it is never just the sum of these impressions, but from the linkage of them that a new one is created with individual features that were not contained in the impressions themselves. We thus put together the mental picture of a spatial form from a multitude of impressions of light. This principle proves itself in all mental causality linkages and accompanies mental development from its first to its consummate stage." Wundt formulated this creative synthesis, which today would also be described as the principle of emergence in system theory, as an essential epistemological principle of empirical psychology – long before the phrase the whole is more than the sum of its parts or supra-summation was used in gestalt psychology.
2. The Principle of relational analysis (context principle). This principle says that "every individual mental content receives its meaning through the relationships in which it stands to other mental content."
3. The Principle of mental contrasts or reinforcement of opposites or development in dichotomies. Typical contrast effects are to be seen in sensory perceptions, in the course of emotions and in volitional processes. There is a general tendency to order the subjective world according to opposites. Thus many individual, historical, economic and social processes exhibit highly contrasting developments.
4. The Principle of the heterogony of purpose (ends). The consequences of an action extend beyond the original intended purpose and give rise to new motives with new effects. The intended purpose always induces side-effects and knock-on effects that themselves become purposes, i.e. an ever-growing organisation through self-creation.

In addition to these four principles, Wundt explained the term of intellectual community and other categories and principles that have an important relational and insightful function.

Wundt demands co-ordinated analysis of causal and teleological aspects; he called for a methodologically versatile psychology and did not demand that any decision be made between experimental-statistical methods and interpretative methods (qualitative methods). Whenever appropriate, he referred to findings from interpretation and experimental research within a multimethod approach. Thus, for example, the chapters on the development of language or on enlargement of fantasy activity in cultural psychology also contain experimental, statistical and psychophysiological findings. He was very familiar with these methods and used them in extended research projects. This was without precedent and has, since then, rarely been achieved by another individual researcher.

== Philosophy ==
=== Wundt's philosophical orientation ===
In the introduction to his Grundzüge der physiologischen Psychologie in 1874, Wundt described Immanuel Kant and Johann Friedrich Herbart as the philosophers who had the most influence on the formation of his own views. Those who follow up these references will find that Wundt critically analysed both these thinkers' ideas. He distanced himself from Herbart's science of the soul and, in particular, from his "mechanism of mental representations" and pseudo-mathematical speculations. While Wundt praised Kant's critical work and his rejection of a "rational" psychology deduced from metaphysics, he argued against Kant's epistemology in his publication Was soll uns Kant nicht sein? (What Kant should we reject?) 1892 with regard to the forms of perception and presuppositions, as well as Kant's category theory and his position in the dispute on causal and teleological explanations.

Gottfried Wilhelm Leibniz had a far greater and more constructive influence on Wundt's psychology, philosophy, epistemology and ethics. This can be gleaned from Wundt's Leibniz publication (1917) and from his central terms and principles, but has since received almost no attention. Wundt gave up his plans for a biography of Leibniz, but praised Leibniz's thinking on the two-hundredth anniversary of his death in 1916. He did, however, disagree with Leibniz's monadology as well as theories on the mathematisation of the world by removing the domain of the mind from this view. Leibniz developed a new concept of the soul through his discussion on substance and actuality, on dynamic spiritual change, and on the correspondence between body and soul (parallelism). Wundt secularised such guiding principles and reformulated important philosophical positions of Leibniz away from belief in God as the creator and belief in an immortal soul. Wundt gained important ideas and exploited them in an original way in his principles and methodology of empirical psychology: the principle of actuality, psychophysical parallelism, combination of causal and teleological analysis, apperception theory, the psychology of striving, i.e. volition and voluntary tendency, principles of epistemology and the perspectivism of thought. Wundt's differentiation between the "natural causality" of neurophysiology and the "mental causality" of psychology (the intellect), is a direct rendering from Leibniz's epistemology.

Wundt devised the term psychophysical parallelism and meant thereby two fundamentally different ways of considering the postulated psychophysical unit, not just two views in the sense of Fechner's theory of identity. Wundt derived the co-ordinated consideration of natural causality and mental causality from Leibniz's differentiation between causality and teleology (principle of sufficient reason). The psychological and physiological statements exist in two categorically different reference systems; the main categories are to be emphasised in order to prevent category mistakes. With his epistemology of mental causality, he differed from contemporary authors who also advocated the position of parallelism. Wundt had developed the first genuine epistemology and methodology of empirical psychology.

Wundt shaped the term apperception, introduced by Leibniz, into an experimental psychologically based apperception psychology that included neuropsychological modelling. When Leibniz differentiates between two fundamental functions, perception and striving, this approach can be recognised in Wundt's motivation theory. The central theme of "unity in the manifold" (unitas in multitudine) also originates from Leibniz, who has influenced the current understanding of perspectivism and viewpoint dependency. Wundt characterised this style of thought in a way that also applied for him: "…the principle of the equality of viewpoints that supplement one another" plays a significant role in his thinking – viewpoints that "supplement one another, while also being able to appear as opposites that only resolve themselves when considered more deeply."

Unlike the great majority of contemporary and current authors in psychology, Wundt laid out the philosophical and methodological positions of his work clearly. Wundt was against the founding empirical psychology on a (metaphysical or structural) principle of soul as in Christian belief in an immortal soul or in a philosophy that argues "substance"-ontologically. Wundt's position was decisively rejected by several Christianity-oriented psychologists and philosophers as a psychology without soul, although he did not use this formulation from Friedrich Lange (1866), who was his predecessor in Zürich from 1870 to 1872. Wundt's guiding principle was the development theory of the mind. Wundt's ethics also led to polemical critiques due to his renunciation of an ultimate transcendental basis of ethics (God, the Absolute). Wundt's evolutionism was also criticised for its claim that ethical norms had been culturally changed in the course of human intellectual development.

Wundt's autobiography and his inaugural lectures in Zurich and Leipzig as well as his commemorative speeches for Fechner and his Essay on Leibniz provide an insight into the history of Wundt's education and the contemporary flows and intellectual controversies in the second half of the 19th century. Wundt primarily refers to Leibniz and Kant, more indirectly to Johann Gottlieb Fichte, Georg Wilhelm Friedrich Hegel, Friedrich Wilhelm Joseph Schelling and Arthur Schopenhauer; and to Johann Friedrich Herbart, Gustav Theodor Fechner and Hermann Lotze regarding psychology. In addition to John Locke, George Berkeley, David Hume and John Stuart Mill, one finds Francis Bacon, Charles Darwin and Charles Spencer, as well as French thinkers such as Auguste Comte and Hippolyte Taine, all of whom are more rarely quoted by Wundt.

=== Metaphysics ===
Wundt distanced himself from the metaphysical term soul and from theories about its structure and properties, as posited by Herbart, Lotze, and Fechner. Wundt followed Kant and warned against a primarily metaphysically founded, philosophically deduced psychology: "where one notices the author's metaphysical point-of-view in the treatment of every problem then an unconditional empirical science is no longer involved – but a metaphysical theory intended to serve as an exemplification of experience." He is, however, convinced that every single science contains general prerequisites of a philosophical nature. "All psychological investigation extrapolates from metaphysical presuppositions." Epistemology was to help sciences find out about, clarify or supplement their metaphysical aspects and as far as possible free themselves of them. Psychology and the other sciences always rely on the help of philosophy here, and particularly on logic and epistemology, otherwise only an immanent philosophy, i.e. metaphysical assumptions of an unsystematic nature, would form in the individual sciences. Wundt is decidedly against the segregation of philosophy. He is concerned about psychologists bringing their own personal metaphysical convictions into psychology and that these presumptions would no longer be exposed to epistemological criticism. "Therefore nobody would suffer more from such a segregation than the psychologists themselves and, through them, psychology." "Nothing would promote the degeneration [of psychology] to a mere craftsmanship more than its segregation from philosophy."

=== System of philosophy ===
Wundt claimed that philosophy as a general science has the task of "uniting to become a consistent system through the general knowledge acquired via the individual sciences." Human rationality strives for a uniform, i.e. non-contradictory, explanatory principle for being and consciousness, for an ultimate reasoning for ethics, and for a philosophical world basis. "Metaphysics is the same attempt to gain a binding world view, as a component of individual knowledge, on the basis of the entire scientific awareness of an age or particularly prominent content." Wundt was convinced that empirical psychology also contributed fundamental knowledge on the understanding of humans – for anthropology and ethics – beyond its narrow scientific field. Starting from the active and creative-synthetic apperception processes of consciousness, Wundt considered that the unifying function was to be found in volitional processes and the conscious setting of objectives and subsequent activities. "There is simply nothing more to a man that he can entirely call his own – except for his will." One can detect a "voluntaristic tendency" in Wundt's theory of motivation, in contrast to the currently widespread cognitivism (intellectualism). Wundt extrapolated this empirically founded volitional psychology to a metaphysical voluntarism. He demands, however, that the empirical-psychological and derived metaphysical voluntarism are kept apart from one another and firmly maintained that his empirical psychology was created independently of the various teachings of metaphysics.

Wundt interpreted intellectual-cultural progress and biological evolution as a general process of development whereby, however, he did not want to follow the abstract ideas of entelechy, vitalism, animism, and by no means Schopenhauer's volitional metaphysics. He believed that the source of dynamic development was to be found in the most elementary expressions of life, in reflexive and instinctive behaviour, and constructed a continuum of attentive and apperceptive processes, volitional or selective acts, up to social activities and ethical decisions. At the end of this rational idea he recognised a practical ideal: the idea of humanity as the highest yardstick of our actions and that the overall course of human history can be understood with regard to the ideal of humanity.

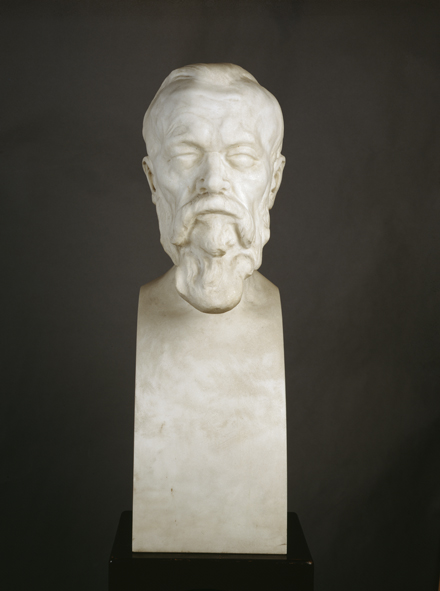
Wilhelm Wundt portrait bust by Max Klinger 1908

=== Ethics ===
Parallel to Wundt's work on cultural psychology he wrote his much-read Ethik (1886, 3rd ed. in 2 Vols., 1903), whose introduction stressed how important development considerations are in order to grasp religion, customs and morality. Wundt considered the questions of ethics to be closely linked with the empirical psychology of motivated acts "Psychology has been such an important introduction for me, and such an indispensable aid for the investigation of ethics, that I do not understand how one could do without it." Wundt sees two paths: the anthropological examination of the facts of a moral life (in the sense of cultural psychology) and the scientific reflection on the concepts of morals. The derived principles are to be examined in a variety of areas: the family, society, the state, education, etc. In his discussion on free will (as an attempt to mediate between determinism and indeterminism) he categorically distinguishes between two perspectives: there is indeed a natural causality of brain processes, though conscious processes are not determined by an intelligible, but by the empirical character of humans – volitional acts are subject to the principles of mental causality. "When a man only follows inner causality he acts freely in an ethical sense, which is partly determined by his original disposition and partly by the development of his character."

On the one hand, Ethics is a normative discipline while, on the other hand, these 'rules' change, as can be seen from the empirical examination of culture-related morality. Wundt's ethics can, put simply, be interpreted as an attempt to mediate between Kant's apriorism and empiricism. Moral rules are the legislative results of a universal intellectual development, but are neither rigidly defined nor do they simply follow changing life conditions. Individualism and utilitarianism are strictly rejected. In his view, only the universal intellectual life can be considered to be an end in itself. Wundt also spoke on the idea of humanity in ethics, on human rights and human duties in his speech as Rector of Leipzig University in 1889 on the centenary of the French Revolution.

=== Logic, epistemology and the scientific theory of psychology ===
Wundt divided up his three-volume Logik into General logic and epistemology, Logic of the exact sciences, and Logic of the humanities. While logic, the doctrine of categories, and other principles were discussed by Wundt in a traditional manner, they were also considered from the point of view of development theory of the human intellect, i.e. in accordance with the psychology of thought. The subsequent equitable description of the special principles of the natural sciences and the humanities enabled Wundt to create a new epistemology. The ideas that remain current include epistemology and the methodology of psychology: the tasks and directions of psychology, the methods of interpretation and comparison, as well as psychological experimentation.

== Complete works and legacy ==
=== Publications, libraries and letters ===
Wilhelm Wundt commemorative plaque, University of Leipzig

The list of works at the Max Planck Institute for the History of Science includes a total of 589 German and foreign-language editions for the period from 1853 to 1950 MPI für Wissenschaftsgeschichte: Werkverzeichnis Wilhelm Wundt.The American psychologist Edwin Boring counted 494 publications by Wundt (excluding pure reprints but with revised editions) that are, on average, 110 pages long and amount to a total of 53,735 pages. Thus Wundt published an average of seven works per year over a period of 68 years and wrote or revised an average of 2.2 pages per day. There is as yet no annotated edition of the essential writings, nor does a complete edition of Wundt's major works exist, apart from more-or-less suitable scans or digitalisations.

Apart from his library and his correspondence, Wundt's extraordinarily extensive written inheritance also includes many extracts, manuscripts, lecture notes and other materials Wundt's written inheritance in Leipzig consists of 5,576 documents, mainly letters, and was digitalised by the Leipzig University Library. The catalogue is available at the Kalliope online portal.

One-third of Wundt's own library was left to his children Eleonore and Max Wundt; most of the works were sold during the times of need after the First World War to Tohoku University in Sendai, Japan. The university's stock consists of 6,762 volumes in western languages (including bound periodicals) as well as 9,098 special print runs and brochures from the original Wundt Library. The list in the Max Planck Institute for the History of Science only mentions 575 of these entries. Tübingen University Archive's stock includes copies of 613 letters, Wundt's will, lists from Wundt's original library, and other materials and 'Wundtiana': The German Historical Museum in Berlin has a 1918 shellac disk on which Wundt repeats the closing words of his inaugural lecture (given in Zürich on 31 October 1874 and re-read in 1918 for documentation purposes): "On the task of philosophy in the present"

=== Biographies ===
The last Wundt biography which tried to represent both Wundt's psychology and his philosophy was by Eisler (1902). One can also get an idea of Wundt's thoughts from his autobiography Erlebtes und Erkanntes (1920). Later biographies by Nef (1923) and Petersen (1925) up to Arnold in 1980 restrict themselves primarily to the psychology or the philosophy. Eleonore Wundt's (1928) knowledgeable but short biography of her father exceeds many others' efforts.

=== Political attitude ===
At the start of the First World War, Wundt, like Edmund Husserl and Max Planck, signed the patriotic call to arms as did about 4,000 professors and lecturers in Germany, and during the following years he wrote several political speeches and essays that were also characterized by the feeling of a superiority of German science and culture.

During Wundt's early Heidelberg time he espoused liberal views. He co-founded the Association of German Workers' Associations. He was a member of the liberal Progressive Party of Baden. From 1866 to 1869 he represented Heidelberg in the Baden States Assembly.

In old age Wundt appeared to become more conservative (see Wundt, 1920; Wundt's correspondence), then – also in response to World War I, the subsequent social unrest and the severe revolutionary events of the post-war period – adopted an attitude that was patriotic and lent towards nationalism.

Wilhelm Wundt's son, philosopher Max Wundt, had an even more clearly intense, somewhat nationalist, stance. Although not a member of the Nazi party (NSDAP), Max Wundt wrote about national traditions and race in philosophical thinking.

=== Wundt Societies ===
Four Wilhelm Wundt Societies or Associations have been founded:

- 1925 to 1968: Wilhelm Wundt Stiftung und Verband Freunde des Psychologischen Instituts der Universität Leipzig, founded by Wundt's former assistants and friends.
- 1979: Wilhelm Wundt Gesellschaft (based in Heidelberg), "a scientific association with a limited number of members set up with the aim of promoting fundamental psychological research and further developing it through its efforts."
- 1992 to 1996: Wundt-Stiftung e.V. und Förderverein Wundt-Stiftung e.V. (based in Bonn/Leipzig).
- 2016: Förderverein Wilhelm-Wundt-Haus in Grossbothen. The purpose of the association is "the maintenance and restoration of the Wundt home in keeping with its listed building status, as well as its appropriate use". The association was founded on the initiative of Jüttemann (2014).

The Deutsche Gesellschaft für Psychologie German Society for Psychology grants a Wilhelm-Wundt Medal.

=== Memorials ===
A few months before Wundt's death, the Leipzig town council arranged for a commemorative oak tree to be planted in Clara Zetkin Park. The tree still exists, with a memorial plaque.

Leipzig University arranged for a memorial plaque to be placed in the main entrance of the university.

== Reception of Wundt's work ==
=== Reception by his contemporaries ===
The psychiatrist Emil Kraepelin described the spirit at the new Leipzig Institute in this fashion: "We felt that we were trailblazers entering virgin territory, like creators of a science with undreamt-of prospects. Wundt spent several afternoons every week in his adjacent modest Professorial office, came to see us, advised us and often got involved in the experiments; he was also available to us at any time."

The philosopher Rudolf Eisler considered Wundt's approach as follows: "A major advantage of Wundt's philosophy is that it neither consciously nor unconsciously takes metaphysics back to its beginnings, but strictly distinguishes between empirical-scientific and epistemological-metaphysical approaches, and considers each point-of-view in isolation in its relative legitimacy before finally producing a uniform world view. Wundt always differentiates between the physical-physiological and the purely psychological, and then again from the philosophical point-of-view. As a result, apparent 'contradictions' are created for those who do not observe more precisely and who constantly forget that the differences in results are only due to the approach and not the laws of reality ..." Traugott Oesterreich (1923/1951) wrote an unusually detailed description of Wundt's work in his Grundriss der Geschichte der Philosophie (Foundations of the History of Philosophy). This knowledgeable representation examines Wundt's main topics, views and scientific activities and exceeds the generally much briefer Wundt reception within the field of psychology, in which many of the important prerequisites and references are ignored right from the start.

The internal consistency of Wundt's work from 1862 to 1920, between the main works and within the reworked editions, has repeatedly been discussed and been subject to differing assessments in parts. One could not say that the scientific conception of psychology underwent a fundamental revision of principal ideas and central postulates, though there was gradual development and a change in emphasis. One could consider Wundt's gradual concurrence with Kant's position, that conscious processes are not measurable on the basis of self-observation and cannot be mathematically formulated, to be a major divergence. Wundt, however, never claimed that psychology could be advanced through experiment and measurement alone, but had already stressed in 1862 that the development history of the mind and comparative psychology should provide some assistance.

Wundt attempted to redefine and restructure the fields of psychology and philosophy. "Experimental psychology in the narrower sense and child psychology form individual psychology, while cultural and animal psychology are both parts of a general and comparative psychology"). None of his Leipzig assistants and hardly any textbook authors in the subsequent two generations have adopted Wundt's broad theoretical horizon, his demanding scientific theory or the multi-method approach. Oswald Külpe had already ruled cultural and animal psychology out.

While the Principles of physiological Psychology met with worldwide resonance, Wundt's cultural psychology (ethno-psychology) appeared to have had a less widespread impact. But there are indications that George Herbert Mead and Franz Boas, among others, were influenced by it. In his Totem and Taboo, Sigmund Freud frequently quoted Wundt's cultural psychology. In its time, Wundt's Ethik received more reviews than almost any of his other main works. Most of the objections were ranged against his renouncing any ultimate transcendental ethical basis (God, the Absolute), as well as against his ideas regarding evolution, i.e. that ethical standards changed culturally in the course of human intellectual development. As Wundt did not describe any concrete ethical conflicts on the basis of examples and did not describe any social ethics in particular, his teachings with the general idea of humanism appear rather too abstract.

The XXII International Congress for Psychology in Leipzig in 1980, i.e. on the hundredth jubilee of the initial founding of the institute in 1879, stimulated a number of publications about Wundt, also in the US Very little productive research work has been carried out since then. While Wundt was occasionally mentioned in the centenary review of the founding of the German Society for Experimental Psychology 1904/2004, it was without the principal ideas of his psychology and philosophy of science.

=== Research on reception of his work ===
Leipzig was a world-famous centre for the new psychology after 1874. There are various interpretations regarding why Wundt's influence after the turn of the century, i.e. during his lifetime, rapidly waned and from his position as founding father Wundt became almost an outsider. A survey was conducted on the basis of more than 200 contemporary and later sources: reviews and critiques of his publications (since 1858), references to Wundt's work in textbooks on psychology and the history of psychology (from 1883 to 2010), biographies, congress reports, praise on his decadal birthdays, obituaries and other texts. A range of scientific controversies were presented in detail. Reasons for the distancing of Wundt and why some of his concepts have fallen into oblivion can be seen in his scientific work, in his philosophical orientation, in his didactics or in the person of Wundt himself:

- Possibly the most important reason for Wundt's relatively low influence might lie in his highly ambitious epistemologically founded conception of psychology, in his theory of science and in the level of difficulty involved in his wide-ranging methodology.
- Most psychologies in the subsequent generation appear to have a considerably simpler, less demanding, philosophical point-of-view instead of coordinated causal and teleological considerations embedded in multiple reference systems that consequently also demanded a multi-method approach. Thus instead of perspectivism and a change in perspective an apparently straightforward approach is preferred, i.e. research oriented upon either the natural sciences or the humanities.
- Wundt's assistants and colleagues, many of whom were also personally close, did not take on the role of students and certainly not the role of interpreters. Oswald Külpe, Ernst Meumann, Hugo Münsterberg or Felix Krueger did not want to, or could not, adequately reference Wundt's comprehensive scientific conception of psychology in their books, for example they almost entirely ignored Wundt's categories and epistemological principles, his strategies in comparison and interpretation, the discussions regarding Kant's in-depth criticism of methodology, and Wundt's neuropsychology. Nobody in this circle developed a creative continuation of Wundt's concepts. Krueger's inner distance to a scientific concept and the entire work of his predecessor cannot be overlooked.
- Through his definition of "soul" as an actual process, Wundt gave up the metaphysical idea of a "substantial carrier"; his psychology without a soul was heavily criticized by several contemporary and later psychologists and philosophers.
- Wundt exposed himself to criticism with his theoretical and experimental psychologically differentiated apperception psychology as opposed to elemental association psychology, and with his comprehensive research programme on a development theory of the human intellect, now seen as an interdisciplinary or trans-disciplinary project.

=== Misunderstandings of basic terms and principles ===
Wundt's terminology also created difficulties because he had – from today's point-of-view – given some of his most important ideas unfortunate names so that there were constant misunderstandings. Examples include:

- Physiological psychology – specifically not a scientific physiological psychology, because by writing the adjective with a small letter Wundt wanted to avoid this misunderstanding that still exists today; for him it was the use of physiological aids in experimental general psychology that mattered.
- Self-observation – not naive introspection, but with training and experimental control of conditions.
- Experiment – this was meant with reference to Francis Bacon – general, i.e. far beyond the scientific rules of the empirical sciences, so not necessarily a statistically evaluated laboratory experiment. For Wundt psychological experimentation primarily served as a check of trained self-observation.
- Element – not in the sense of the smallest structure, but as a smallest unit of the intended level under consideration, so that, for example, even the central nervous system could be an "element".
- Völkerpsychologie – cultural psychology – not ethnology.
- Apperception – not just an increase in attention, but a central and multimodal synthesis.
- Voluntaristic tendency, voluntarism – not an absolute metaphysical postulate, but a primary empirically psychologically based accentuation of motivated action against the intellectualism and cognitivism of other psychologists.

A representation of Wundt's psychology as 'natural science', 'element psychology' or 'dualistic' conceptions is evidence of enduring misunderstandings. It is therefore necessary to remember Wundt's expressly stated desire for uniformity and lack of contradiction, for the mutual supplementation of psychological perspectives. Wundt's more demanding, sometimes more complicated and relativizing, then again very precise style can also be difficult – even for today's German readers; a high level of linguistic competence is required. There are only English translations for very few of Wundt's work. In particular, the Grundzüge der physiologischen Psychologie expanded into three volumes and the ten volumes of Völkerpsychologie, all the books on philosophy and important essays on the theory of science remain untranslated.

Such shortcomings may explain many of the fundamental deficits and lasting misunderstandings in the Anglo-American reception of Wundt's work. Massive misconceptions about Wundt's work have been demonstrated by William James, Granville Stanley Hall, Edward Boring and Edward Titchener as well as among many later authors. Titchener, a two-year resident of Wundt's lab and one of Wundt's most vocal advocates in the United States, is responsible for several English translations and mistranslations of Wundt's works that supported his own views and approach, which he termed "structuralism" and claimed was wholly consistent with Wundt's position.
As Wundt's three-volume Logik und Wissenschaftslehre, i.e. his theory of science, also remains untranslated the close interrelationships between Wundt's empirical psychology and his epistemology and methodology, philosophy and ethics are also regularly missing, even if later collections describe individual facets of them. Blumenthal's assessment that "American textbook accounts of Wundt now present highly inaccurate and mythological caricatures of the man and his work" still appears to be true of most publications about Wundt. A highly contradictory picture emerges from any systematic research on his reception. On the one hand, the pioneer of experimental psychology and founder of modern psychology as a discipline is praised, on the other hand, his work is insufficiently tapped and appears to have had little influence. Misunderstandings and stereotypical evaluations continue into the present, even in some representations of the history of psychology and in textbooks. Wundt's entire work is investigated in a more focused manner in more recent assessments regarding the reception of Wundt, and his theory of science and his philosophy is included (Araujo, 2016; Danziger, 1983, 1990, 2001; Fahrenberg, 2011, 2015, 2016; Jüttemann, 2006; Kim, 2016; van Rappard, 1980).

=== Scientific controversies and criticisms ===
Like other important psychologists and philosophers, Wundt was subject to ideological criticism, for example by authors of a more Christianity-based psychology, by authors with materialistic and positivistic scientific opinions, or from the point-of-view of Marxist-Leninist philosophy and social theory, as in Leipzig, German Democratic Republic, up to 1990. Wundt was involved in a number of scientific controversies or was responsible for triggering them:

- the Wundt-Zeller controversy about the measurability of awareness processes,
- the Wundt-Meumann controversy about the necessary scope of the scientific principles of applied psychology,
- the Wundt-Bühler controversy about the methodology of the psychology of thought,
- the controversy about the psychology of elemental (passive-mechanic) association and integrative (self-active) apperception,
- the controversy about empirio-criticism, positivism and critical realism, and
- the controversy about psychologism.

There are many forms of criticism of Wundt's psychology, of his apperception psychology, of his motivation theory, of his version of psychophysical parallelism with its concept of "mental causality", his refutation of psychoanalytic speculation about the unconscious, or of his critical realism. A recurring criticism is that Wundt largely ignored the areas of psychology that he found less interesting, such as differential psychology, child psychology and educational psychology. In his cultural psychology there is no empirical social psychology because there were still no methods for investigating it at the time. Among his postgraduate students, assistants and other colleagues, however, were several important pioneers: differential psychology, "mental measurement" and intelligence testing (James McKeen Cattell, Charles Spearman), social psychology of group pocesses and the psychology of work (Walther Moede), applied psychology (Ernst Meumann, Hugo Münsterberg), psychopathology, psychopharmacology and clinical diagnosis (Emil Kraepelin). Wundt further influenced many American psychologists to create psychology graduate programs.

== Legacy ==
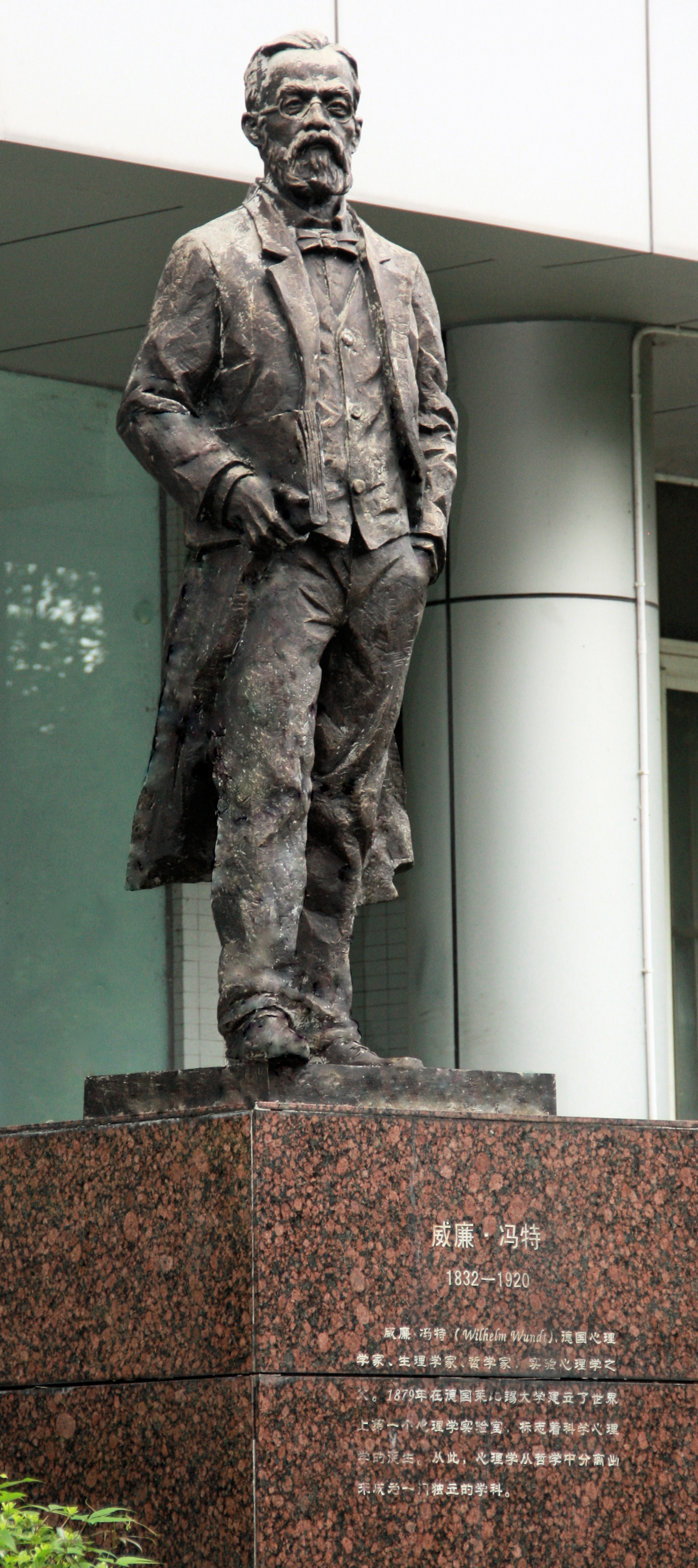
Wilhelm Wundt Southwest University, Chongqing, China

Wundt developed the first comprehensive and uniform theory of the science of psychology. The special epistemological and methodological status of psychology is postulated in this wide-ranging conceptualization, characterized by his neurophysiological, psychological, and philosophical work. The human as a thinking and motivated subject is not to be captured in the terms of the natural sciences. Psychology requires special categories and autonomous epistemological principles. It is, on the one hand, an empirical humanity but should not, on the other hand, ignore its physiological basis and philosophical assumptions. Thus, a varied, multi-method approach is necessary: self-observation, experimentation, generic comparison, and interpretation. Wundt demanded the ability and readiness to distinguish between perspectives and reference systems, and to understand the necessary supplementation of these reference systems in changes of perspective. He defined the field of psychology very widely and as interdisciplinary, and also explained just how indispensable the epistemological-philosophical criticism of psychological theories and their philosophical prerequisites is. Psychology should remain connected with philosophy in order to promote this critique of the knowledge of the metaphysical presuppositions so widespread among psychologists.

The conceptual relationships within the complete works created over decades and continuously reworked have hardly been systematically investigated. The most important theoretical basis is the empirical-psychological theory of apperception, based on Leibniz's philosophical position. Wundt, on the one hand, based on experimental psychology and his neuropsychological modeling, and, on the other hand, extrapolated into a development theory for culture. The fundamental reconstruction of Wundt's main ideas is a task that cannot be achieved by any one person today due to the complexity of the complete works. He tried to connect the fundamental controversies of the research directions epistemologically and methodologically by means of a coordinated concept, in a confident handling of the categorically different ways of considering the interrelations. Here, during the founding phase of university psychology, he already argued for a highly demanding meta-science meta-scientific reflection – and this potential to stimulate interdisciplinarity and perspectivism (complementary approaches) has by no means been exhausted.

== Selected works ==
=== Books and articles ===
- Lehre von der Muskelbewegung (The Patterns of Muscular Movement), (Vieweg, Braunschweig 1858).
- Die Geschwindigkeit des Gedankens (The Velocity of Thought), (Die Gartenlaube 1862, Vol 17, p. 263).
- Beiträge zur Theorie der Sinneswahrnehmung (Contributions on the Theory of Sensory Perception), (Winter, Leipzig 1862).
- Vorlesungen über die Menschen- und Tierseele (Lectures about Human and Animal Psychology), (Voss, Leipzig Part 1 and 2, 1863/1864; 4th revised ed. 1906).
- Lehrbuch der Physiologie des Menschen (Textbook of Human Physiology), (Enke, Erlangen 1864/1865, 4th ed. 1878).
- Die physikalischen Axiome und ihre Beziehung zum Causalprincip (Physical Axioms and their Bearing upon Causality Principles), (Enke, Erlangen 1866).
- Handbuch der medicinischen Physik (Handbook of Medical Physics), (Enke, Erlangen 1867). (Digitalisat und Volltext im Deutschen Textarchiv)
- Untersuchungen zur Mechanik der Nerven und Nervenzentren (Investigations upon the Mechanisms of Nerves and Nerve-Centres), (Enke, Erlangen 1871–1876).
- Grundzüge der physiologischen Psychologie (Principles of physiological Psychology), (Engelmann, Leipzig 1874; 5th ed. 1902–1903; 6th ed. 1908–1911, 3 Vols).
- Über die Aufgabe der Philosophie in der Gegenwart. Rede gehalten zum Antritt des öffentlichen Lehramts der Philosophie an der Hochschule in Zürich am 31. Oktober 1874. (On the Task of Philosophy in the present), (Philosophische Monatshefte. 1874, Vol 11, pp. 65–68).
- Über den Einfluss der Philosophie auf die Erfahrungswissenschaften. Akademische Antrittsrede gehalten in Leipzig am 20. November 1875. (On the Impact of Philosophy on the empirical Sciences), (Engelmann, Leipzig 1876).
- Der Spiritismus – eine sogenannte wissenschaftliche Frage. (Spiritism – a so-called scientific Issue), (Engelmann: Leipzig 1879).
- Logik. Eine Untersuchung der Principien der Erkenntnis und der Methoden wissenschaftlicher Forschung. (Logic. An investigation into the principles of knowledge and the methods of scientific research), (Enke, Stuttgart 1880–1883; 4th ed. 1919–1921, 3 Vols.).
- Ueber die Messung psychischer Vorgänge. (On the measurement of mental events). (Philosophische Studien. 1883, Vol 1, pp. 251–260, pp. 463–471).
- Ueber psychologische Methoden. (On psychological Methods). (Philosophische Studien. 1883, Vol 1, pp. 1–38).
- Essays (Engelmann, Leipzig 1885).
- Ethik. Eine Untersuchung der Tatsachen und Gesetze des sittlichen Lebens. (Ethics), (Enke, Stuttgart 1886; 3rd ed. 1903, 2 Vols.).
- Über Ziele und Wege der Völkerpsychologie. (On Aims and Methods of Cultural Psychology). (Philosophische Studien. 1888, Vol 4, pp. 1–27).
- System der Philosophie (System of Philosophy), (Engelmann, Leipzig 1889: 4th ed. 1919, 2 Vols.).
- Grundriss der Psychologie (Outline of Psychology), (Engelmann, Leipzig 1896; 14th ed. 1920).
- Über den Zusammenhang der Philosophie mit der Zeitgeschichte. Eine Centenarbetrachtung. (On the Relation between Philosophy and contemporary History). Rede des antretenden Rectors Dr. phil., jur. et med. Wilhelm Wundt. F. Häuser (Hrsg.): Die Leipziger Rektoratsreden 1871–1933. Vol I: Die Jahre 1871–1905 (pp. 479–498). Berlin: (de Gruyter (1889/2009).
- Hypnotismus und Suggestion. (Hypnotism and Suggestion). (Engelmann: Leipzig 1892).
- Ueber psychische Causalität und das Princip des psycho-physischen Parallelismus. (On mental Causality and the Principle of psycho-physical Parallelism). (Philosophische Studien. 1894, Vol 10, pp. 1–124).
- Ueber die Definition der Psychologie (On the Definition of Psychology). (Philosophische Studien. 1896, Vol 12, pp. 9–66).
- Über naiven und kritischen Realismus I–III. (On naive and critical Realism). (Philosophische Studien. 1896–1898, Vol 12, pp. 307–408; Vol 13, pp. 1–105, pp. 323–433).
- Völkerpsychologie (Cultural Psychology), 10 Volumes, Vol. 1, 2. Die Sprache (Language); Vol. 3. Die Kunst (Art); Vol 4, 5, 6. Mythos und Religion (Myth and Religion); Vol 7, 8. Die Gesellschaft (Society); Vol 9. Das Recht (Right); Vol 10. Kultur und Geschichte (Culture and History). (Engelmann, Leipzig 1900 to 1920; some vol. revised or reprinted, 3rd ed.1919 ff; 4th ed. 1926).
- Einleitung in die Philosophie (Introduction to Philosophy), (Engelmann, Leipzig 1909; 8th ed. 1920).
- Gustav Theodor Fechner. Rede zur Feier seines hundertjährigen Geburtstags. (Engelmann, Leipzig 1901).
- Über empirische und metaphysische Psychologie (On empirical and metaphysical Psychology). (Archiv für die gesamte Psychologie. 1904, Vol 2, pp. 333–361).
- Über Ausfrageexperimente und über die Methoden zur Psychologie des Denkens. (Psychologische Studien. 1907, Vol 3, pp. 301–360).
- Kritische Nachlese zur Ausfragemethode. (Archiv für die gesamte Psychologie. 1908, Vol 11, pp. 445–459).
- Über reine und angewandte Psychologie (On pure and applied Psychology). (Psychologische Studien. 1909, Vol 5, pp. 1–47).
- Das Institut für experimentelle Psychologie. In: Festschrift zur Feier des 500 jährigen Bestehens der Universität Leipzig, ed. by Rektor und Senat der Universität Leipzig, 1909, 118–133. (S. Hirzel, Leipzig 1909).
- Psychologismus und Logizismus (Psychologism and Logizism). Kleine Schriften. Vol 1 (pp. 511–634). (Engelmann, Leipzig 1910).
- Kleine Schriften (Shorter Writings), 3 Volumes, (Engelmann, Leipzig 1910–1911).
- Einführung in die Psychologie. (Dürr, Leipzig 1911).
- Probleme der Völkerpsychologie (Problems in Cultural Psychology). (Wiegandt, Leipzig 1911).
- Elemente der Völkerpsychologie. Grundlinien einer psychologischen Entwicklungsgeschichte der Menschheit. (Elements of Cultural Psychology), (Kröner, Leipzig 1912).
- Die Psychologie im Kampf ums Dasein (Psychology's Struggle for Existence). (Kröner, Leipzig 1913).
- Reden und Aufsätze. (Addresses and Extracts). (Kröner, Leipzig 1913).
- Sinnliche und übersinnliche Welt (The Sensory and Supersensory World), (Kröner, Leipzig 1914).
- Über den wahrhaften Krieg (About the Real War), (Kröner, Leipzig 1914).
- Die Nationen und ihre Philosophie (Nations and Their Philosophies), (Kröner, Leipzig 1915).
- Völkerpsychologie und Entwicklungspsychologie (Cultural Psychology and Developmental Psychology), (Psychologische Studien. 1916, 10, 189–238).
- Leibniz. Zu seinem zweihundertjährigen Todestag. 14. November 1916. (Kröner Verlag, Leipzig 1917).
- Die Weltkatastrophe und die deutsche Philosophie. (Keysersche Buchhandlung, Erfurt 1920).
- Erlebtes und Erkanntes. (Experience and Realization). (Kröner, Stuttgart 1920).
- Kleine Schriften. Vol 3. (Kröner, Stuttgart 1921).

=== Wundt's works in English ===
Adapted from the list of references given by Alan Kim Wilhelm Maximilian Wundt.

- 1974 The Language of Gestures. Ed. Blumenthal, A.L. Berlin: De Gruyter
- 1916 An Introduction to Psychology. Tr. Rudolf Pintner, New York: MacMillan & London: George Allen. Reprinted 2016 New York: Arno Press. (Translation of the 2nd [1911] edition of Einführung in die Psychologie. Leipzig: Engelmann.)
- 1916 Elements of Folk Psychology. Tr. Schaub, E.L. London: Allen (idem)
- 1901 The Principles of Morality and the Departments of the Moral Life. Trans. Washburn, M.F. London: Swan Sonnenschein; New York: Macmillan
- 1897 Outlines of Psychology. Tr. Judd, C.H. Leipzig: Wilhelm Engelmann. (Translation of Grundriss der Psychologie, 1896)
  - 1902 Second Revised English Edition, from the Fourth Revised German Edition [of 1901].
- 1896 (2nd ed.) Lectures on human and animal psychology. Creighton, J.G., Titchener, E.B., trans. London: Allen. Translation of Wundt, 1863
- 1893 (3rd ed.) Principles of physiological psychology. Titchener, E.B., trans. London: Allen. Translation of Wundt, 1874. [New York, 1904]

== See also ==
- Anti-psychologism

== Sources ==
=== Biographies ===
- Rieber, R. ed., 2013. Wilhelm Wundt and the making of a scientific psychology. Springer Science & Business Media.
- Alfred Arnold: Wilhelm Wundt – Sein philosophisches System. Akademie-Verlag, Berlin 1980.
- Edwin G. Boring: A history of experimental psychology (2nd ed.) The Century Company, New York 1950.
- Arthur L. Blumenthal: Wundt, Wilhelm. Dictionary of Scientific Biography. 25. Charles, New York (1970–1980).
- Bringmann, Wolfgang G.; Balance, W. D.; Evans, R. B. (1975). "Wilhelm Wundt 1832–1920: a brief biographical sketch". Journal of the History of the Behavioral Sciences. 11 (3): 287–297. doi:10.1002/1520-6696(197507)11:3<287::AID-JHBS2300110309>3.0.CO;2-L. PMID 11609842.
- Rudolf Eisler: W. Wundts Philosophie und Psychologie. In ihren Grundlehren dargestellt. Barth, Leipzig 1902.
- Granville Stanley Hall: Founders of modern psychology. Appleton, New York 1912 (Wilhelm Wundt. Der Begründer der modernen Psychologie. Vorwort von Max Brahn. Meiner, Leipzig 1914).
- Alan Kim: "Wilhelm Maximilian Wundt". The Stanford Encyclopedia of Philosophy (Fall 2016 Edition), Edward N. Zalta (ed.).Wilhelm Maximilian Wundt
- Edmund König: Wilhelm Wundt als Psycholog und als Philosoph. Fromman, Stuttgart 1901.
- Georg Lamberti: Wilhelm Maximilian Wundt (1832–1920). Leben, Werk und Persönlichkeit in Bildern und Texten. Deutscher Psychologen Verlag, Berlin 1995, ISBN 3-925559-83-3.
- Wolfram Meischner, Erhard Eschler: Wilhelm Wundt. Pahl-Rugenstein, Köln 1979, ISBN 3-7609-0457-2.
- Willi Nef: Die Philosophie Wilhelm Wundts. Meiner, Leipzig 1923.
- Traugott K. Oesterreich: (1923/1951). Grundriss der Geschichte der Philosophie. IV. Die Deutsche Philosophie des Neunzehnten Jahrhunderts und der Gegenwart (15. Aufl., 1951, unveränd. Nachdr. der völlig neubearb. 12. Aufl.). Mittler & Sohn, Tübingen 1923, pp. 343–360, 483–485.
- Peter Petersen: Wilhelm Wundt und seine Zeit. Frommanns Verlag, Stuttgart 1925.
- Lothar Sprung: Wilhelm Wundt – Bedenkenswertes und Bedenkliches aus seinem Lebenswerk. In: Georg Eckardt (Hrsg.): Zur Geschichte der Psychologie. Deutscher Verlag der Wissenschaften, Berlin 1979, pp. 73–82.
- Eleonore Wundt: Wilhelm Wundt. Deutsches Biographisches Jahrbuch (hrsg. vom Verband der Deutschen Akademien). Deutsche Verlagsanstalt, Berlin 1928. Überleitungsband II, 1917–1920, pp. 626–636.

=== Contemporary sources ===
- Eduard von Hartmann: Die moderne Psychologie. Eine kritische Geschichte der deutschen Psychologie in der zweiten Hälfte des neunzehnten Jahrhunderts. Haacke, Leipzig 1901.
- Arthur Hoffmann-Erfurt (Hrsg.): Wilhelm Wundt. Eine Würdigung. (1. Aufl. 1922, 2. verm. Aufl. 1924). Stenger, Erfurt 1924.
- Edmund König: W. Wundt. Seine Philosophie und Psychologie. F. Frommann, Stuttgart 1901.
- Festschrift. Wilhelm Wundt zum siebzigsten Geburtstage. Überreicht von seinen Schülern. 1. Theil. (= Philosophische Studien. 19. Band), Wilhelm Engelmann, Leipzig 1902.
- Festschrift. Wilhelm Wundt zum siebzigsten Geburtstage. Überreicht von seinen Schülern. 2. Theil. (= Philosophische Studien. 20. Band), Wilhelm Engelmann, Leipzig 1902.
- Woolf Cohen: Knowledge and Reality in the Philosophy of Wilhelm Max Wundt. Unpublished Ph.D. thesis at Cornell University, Ithaca, NY 1923.
- Otto Klemm: Zur Geschichte des Leipziger Psychologischen Instituts. In: A. Hoffmann-Erfurt (Hrsg.): Wilhelm Wundt. Eine Würdigung. 2. Auflage. Stenger, Erfurt 1924, pp. 93–101.
- Felix Krueger: Eröffnung des XIII. Kongresses. Die Lage der Seelenwissenschaft in der deutschen Gegenwart. In: Otto Klemm (Hrsg.): Bericht über den XIII. Kongress der Deutschen Gesellschaft für Psychologie in Leipzig vom 16.–19. Oktober 1933. Fischer, Jena 1934, pp. 6–36.
- Leonore Wundt: Wilhelm Wundts Werke. Ein Verzeichnis seiner sämtlichen Schriften. Beck, München, 1927.

=== Recent sources ===
- Araujo, Saulo de Freitas (2012). "Why did Wundt abandon his early theory of the unconscious? Towards a new interpretation of Wundt's psychological project". History of Psychology. 15 (1): 33–49. doi:10.1037/a0024478. PMID 22530377.
- Saulo de F. Araujo: Wundt and the Philosophical Foundations of Psychology. A Reappraisal. Springer, New York 2016, ISBN 978-3-319-26634-3.
- Arthur L. Blumenthal: Leipzig, Wilhelm Wundt, and psychology's gilded age. In: G.A. Kimble, M. Wertheimer, M. (Eds.). Portraits of pioneers in psychology. Vol. III. American Psychological Association, Washington, D.C. 1998.
- Bringmann, Wolfgang G.; Scheerer, Eckart (1980). "Preface". Psychological Research. 42 (1–2): i-4. doi:10.1007/BF00308687.
- Wolfgang G. Bringmann, N. J. Bringmann, W. D. Balance: Wilhelm Maximilian Wundt 1832 – 1874: The formative years. In: W.G. Bringmann, R. D. Tweney (Eds.). Wundt studies. A centennial Collection. Hogrefe, Toronto 1980, pp. 12–32.
- Wolfgang G. Bringmann, Ryan D. Tweney (Eds.): Wundt studies. Hogrefe, Toronto 1980, ISBN 0-88937-001-X.
- Wolfgang G. Bringmann, N. J. Bringmann, G. A. Ungerer: The establishment of Wundt's laboratory: An archival and documentary study. In: Wolfgang Bringmann, Ryan D. Tweney (Eds.): Wundt Studies. Hogrefe, Toronto 1980, ISBN 0-88937-001-X, pp. 123–157.
- Danziger, Kurt (1979). "The positivist repudiation of Wundt". Journal of the History of the Behavioral Sciences. 15 (3): 205–230. doi:10.1002/1520-6696(197907)15:3<205::AID-JHBS2300150303>3.0.CO;2-P. PMID 11608280.
- Kurt Danziger: On the threshold of the New Psychology: Situating Wundt and James. In: W.G. Bringmann, E. D. Tweney (Eds.). Wundt Studies. A Centennial Collection. Hogrefe, Toronto, 1980, pp. 362–379.
- Danziger, Kurt (1990). Constructing the Subject. doi:10.1017/CBO9780511524059. ISBN 978-0-521-36358-7.
- Danziger, Kurt (2001). "Wundt and the Temptations of Psychology". Wilhelm Wundt in History. Path in Psychology. pp. 69–94. doi:10.1007/978-1-4615-0665-2_2. ISBN 978-1-4613-5184-9.
- Georg Eckardt (Ed.): Völkerpsychologie - Versuch einer Neuentdeckung. Psychologie Verlags Union, Weinheim 1997.
- Jochen Fahrenberg: Wilhelm Wundt - Pionier der Psychologie und Außenseiter? Leitgedanken der Wissenschaftskonzeption und deren Rezeptionsgeschichte. (Wilhelm Wundt – pioneer in psychology and outsider? Basic concepts and their reception) e-book, 2011. PsyDok ZPID Wilhelm Wundt — Pionier der Psychologie und Außenseiter? Leitgedanken der Wissenschaftskonzeption und deren Rezeptionsgeschichte
- Fahrenberg, Jochen (2012). "Wilhelm Wundts Wissenschaftstheorie der Psychologie". Psychologische Rundschau. 63 (4): 228–238. doi:10.1026/0033-3042/a000141.
- Jochen Fahrenberg: Zur Kategorienlehre der Psychologie. Komplementaritätsprinzip. Perspektiven und Perspektiven-Wechsel.(On categories in psychology. Complementarity principle, perspectives, and perspective-taking). Pabst Science Publishers, Lengerich 2013, ISBN 978-3-89967-891-8. PsyDok ZPID Wilhelm Wundt — Pionier der Psychologie und Außenseiter? Leitgedanken der Wissenschaftskonzeption und deren Rezeptionsgeschichte
- Jochen Fahrenberg: Theoretische Psychologie – Eine Systematik der Kontroversen (Theoretical psychology – A system of controversies). Lengerich: Pabst Science Publishers, Lengerich 2015a. ISBN 978-3-95853-077-5. PsyDok ZPID Theoretische Psychologie – Eine Systematik der Kontroversen
- Jochen Fahrenberg: Wilhelm Wundts Neuropsychologie (Wilhelm Wundt's neuropsychology). D. Emmans & A. Laihinen (Eds.). Comparative Neuropsychology and Brain Imaging: Commemorative publication in honour of Prof. Dr. Ulrike Halsband. LIT-Verlag, Vienna 2015b, ISBN 978-3-643-90653-3. pp. 348–373.
- Fahrenberg, Jochen (2016). "Leibniz' Einfluss auf Wundts Psychologie und Philosophie". Psychologische Rundschau. 67 (4): 276. doi:10.1026/0033-3042/a000332.
- Jochen Fahrenberg: Wilhelm Wundts Kulturpsychologie (Völkerpsychologie): Eine Psychologische Entwicklungstheorie des Geistes (Wilhelm Wundt's cultural psychology: A psychological theory on the development of mind). (2016b) PsyDok Wilhelm Wundts Kulturpsychologie (Völkerpsychologie): Eine Psychologische Entwicklungstheorie des Geistes
- Jochen Fahrenberg: Wundt-Nachlass (2016c). PsyDok ZPID Wilhelm Wundts Nachlass. Eine Übersicht.
- Jochen Fahrenberg: Wilhelm Wundt (1832–1920). Gesamtwerk: Einführung, Zitate, Rezeption, Kommentare, Rekonstruktionsversuche. Pabst Science Publishers, Lengerich 2018. ISBN 978-3-95853-435-3. PsyDok ZPID Wilhelm Wundt (1832–1920). Gesamtwerk: Einführung, Zitate, Kommentare, Rezeption, Rekonstruktionsversuche.
- Jochen Fahrenberg: Wilhelm Wundt (1832–1920). Introduction, Quotations, Reception, Commentaries, Attempts at Reconstruction. Pabst Science Publishers, Lengerich 2020. ISBN 978-3-95853-574-9. PsyDok ZPID Wilhelm Wundt (1832–1920). Introduction, Quotations, Reception, Commentaries, Attempts at Reconstruction.
- Jochen Fahrenberg: Wilhelm Wundt (1832–1920). Eine Centenarbetrachtung (Ein Rückblick auf das Werk von Wilhelm Wundt und dessen Rezeption und Aktualität.) https://doi.org/10.23668/psycharchives.5580 (PDF; 1,09 MB). 2022.
- Graumann, Carl F. (1980). "Experiment, Statistik, Geschichte. Wundts erstes Heidelberger Programm einer Psychologie". Psychologische Rundschau. 31: 73–83.
- Carl F. Graumann: Die Verbindung und Wechselwirkung der Individuen im Gemeinschaftsleben. In: Gerd Jüttemann (Ed.): Wilhelm Wundts anderes Erbe. Ein Missverständnis löst sich auf. Vandenhoeck & Ruprecht, Göttingen 2006, pp. 52–68.
- Hildebrandt, H. (1989). Psychophysischer Parallelismus. In: J. Ritte, K. Gründer (Hrsg.). Historisches Wörterbuch der Philosophie. Wissenschaftliche Buchgesellschaft, Darmstadt 1989, Volume 7, pp. 101–107.
- Willem Van Hoorn, T. Verhave: Wilhelm Wundts"s conception of his multiple foundations of scientific psychology. In W. Meischner, A. Metge (Hrsg.). Wilhelm Wundt – progressives Erbe, Wissenschaftsentwicklung und Gegenwart. Protokoll des internationalen Symposiums. Karl-Marx-Universität Leipzig, 1979. Pahl-Rugenstein, Köln 1980, pp. 107–117.
- Jürgen Jahnke: Wilhelm Wundts akademische Psychologie 1886/87. Die Vorlesungsnachschriften von Albert Thumb Freiburg. In: Jürgen Jahnke, Jochen Fahrenberg, Reiner Stegie, Eberhard Bauer (Hrsg.): Psychologiegeschichte – Beziehungen zu Philosophie und Grenzgebieten. Profil, München 1998, ISBN 3-89019-461-3, pp. 151–168.
- Gerd Jüttemann (Ed.): Wilhelm Wundts anderes Erbe. Ein Missverständnis löst sich auf. Vandenhoeck & Ruprecht, Göttingen, 2006, ISBN 3-525-49087-9.
- Alan Kim: "Wilhelm Maximilian Wundt". The Stanford Encyclopedia of Philosophy (Fall 2016 Edition), Edward N. Zalta (ed.)Wilhelm Maximilian Wundt
- Friedrich A. Lange: Geschichte des Materialismus und Kritik seiner Bedeutung in der Gegenwart. (8. erw. Aufl. 1908, hrsg. und bearbeitet von Hermann Cohen). Baedeker, Iserlohn 1866.
- Wolfram Meischner, Anneros Metge: Wilhelm Wundt – progressives Erbe, Wissenschaftsentwicklung und Gegenwart. Protokoll des internationalen Symposiums. Karl-Marx-Universität, Leipzig 1979. Pahl-Rugenstein, Köln 1980.
- Anneros Meischner-Metge: Wilhelm Wundt und seine Schüler. In: Horst-Peter Brauns (Ed.): Zentenarbetrachtungen. Historische Entwicklungen in der neueren Psychologie bis zum Ende des 20. Jahrhunderts. Peter Lang, Frankfurt a.M. 2003, pp. 156–166.
- Anneros Meischner-Metge: Die Methode der Forschung. In: G. Jüttemann (Hrsg.): Wilhelm Wundts anderes Erbe. Ein Missverständnis löst sich auf. Vandenhoeck & Ruprecht, Göttingen 2006, pp. 131–143.
- Till Meyer: Das DFG-Projekt "Erschließung und Digitalisierung des Nachlasses von Wilhelm Wundt" an der Universitätsbibliothek Leipzig. In: Leipziger Jahrbuch für Buchgeschichte, 2015, Volume 23, pp. 347–357.
- Rappard, H. V. (1980). "A monistic interpretation of Wundt's psychology". Psychological Research. 42 (1–2): 123–134. doi:10.1007/BF00308697. S2CID 143838892.
- Robert W. Rieber, David K. Robinson (Eds.): Wilhelm Wundt in history: The making of a scientific psychology. Kluwer-Academic, New York 1980 (2nd ed. 2001).
- Eckhard Scheerer: Psychologie. In: J. Ritter, K. Gründer (Hrsg.). Historisches Wörterbuch der Philosophie. Schwabe & Co., Basel 1989, Volume 7 (pp. 1599–1654).
- Ungerer, Gustav A. (1980). "Wilhelm Wundt als Psychologe und Politiker". Psychologische Rundschau. 31: 99–110.
- Gustav A. Ungerer: Forschungen zur Biographie Wilhelm Wundts und zur Regionalgeschichte. Gesammelte Aufsätze 1978–1997. Ein Logbuch. Verlag Regionalkultur, Ubstadt-Weiher 2016. ISBN 978-3-89735-851-5
- Wong, Wan-chi (2009). "Retracing the footsteps of Wilhelm Wundt: Explorations in the disciplinary frontiers of psychology and in Völkerpsychologie". History of Psychology. 12 (4): 229–265. doi:10.1037/a0017711. PMID 20509352.
- Maximilian Wontorra: Frühe apparative Psychologie. Der Andere Verlag, Leipzig 2009.
- Maximilian Wontorra, Ingrid Kästner, Erich Schröger (Hrsg.): Wilhelm Wundts Briefwechsel. Institut für Psychologie. Leipzig 2011.
- Maximilian Wontorra, Anneros Meischner-Metge, Erich Schröger (Hrsg.): Wilhelm Wundt (1832–1920) und die Anfänge der experimentellen Psychologie. Institut für Psychologie. Leipzig 2004. ISBN 3-00-013477-8.
- Ziche, P (1999). "Neuroscience in its context. Neuroscience and psychology in the work of Wilhelm Wundt". Physis Riv Int Stor Sci. 36 (2): 407–29. PMID 11640242..
- Paul Ziche: Wissenschaftslandschaften um 1900: Philosophie, die Wissenschaften und der nichtreduktive Szientismus. Chronos, Zürich 2008.
