= Heterogony of ends =

The "heterogony of ends" is a famous expression formulated in 1886 by German psychologist Wilhelm Wundt, to denote the phenomenon of how goal-directed activities often cause experiences that modify the original motivational pattern.

This principle is exemplified by the emergence of new motives during the course of a chain of activities. For example, one may accept the invitation of a friend to attend an art show. Initially, the motive is simply the anticipation of a pleasant evening in good friendship, but in the course of the evening, one encounters a highly desirable work of art and wishes to purchase it. A whole new set of motives now enters the picture and now exist alongside and in addition to the original motive. The Heterogony of Ends formulates that an ongoing behavioral sequence must often be understood in terms of ever-shifting patterns of primary and secondary goals. Another example would be how a cat chasing a mouse may suddenly find it necessary to compete with a partner, overcome an unexpected barrier, or avoid a danger. Ends, goals, and purposes continue to change.

The original German expression was Heterogonie der Zwecke, variously translated in English as heterogony/heterogeneity/heterogenesis of ends/goals/purposes. It was first formulated by Wundt in 1886, in his book Ethics.

Additionally, the Italian philosopher Giambattista Vico is sometimes credited as having anticipated and influenced Wundt's idea.

== See also ==
- Overjustification effect – Psychological phenomenon
