= Robert Morris Ogden =

American psychologist and academic

- Born: July 6, 1877; Binghamton, New York, US
- Died: March 2, 1959 (aged 81); Ithaca, New York, US
- Education: Cornell University; University of Würzburg
- Occupation: Psychologist
- Spouse: Nellie Dorsey
- Children: 1 son, 2 daughters

Robert Morris Ogden (1877–1959) was an American psychologist and academic. He served as the dean of the Cornell University College of Arts and Sciences from 1923 to 1945. He was the first proponent of Gestalt psychology in the United States.

== Early life ==
Robert Morris Ogden was born on July 6, 1877, in Binghamton, New York. His father was James Sherman Ogden and his mother, Beulah Maria Carter.

Ogden was educated in public schools in Binghamton. He graduated from Cornell University with a bachelor of science degree in psychology in 1901. While he was at Cornell, one of his professors was Edward B. Titchener. It was the latter who suggested he do a PhD in psychology under the supervision of Oswald Külpe, a long-time friend of Titchener's. As a result, Ogden enrolled at the University of Würzburg, from which he received a PhD in 1903.

== Career ==
Upon completion of his PhD, he returned to the United States and served as Max Friedrich Meyer's assistant at the University of Missouri from 1903 to 1905. Ogden became assistant professor of psychology at the University of Tennessee from 1905 to 1907, where he went on to serve as associate professor from 1907 to 1909, and full professor from 1909 to 1914. In 1916, he became the chair of the Department of Psychology at the University of Kansas, thanks to James Rowland Angell.

Shortly after, Ogden became chair of the Department of Education at his alma mater, Cornell University, where he taught until his death in 1959. Meanwhile, Ogden was a Visiting Lecturer at the Harvard Graduate School of Education in spring 1923. From 1923 to 1945, he was the dean of the Cornell University College of Arts and Sciences.

According to University of Texas at Austin psychology professor Karl M. Dallenbach, "Ogden was the first and principal proponent of Gestalt psychology in America." Similarly, in his review of Ogden's 1926 Psychology and education, D. T. Howard, a professor of psychology at Northwestern University, called Ogden's use of Gestalt psychology "a pioneer work." As Dean, he invited German-born psychologists Kurt Koffka, Wolfgang Köhler, and Kurt Lewin to teach at Cornell.

Ogden served as the sixth president of the Southern Society for Philosophy and Psychology in 1913. He served as the Secretary-Treasurer of the American Psychological Association from 1913 to 1916, and on its Council from 1918 to 1920. He also served as the chairman of section 1 of the American Association for the Advancement of Science in 1936. Additionally, he served as the president of the Association of Colleges and Universities for the State of New York from 1936 to 1938. He was a member of Phi Beta Kappa, Sigma Xi, Phi Kappa Phi, Phi Delta Kappa, and Psi Chi. Ogden was a cooperating editor of Psychological Bulletin from 1909 to 1929, and of the American Journal of Psychology from 1926 to 1959.

== Personal life ==
Ogden married Nellie Dorsey in 1905. They had a son, Jonathon Ogden, and two daughters, Mrs Stewart Hemingway and Mrs Frederick S. Brown.

== Death ==
He died of carcinoma of the pancreas on March 2, 1959, at the Tompkins County Memorial Hospital in Ithaca, New York.

== Works ==
- An introduction to general psychology (1914)
- Hearing (1924)
- Psychology and education (1926)
- The psychology of art (1938)
