= Mentalism (psychology) =

Once-antagonistic term for the study of mental perception and thought processes

In psychology, mentalism refers to those branches of study that concentrate on perception and thought processes, for example: mental imagery, consciousness and cognition, as in cognitive psychology. The term mentalism has been used primarily by behaviorists who believe that scientific psychology should focus on the structure of causal relationships to reflexes and operant responses or on the functions of behavior.

Neither mentalism nor behaviorism are mutually exclusive fields; elements of one can be seen in the other, perhaps more so in modern times compared to the advent of psychology over a century ago.

== Classical mentalism ==
Psychologist Allan Paivio used the term classical mentalism to refer to the introspective psychologies of Edward Titchener and William James. Despite Titchener being concerned with structure and James with function, both agreed that consciousness was the subject matter of psychology, making psychology an inherently subjective field.

== The rise of behaviorism ==
Concurrently thriving alongside mentalism since the inception of psychology was the functional perspective of behaviorism. However, it was not until 1913, when psychologist John B. Watson published his article "Psychology as the Behaviorist Views It" that behaviorism began to have a dominant influence. Watson's ideas sparked what some have called a paradigm shift in American psychology, emphasizing the objective and experimental study of human behavior, rather than subjective, introspective study of human consciousness. Behaviorists considered that the study of consciousness was impossible to do, or unnecessary, and that the focus on it to that point had only been a hindrance to the field reaching its full potential. For a time, behaviorism would go on to be a dominant force driving psychological research, advanced by the work of scholars including Ivan Pavlov, Edward Thorndike, Watson, and especially B.F. Skinner.

== The new mentalism ==
Critical to the successful revival of the mind or consciousness as a primary focus of study in psychology (and in related fields such as cognitive neuroscience) were technological and methodological advances, which eventually allowed for brain mapping, among other new techniques. These advances provided an experimental way to begin to study perception and consciousness.

However, the cognitive revolution did not kill behaviorism as a research program; in fact, research on operant conditioning actually grew at a rapid pace during the cognitive revolution. In 1994, scholar Terry L. Smith surveyed the history of radical behaviorism and concluded that "even though radical behaviorism may have been a failure, the operant program of research has been a success. Furthermore, operant psychology and cognitive psychology complement one another, each having its own domain within which it contributes something valuable to, but beyond the reach of, the other."

== See also ==
- Cartesianism
- Cognitivism (psychology)
- Dualism (philosophy of mind)
- Property dualism
