= John Wallace Baird =

Canadian psychologist (1869–1919)

John Wallace Baird (/bɜːrd/; May 21, 1869 – February 2, 1919) was a Canadian psychologist. He was the 27th president of the American Psychological Association (1918). He was the first Canadian, and only the second non-American, to hold the office. He was also a founding editor of the Journal of Applied Psychology, and served in subordinate editorial capacities for Psychological Review, American Journal of Psychology, and the Journal of Educational Psychology. At his death in 1919, he was the designate to succeed Granville Stanley Hall as president of Clark University in Worcester, Massachusetts.

== Early life ==
John W. Baird was born in Motherwell, Ontario, a farming town about 50 km. north of the city of London, Ontario. He was the eighth of twelve children. His oldest brother, Andrew Browning Baird (1855–1940) became a prominent Presbyterian minister in western Canada, serving as Moderator of the church in 1916, and was involved in the creation of the United Church of Canada in the 1925.

John Baird suffered from chronic health conditions from early in life and, so, did not complete his secondary schooling until the age of 19. Only five years later did he travel to the University of Toronto to begin an undergraduate degree in philosophy. There, he fell under the influence of the director of the experimental psychology laboratory, August Kirschmann, who had just arrived in Toronto after serving as assistant to the man widely regarded as the founder of experimental psychology, Wilhelm Wundt, in Leipzig, Germany. Baird graduated with a second class degree in 1897, writing his senior research project on the anomalous color vision of a fellow student, R. J. Richardson (Baird & Richardson, 1900).

== Graduate training ==
After spending an additional year in Toronto working in Kirschmann's laboratory, Baird traveled to Europe for graduate study. He spent several months each at the University of Edinburgh and at the University of Leipzig (where he was briefly a student of Wundt's). In 1899, however, he moved to the U.S. to begin his graduate studies anew at the University of Wisconsin under the supervision of Joseph Jastrow. Two years later, still without a PhD, Baird transferred to Cornell University in Ithaca, New York where he studied under the famed structuralist psychologist, Edward Bradford Titchener. Here Baird found his stride, completing his PhD in just a year (1902). His dissertation was on the impact of visual accommodation and convergence on depth perception. It was published in the American Journal of Psychology (Baird, 1903). He remained at Cornell for two more years, one as Titchener's research assistant and one as a research fellow of the recently founded Carnegie Institution. These were among Baird's most productive years as a researcher (Baird, 1905). In 1904 he was elected to membership in the prestigious American Association for the Advancement of Science. In addition, the strong relationship Baird formed with Titchener during this time deeply influenced the rest of his career.

== Academic career ==
Baird worked as an instructor in psychology at Johns Hopkins University, under the direction of the child psychologist and evolutionist James Mark Baldwin from 1904 to 1906. He was then hired to a position at the University of Illinois which, after a year, became an assistant professorship. The Illinois psychology department was headed by an educational psychologist, Stephen S. Colvin. It was here that Baird's research interests began to spread from the "pure" experimental psychology that was advocated by Titchener into areas of applied psychology (Baird, 1906, 1908).

In 1909, Baird was called to direct the storied psychology laboratory at Clark University. Clark's president, the prominent psychologist G. Stanley Hall, wanted Baird to replace Hall's long-time ally, Edmund C. Sanford, who was being promoted to the presidency of the new undergraduate college at Clark. Baird had just become a cooperating editor of the newly founded Journal of Educational Psychology, and Hall put him to work as executive editor of his own American Journal of Psychology. Baird spent much of 1912 touring the psychology laboratories of Germany, France, Switzerland, and England in order to bring the latest developments back to the Clark laboratory. He also translated Ernst Meumann's Psychology of Learning (Meumann, 1913). Baird underwent surgery in 1913 to correct a urinary tract condition, which forced him to spend several months in hospital.

In 1914, Baird married Barbara Morrison Sparks, the daughter of a physician in St. Marys, Ontario. In 1916 Baird was elected to membership in the venerable American Academy of Arts and Sciences. The duties of being laboratory director prevented Baird from conducting much original research during this period, but he was able to co-edit and contribute a chapter on perfect pitch to a Festschrift celebrating Titchener's 25th year at Cornell (Baird, 1917a). He also contributed a chapter (Baird, 1917b) to another Festschrift in honor of the retirement of Cornell philosophy professor James Edwin Creighton, who had been the founding president of the American Philosophical Association (and was a fellow Canadian). Also in 1917, Hall, Baird, and another Clark professor named Ludwig R. Geissler collectively founded a new periodical, the Journal of Applied Psychology. Baird published an article based on research he had conducted into the optimal type-font to be used in telephone books in the first volume (Baird, 1917c).

Around 1917 Baird became aware that Hall was grooming him to succeed both Hall and Sanford as president of a newly unified Clark College and Clark University upon their joint retirement in 1920. In 1918, during World War I, Baird was elected president of the American Psychological Association. During his term he was called to Washington D.C. to serve as Vice-Chair of the National Research Council's Psychological Committee, a position in which he developed a program for the assessment and rehabilitation of injured soldiers returning from the war.

== Illness and death ==
In November 1918, Baird became seriously ill and entered Johns Hopkins Hospital in nearby Baltimore, Maryland. Although it is not clear what his medical problem was (it may have been a recurrence of the renal condition that had periodically afflicted him since his youth), he underwent three surgeries over the next few months. He died of unspecified post-surgical complications on February 2, 1919 at the age of 49. He was buried in St. Marys, Ontario, near his family home of Motherwell, Ontario.

== Selected publications ==
- Baird, J. W. (1903). The influence of accommodation and convergence on the perception of depth. American Journal of Psychology, 14, 150–200.
- Baird, J. W. (1905). The color sensitivity of the peripheral retina. Washington, DC: Carnegie Institution.
- Baird, J. W. (1906). The contraction of the color zones in hysteria and in neurasthenia. Psychological Bulletin, 3, 249–254.
- Baird, J. W. (1908). The problems of color-blindness. Psychological Bulletin, 5 (9), 294–300.
- Baird, J. W. (1917a). Memory for absolute pitch. In W. B. Pillsbury, & J. W. Baird, Studies in Psychology: Titchener Commemorative Volume (pp. 43–78). Worcester, MA: Wilson.
- Baird, J. W. (1917b). The role of intent in mental functioning. In G. H. Sabine (Ed.), Philosophical essays in honor of James Edwin Creighton (pp. 307–317). New York: Macmillan.
- Baird, J. W. (1917c). The legibility of a telephone directory. Journal of Applied Psychology, 1 (1), 30–37.
- Baird, J. W. & Richardson, R. J. (1900). A case of abnormal colour sense, examined with special reference to the space threshold of colours. University of Toronto Studies, Psychological Series, 1, 86–96.
- Meumann, E. (1913). The psychology of learning: An experimental investigation of the economy and technique of memory (J. W. Baird, trans.). New York, NY: Appleton & Company.
