= James Rowland Angell =

American psychologist and educator (1869–1949)

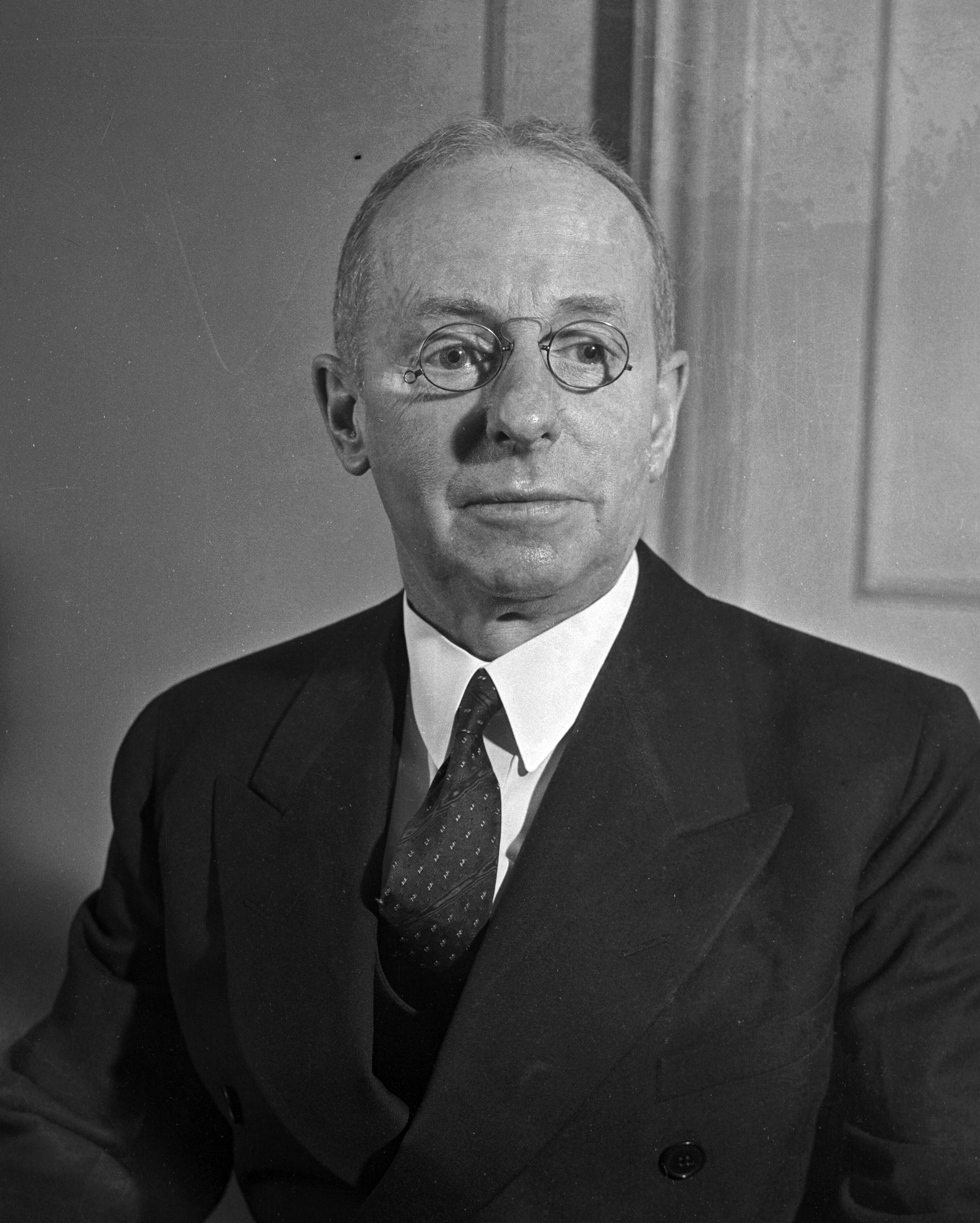
- Angell, circa 1920–1939

14th President of Yale University
- In office 1921–1937
- Preceded by: Arthur Twining Hadley
- Succeeded by: Charles Seymour

Personal details
- Born: May 8, 1869 Burlington, Vermont, U.S.
- Died: March 4, 1949 (aged 79) Hamden, Connecticut, U.S.
- Spouse(s): Marion Isabel Watrous (m. 1894; died 1931) Katharine Cramer Woodman (m. 1932)
- Children: James Waterhouse Angell
- Education: University of Michigan (BA, MA); Harvard University (MA)
- Scientific career
- Fields: Psychology
- Workplaces: Yale University; University of Chicago; University of Minnesota
- Doctoral students: John B. Watson

James Rowland Angell (/ˈeɪndʒəl/; May 8, 1869 – March 4, 1949) was an American psychologist and educator who served as the 16th President of Yale University between 1921 and 1937. His father, James Burrill Angell (1829–1916), was president of the University of Vermont from 1866 to 1871 and then the University of Michigan from 1871 to 1909.

== Biography ==
=== Early life and education ===
Angell was born on May 8, 1869, in Burlington, Vermont. He was born into one of the stellar academic families in American history. A sixth-generation descendant of Thomas Angell who settled Providence, Rhode Island, James's father, James Burrill Angell, was the president of the University of Vermont and thence president of the University of Michigan. He was the youngest of three children, with an older brother and sister. When Angell was two years old, his family moved to Ann Arbor so that his father could take up the presidency of the University of Michigan. His maternal grandfather, Alexis Caswell, was a professor of mathematics and astronomy at Brown University, later becoming its president. He was also a charter member of the National Academy of Sciences. His brother Alexis C. Angell became a professor of law of Michigan, and later a federal judge. His sister's husband, Andrew C. McLaughlin, was head of the history department at Michigan. His cousin, Frank Angell, founded psychology laboratories at Cornell and Stanford Universities.

Angell graduated from the University of Michigan with his bachelor's degree in 1890. He worked closely with John Dewey, earning a master's degree in philosophy under his supervision in 1891. At Michigan he was a member of Delta Kappa Epsilon fraternity (Omicron chapter). He then went to Harvard University where he received a second master's degree in 1892 in psychology. He studied for a doctorate in philosophy in Berlin and Halle. His dissertation on the treatment of freedom in Kant was accepted, but required stylistic changes, which he never completed. Instead, he decided to take up a post at the University of Minnesota. He did, however, receive 23 honorary degrees during his lifetime.

=== Career ===
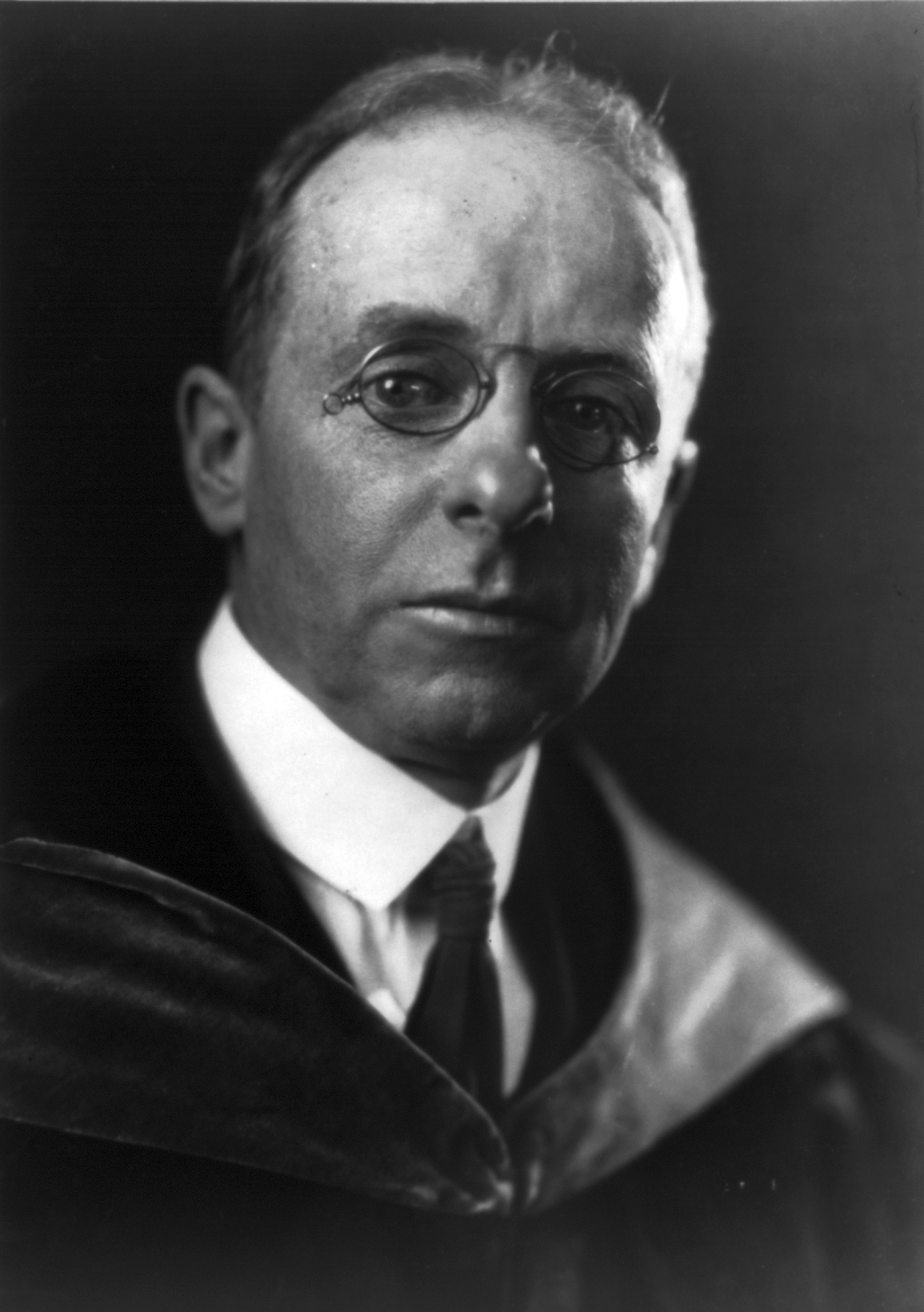
Portrait of Angell

In 1895, Angell was offered a position at the University of Chicago by John Dewey, who had moved from Michigan the year before. Almost immediately, he co-authored an article with his Chicago colleague Addison W. Moore that simultaneously settled a nasty dispute between Cornell psychologist Edward Bradford Titchener and Princeton psychologist James Mark Baldwin as well as laying the foundations for the school of Functionalism. Later, while still at Chicago, Angell published the textbook Psychology; An Introductory Study of the Structure and Functions of Human Consciousness in 1904, which became the major statement of the functionalist approach to psychology. Angell noted that the goal of psychology was to study how the mind helps the organism adjust to the environment and functionalism was a method in which to study consciousness and how it improves the organism relationship with the environment. In 1905 (the year after Dewey left Chicago for Columbia University), Angell became the head of the newly created psychology department at Chicago. During this time he served as the 15th and youngest president of the American Psychological Association. He also supervised the young John B. Watson, who would later go on to found the behaviorist school of psychology. In 1908, Angell was raised to the level of Dean at Chicago, leaving the psychology department to another of his former students, Harvey Carr. During the last year of World War I Angell worked for the military under the supervision of Northwestern University psychologist Walter Dill Scott. The following year (1918), he returned to Chicago to serve as Acting President. The school would not make him president on a permanent basis, however, because he was not Baptist. In 1919 he left Chicago to head the National Research Council. In 1920, he headed the Carnegie Corporation of New York.

=== Yale presidency ===
In 1921, Angell was appointed President of Yale University, the first non-Yale graduate to hold the position since the early 18th century. That same year, he was elected as an honorary member of the Connecticut Society of the Cincinnati. At Yale, he oversaw a major expansion of Yale's physical campus, including the completion of the residential college system and Sterling Memorial Library. He remained president of the university until his retirement in 1937, at which point he became educational counselor of the National Broadcasting Company (NBC). He was elected a member of the American Philosophical Society in 1924 and a Fellow of the American Academy of Arts and Sciences in 1932. As president of Yale, Angell was a proponent of eugenics.

=== NBC ===
Angell's role at NBC was to "devise and suggest methods by which we may more capably serve radio's listening millions". He often wrote about that topic and lectured about it. Angell was a driving force behind the development of the art-appreciation program Art for Your Sake, which debuted on NBC radio in October 1939. He was also chairman of the Board of Trustees of the National Art Society, which devoted efforts to "'mass production plus mass distribution' of cultural products".

=== Death ===
Angell died on March 4, 1949, in New Haven, Connecticut.

=== Marriages ===
In 1894, James married Marion Isabel Watrous from Des Moines, Iowa, a fellow graduate of the University of Michigan. He had two children with her, one boy and one girl, but then she died in 1931. He subsequently married Katharine Cramer Woodman in 1932, who brought great joy to his life because of the interest she took in his students and problems. Katharine Angell founded the New Haven Restaurant Institute, later known as the Culinary Institute of America.

== Functional psychology ==
He was greatly influenced by the thought of John Dewey and is closely identified with functional psychology.

Angell laid out his three major points about functionalism during his presidential address for the American Psychological Association.

1. Functional psychology is interested in mental operations by way of mental activity and its relation to the larger biological forces. Angell believes that functional psychologists must consider the evolution of the mental operations in humans as one particular way to deal with the conditions of our environment. Mental operations by themselves are of little interest. Functional psychology is not conscious elements .
2. Mental processes aid in the cooperation between the needs of the organism and its environment. Mental functions help the organism survive by aiding in the behavioral habits of the organism and unfamiliar situations.
3. Mind and body cannot be separated because functionalism is the study of mental operations and their relationship with behavior. The total relationship of the organism and the environment and the minds function/place in this union is at question.

By stating these points, Angell drew the difference between functionalism as a study to discover how mental processed operate, what they accomplish that has kept them around, and the conditions in which they occur or the how and why of consciousness and its predecessor, structuralism, which focused on individual mental elements or the what of consciousness.

== Criticisms ==
James Angell did have some criticism come his way for his views. The backlash from some about his implication of leaving out the structuralism model in studies and having a completely functionalist view did not sit well amongst some of his peers. There was also the dissecting of his works and the assumption that he contradicted himself in his view of what consciousness was and its function. Some think that he portrayed consciousness as more of a deux ex machina entity in its function due to his claim that the function of the conscious was to appear when the organism was in trouble and then disappear soon after the trouble had passed. In her book Primate Visions: Gender, Race, and Nature in the World of Modern Science, Donna Haraway writes that "Angell paradigmatically represented the elaborate interconnections of university, industry, philanthropy, and science policy in the development of the material structures and ideologies of scientific management of society." (p. 67)

== Published books and articles ==
- Psychology: An Introductory Study of the Structure and Function of Human Consciousness'
- Chapters from Modern Psychology
- "The Influence of Darwin on Psychology" (part of a larger collection, Darwinism: Critical Reviews from Dublin Review, Edinburgh Review, Quarterly Review)
- "The Evolution of Intelligence" (part of a larger collection, The Evolution of Man: A Series of Lectures Delivered before the Yale Chapter of the Sigma Xi during the Academic Year 1921-1922)

== Notes ==
Educational offices
Preceded by Mary Whiton Calkins	15th President of the American Psychological Association; 1906–1907	Succeeded by Henry Rutgers Marshall
Academic offices
Preceded by Arthur Twining Hadley	President of Yale University; 1921–1937	Succeeded by Charles Seymour
