= Kerplunk =

Kerplunk may refer to:

- Kerplunk (album), an album by Green Day
- KerPlunk, a game of skill involving marbles and rods in a cylinder
- KerPlunk, a nickname given to the sculpture B of the Bang
- Kerplunk experiment, an experiment of psychology conducted by John Watson
- A tune by jazz trumpeter Donald Byrd on the 1956 Jackie McClean album Lights Out!

== See also ==
- Onomatopoeia, a word or phrase that both names and imitates a sound
