= Eleanor Gamble =

Psychologist

Eleanor Acheson McCulloch Gamble
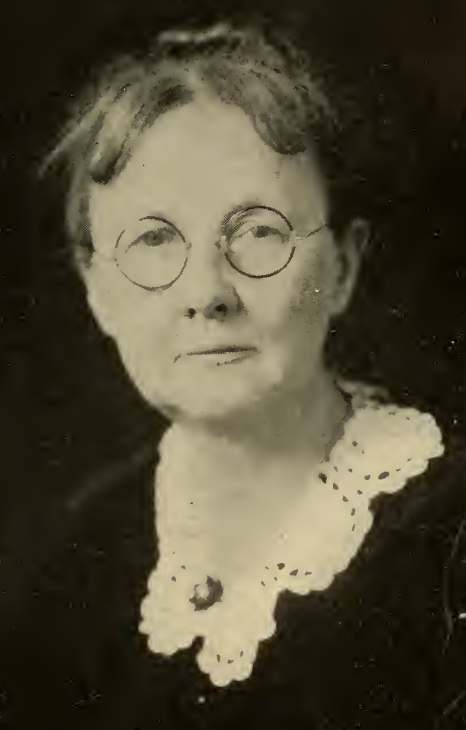
- Eleanor Gamble, from the 1926 yearbook of Wellesley College
- Born: 2 March 1868; Cincinnati, Ohio
- Died: 30 August 1933 (aged 65)
- Education: Wellesley College, Cornell University
- Scientific career
- Fields: Memory, Olfactory Senses
- Thesis: Applicability of Weber's Law to Smell (1898)
- Doctoral advisor: Edward B. Titchener

Eleanor Acheson McCulloch Gamble (March 2, 1868 – August 30, 1933) was an influential American psychologist from the late 19th century through the early 20th century. Gamble published most of her work on audition and memory influenced by Georg Elias Müller, Edward B. Titchener, Mary Whiton Calkins, and Ernst Heinrich Weber. Despite her chronic eye conditions she was successful in editing volumes of textbooks, her own papers, and directing many master's degree students. She earned her undergraduate degree from Wellesley College in 1889. She went on to obtain her doctorate from Cornell University in 1898. She held several teaching positions over the course of her career and was a member of several influential organizations including the American Psychological Association (APA). Gamble was a distinguished and well-liked professor at Wellesley College for more than two decades, and by 1930 she was the head of the Department of Philosophy and Psychology following the death of Mary Whiton Calkins. At the time of her death she was professor of psychology and director of the psychological laboratory at Wellesley College.

== Personal life ==
=== Education ===
Gamble's education began in 1889 when she graduated with her bachelor's degree Wellesley College, MA. She then went on to pursue her PhD at Cornell University, one of the few schools accepting women in this time period. During this time, she began to study smell under her supervisor E. B. Titchener and wrote her doctoral thesis “The Applicability of Weber’s Law to Smell”. Gamble was able to become a part of The Experimentalists since she received her PhD degree at Cornell University, because this university was one of the few universities accepting women during this time.

=== Medical problems ===
Gamble was considered physical handicapped from birth when they discovered she had amblyopia in her left eye. Later in her life, she began to develop glaucoma in her right eye after her first study abroad trip to Europe. Her vision continually worsened throughout her life despite several surgical operations.

== Career ==
Gamble's thesis

Eleanor Gamble received her PhD under Edward B. Titchener at Cornell in 1898. Next, she began teaching in her home state of Ohio, then New York, before being offered a teaching position in the philosophy and psychology department at her alma mater, Wellesley, all in 1898. At Wellesley she taught and specialized in experimental psychology. Gamble became an associate professor of psychology in 1903, and full professor seven years later in 1910. In her time as an associate professor, Gamble received a postdoctoral research grant to study with Müller in Germany in 1906. After returning from Germany, Gamble became the director of the psychological laboratory at Wellesley, previously run by Mary Whiton Calkins. From this position, Gamble supervised psychological research until the 1931. After Calkins died in 1930, Gamble became the new head of the philosophy and psychology department at Wellesley.

=== Professional organizations ===
- American Psychological Association
- American Philosophical Association
- Ninth International Congress of Psychology
- Sigma Xi
- Phi Beta Kappa

=== Publications ===
- The applicability of Weber's law to smell (1898)
- The perception of sound direction as a conscious process (1902)
- Attention and thoracic breathing (1905)
- Minor studies from the psychological laboratory of Wellesley College: Intensity as a criterion in estimating the distance of sounds (1909)
- A defense of psychology as science of selves (1915)
- A study in spatial associations in learning and in recall (1916)

== Legacy and memorials ==
Gamble's research on the olfactory senses and on memory gave way to new research, including research done by her own advisor, Titchener. At the time of her death, she was doing new research on word memory and chance-reactions to words. She helped to edit and publish multiple books, texts, articles, and theses. She was a beloved teacher and was even elected as an honorary member of the class of 1926 at Wellesley College.

Wellesley College has a series of stained glass windows in their chapel, including one dedicated to Eleanor Gamble on 17 June 1939. It was gifted to the college by her classmates of 1889. The window features multiple images, including a woman with a pen and book, and an owl to symbolize wisdom. The second is an image of St. Francis of Assisi, the patron saint of animals. Gamble loved animals and had multiple cocker spaniels whom she cared for greatly. The window has an inscription, 'Wisdom, expressive of the great teacher'. Her funeral was held at Wellesley College, and one of her colleagues, T. Proctor, gave a eulogy. According to Proctor, Eleanor was a very talented teacher who was very devoted to her research and students.
