= Karl M. Dallenbach =

American psychologist (1887–1971)

Karl M. Dallenbach (October 20, 1887 in Champaign, Illinois – December 23, 1971 in Austin, Texas) was an American experimental psychologist whose interests in psychology were heavily influenced by John Wallace Baird. He was a loyal student of Edward Bradford Titchener at Cornell University, received his Ph.D. degree in 1913, and was a member of the faculties of departments of psychology at Oregon State University, Ohio State University, Cornell, and The University of Texas at Austin.

Dallenbach did not develop any major theories and he never wrote a book. However, his 94 core publications (from a total of 234) can be organized around seven themes: attention, cutaneous sensitivity, somesthetic perception, taste, visual perception, 'facial' vision, and memory and cognitive processes. Some consider Dallenbach's studies of attention to be his most important of these contributions, while others maintain that his studies on facial vision and retention during sleep belong to the classical psy- chological literature.

A contribution that is perhaps Dallenbach's greatest contribution to psychology was his purchase, from G. Stanley Hall in 1920, and consequent rescue of the first American psychological journal: the American Journal of Psychology. Dallenbach owned the journal for the next forty-eight years and was its editor for forty-two. Dallenbach referred to the journal's volumes as his "books."
