= Functional psychology =

Psychological school of thought

Functional psychology or functionalism refers to a psychological school of thought that was a direct outgrowth of Darwinian thinking, which focuses attention on the utility and purpose of behavior that has been modified over years of human existence. Edward L. Thorndike, best known for his experiments with trial-and-error learning, came to be known as the leader of the loosely defined movement. This movement arose in the U.S. in the late 19th century in direct contrast to Edward Titchener's structuralism, which focused on the contents of consciousness rather than the motives and ideals of human behavior. Functionalism denies the principle of introspection, which tends to investigate the inner workings of human thinking rather than understanding the biological processes of the human consciousness.

While functionalism eventually became its own formal school, it built on structuralism's concern for the anatomy of the mind and led to greater concern over the functions of the mind and later to the psychological approach of behaviorism.

== History ==
Functionalism opposed the prevailing structuralism of psychology of the late 19th century. Edward Titchener, the main structuralist, gave psychology its first definition as a science of the study of mental experience, of consciousness, to be studied by trained introspection.

At the start of the nineteenth century, there was a discrepancy between psychologists who were interested in the analysis of the structures of the mind and those who turned their attention to studying the function of mental processes. This resulted in a battle of structuralism versus functionalism.

The main goal of Structuralism was to make attempts to study human consciousness within the confines of an actual living experience, but this could make studying the human mind impossible, functionalism is in stark contrast to that. Structural psychology was concerned with mental contents while functionalism is concerned with mental operations. It is argued that structural psychology emanated from philosophy and remained closely allied to it, while functionalism has a close ally in biology.

William James is considered to be the founder of functional psychology. But he would not consider himself as a functionalist, nor did he truly like the way science divided itself into schools. John Dewey, George Herbert Mead, Harvey A. Carr, and especially James Rowland Angell were the main proponents of functionalism at the University of Chicago. Another group at Columbia, including notably James McKeen Cattell, Edward L. Thorndike, and Robert S. Woodworth, were also considered functionalists and shared some of the opinions of Chicago's professors. Egon Brunswik represents a more recent, but Continental, version. The functionalists retained an emphasis on conscious experience.

Behaviourists also rejected the method of introspection but criticized functionalism because it was not based on controlled experiments and its theories provided little predictive ability. B.F. Skinner was a developer of behaviourism. He did not think that considering how the mind affects behaviour was worthwhile, for he considered behaviour simply as a learned response to an external stimulus. Yet, such behaviourist concepts tend to deny the human capacity for random, unpredictable, sentient decision-making, further blocking the functionalist concept that human behaviour is an active process driven by the individual. Perhaps, a combination of both the functionalist and behaviourist perspectives provides scientists with the most empirical value, but, even so, it remains philosophically (and physiologically) difficult to integrate the two concepts without raising further questions about human behaviour. For instance, consider the interrelationship between three elements: the human environment, the human autonomic nervous system (our fight or flight muscle responses), and the human somatic nervous system (our voluntary muscle control). The behaviourist perspective explains a mixture of both types of muscle behaviour, whereas the functionalist perspective resides mostly in the somatic nervous system. It can be argued that all behavioural origins begin within the nervous system, prompting all scientists of human behaviour to possess basic physiological understandings, something very well understood by the functionalist founder William James.

The main problems with structuralism were the elements and their attributes, their modes of composition, structural characteristics, and the role of attention. Because of these problems, many psychologists began to shift their attention from mental states to mental processes. This change of thought was preceded by a change in the whole conception of what psychology is.

Three parts ushered functional psychology into the modern-day psychology. Utilizing the Darwinian ideology, the mind was considered to perform a diverse biological function on its own and can evolve and adapt to varying circumstances. Secondly, the physiological functioning of the organism results in the development of the consciousness. Lastly, the promise of the impact of functional psychology to the improvement of education, mental hygiene and abnormal states.

== Notable people ==
=== James Angell ===
James Angell was a proponent of the struggle for the emergence of functional psychology. He argued that mental elements identified by the structuralist were temporary and only existed at the moment of sensory perception.

During his American Psychological Association presidential address, Angell laid out three major ideas regarding functionalism. The first of his ideas being that functional psychology is focused on mental operations and their relationship with biology and these mental operations were a way of dealing with the conditions of the environment. Second, mental operations contribute to the relationship between an organism's needs and the environment in which it lives. Its mental functions aid in the survival of the organism in unfamiliar situations. Lastly, functionalism does not abide by the rules of dualism because it is the study of how mental functions relate to behavior.

=== Mary Calkins ===
Mary Calkins attempted to make strides in reconciling structural and functional psychology during her APA presidential address. It was a goal of Calkin's for her school of self-psychology to be a place where functionalism and structuralism could unite under common ground.

=== John Dewey ===
John Dewey, an American psychologist and philosopher, became the organizing principle behind the Chicago school of functional psychology in 1894. His first important contribution to the development of functional psychology was a paper criticizing "the reflex arc" concept in psychology.

=== Herman Ebbinghaus ===
Herman Ebbinghaus's study on memory was a monumental moment in psychology. He was influenced by the Fechner's work on perception and from the Elements of Psychophysics. He used himself as a subject when he set out to prove that some higher mental processes could be experimentally investigated. His experiment was hailed as an important contribution to psychology by Wundt.

=== William James ===
James was the first American psychologist and wrote the first general textbook regarding psychology. In this approach he reasoned that the mental act of consciousness must be an important biological function. He also noted that it was a psychologist's job to understand these functions so they can discover how the mental processes operate. This idea was an alternative approach to Structuralism, which was the first paradigm in psychology (Gordon, 1995).

In opposition of Titchener's idea that the mind was simple, William James argued that the mind should be a dynamic concept.

James's main contribution to functionalism was his theory of the subconscious. He said there were three ways of looking at the subconscious in which it may be related to the conscious. First, the subconscious is identical in nature with states of consciousness. Second, it's the same as conscious but impersonal. Lastly, he said that the subconscious is a simple brain state but with no mental counterpart.

According to An Illustrated History of American Psychology, James was the most influential pioneer. In 1890, he argued that psychology should be a division of biology and adaptation should be an area of focus. His main theories that contributed to the development of functional psychology were his ideas about the role of consciousness, the effects of emotions, and the usefulness of instincts and habits

=== Joseph Jastrow ===
In 1901, Joseph Jastrow declared that functional psychology appeared to welcome the other areas of psychology that were neglected by structuralism. In 1905, a wave of acceptance was eminent as there had been a widespread acceptance of functionalism over the structural view of psychology.

=== Edward Titchener ===
Edward Titchener made arguments that structural psychology preceded functional psychology because mental structures need to be isolated and understood before their function be ascertained. Despite Titchener's enthusiasm towards functional psychology, he was weary and urged other psychologists to avoid the appeal of functional psychology and continue to embrace the rigorous introspective experimental psychology.

=== James Ward ===
James Ward was a pioneer of functional psychology in Britain. Once a minister, after experiencing a turmoil in his spiritual life, he turned to psychology but not without an attempt at physiology. He eventually settled for philosophy. He later made attempts at establishing psychological laboratory. Ward believed perception is not passive reception of sensation, but an active grasping of the environment. Ward's presence influenced the adoption of functionalist view in British psychology and later served as the turning point for the development of cognitive psychology.

=== Wilhelm Wundt ===
Later in his life, Dewey neglected to mention Wilhelm Wundt, a German philosopher and psychologist, as an influence towards his functional psychology. In fact, Dewey gave all credit to James. At the time it didn't seem worthwhile to bring up old theories from a German philosopher who only held a temporary spotlight and whose reputation went into a rather negative decline in America in the early twentieth century.

Wundt's major contribution to functional psychology was when he made will into a structural concept.

Though controversial, according to Titchener's definition of structuralism, Wundt was actually more of a structuralist than functionalist. Despite this claim, it is possibly one of the greatest ironies in the history of psychology that Wundt be deemed responsible for major contributions to functionalism due to his spark of several functionalist rebellions.

== Contemporary descendants ==
Evolutionary psychology is based on the idea that knowledge concerning the function of the psychological phenomena affecting human evolution is necessary for a complete understanding of the human psyche. Even the project of studying the evolutionary functions of consciousness is now an active topic of study. Like evolutionary psychology, James's functionalism was inspired by Charles Darwin's theory of natural selection.

Functionalism was the basis of development for several subtypes of psychology including child and developmental psychology, clinical psychology, psychometrics, and industrial/vocational psychology.

Functionalism eventually dropped out of popular favor and was replaced by the next dominant paradigm, behaviourism.

== See also ==
- Functionalism (philosophy of mind)
