= Walter Bowers Pillsbury =

American psychologist (1872–1960)

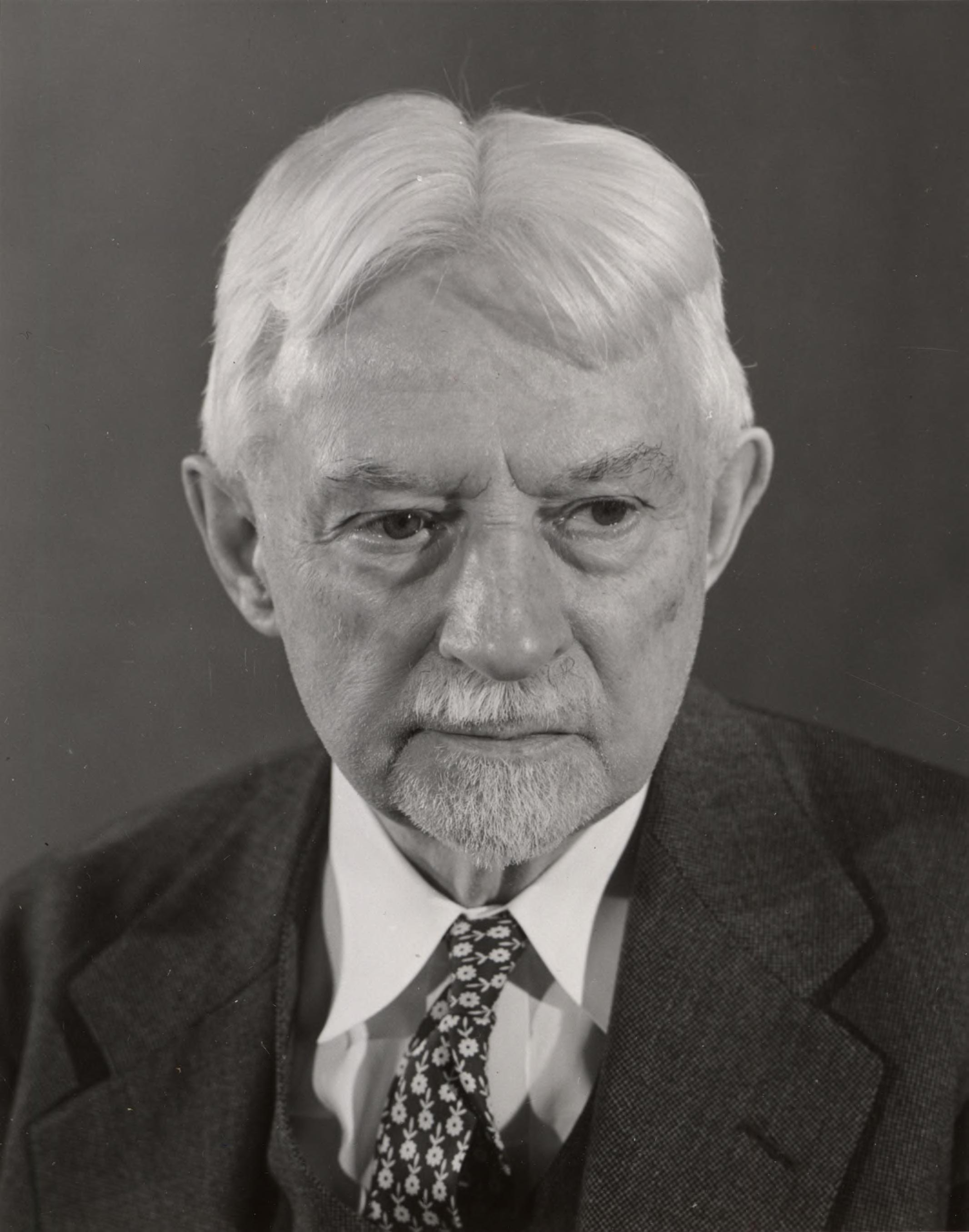
- Pillsbury (undated)
- Born: Walter Bowers Pillsbury; July 21, 1872; Burlington, Iowa, U.S.
- Died: June 3, 1960 (aged 87); Ann Arbor, Michigan, U.S.
- Education: Cornell University; University of Nebraska
- Scientific career
- Fields: Psychology
- Workplaces: Columbia University; University of Michigan
- Doctoral advisor: Edward B. Titchener
- Doctoral students: Irwin Berg

Walter Bowers Pillsbury (July 21, 1872 – June 3, 1960) was an American psychologist, born in Burlington, Iowa. He studied for two years at Penn College in Oskaloosa, Iowa, and graduated from the University of Nebraska (1892), and subsequently completed a Ph.D. at Cornell University (1896). Pillsbury taught at the University of Michigan after 1897, in 1905–1910 as junior professor of philosophy and director of the psychological laboratory and afterward as professor of psychology. In 1908–1909 he lectured at Columbia University.

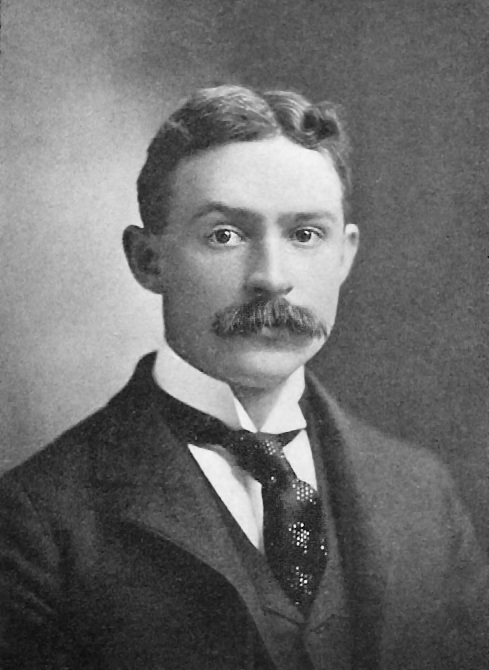
Pillsbury in 1906

He served as president of the Western Philosophical Association in 1907 and of the American Psychological Association in 1910. Besides contributing to the American Journal of Psychology and to The Philosophical Review, he translated, with Edward B. Titchener, Külpe's Introduction to Philosophy (1897) and published:

- L'Attention (1906; English edition, as Attention, 1908; Spanish translation, 1910)
- The Psychology of Reasoning (1910)
- The Essentials of Psychology (1911)
- A History of Psychology (1929)
