= Philosophische Studien =

19th-century psychology periodical

Philosophische Studien (Philosophical Studies) was the first journal of experimental psychology, founded by Wilhelm Wundt in 1881. The first volume was published in 1900; the last, the 18th, in 1903. Wundt then founded a similar volume entitled Psychologische Studien, with volumes from 1905 to 1917.

== Other early psychology journals ==
In 1887, G. Stanley Hall, who studied with Wundt in 1879, founded The American Journal of Psychology.

In 1890, Hermann Ebbinghaus and Arthur König founded Zeitschrift für Psychologie , then known as Zeitschrift für Psychologie und Physiologie der Sinnesorgane.

In 1903, one of Wundt's habilitants, Ernst Meumann, founded Archiv für die gesamte Psychologie.
