= Cheves Perky =

American psychologist

Mary Cheves West Perky
- Born: 1874
- Died: 1940 (aged 65–66)
- Other name: Cheves Perky
- Education: Cornell University
- Occupation: Psychologist
- Known for: Perky Effect

Mary Cheves West Perky (1874–1940) was an American psychologist and one of the twenty-one female students who studied under Edward B. Titchener at Cornell University. She received a Ph.D. in 1910 for her work on visual, auditory, and olfactory imagery, which was based on the theory from Edward Wheeler Scripture (Scripture, 1896). He stated that imagery and perception were related. Perky clarified this by saying perception can actually influence what a person thinks the image is.

Her findings continued to inform imagery research into the 21st century; a 2012 article in The American Journal of Psychology reviewed her contribution. According to her findings, perception is not merely a representation of the external world, but is also influenced by thoughts, expectations, and mental images. In the same year, she performed the "Banana Experiment," which demonstrated how perception and visual imagery could be confused; a phenomenon known as the Perky Effect. She concluded that mental imagery is not merely a weak form of perception, but it can directly influence sensory perception.

Perky also studied the cooperative movement, a group of organized activities aimed at providing benefits and mutual assistance among its members. Her engagement led her to become the Associate Secretary of the Cooperative League of America.

== Perky effect ==
The experiments performed by Perky in Titchener's lab in 1910 have been influential in the history of psychology and mental imagery research and are still being used today. Perky became important later in helping to explain how mental imagery and perception are related to psychological and neural processes.

Her experiments indicated that when sensory input and mental imagery interact, mental imagery can be mistaken for sensory input. Meaning, what you imagine can dominate perception of real-world images. Now known as the Perky Effect, her research described the result when a subject's visual perception is altered by imagining a sequence of images.

To test her hypothesis,

Perky instructed her participants to look at a blank screen in a dimmed room and try to imagine an object, (tomato, banana, leaf, orange), that matched the color that was projected. She asked her participants to fixate a point on a screen in front of them and to visualize their imagined object at that location. During this process, a faint image, like a yellow crescent, was projected in soft focus just above the threshold of visibility. Typically, participants reported imagining an object that did not match the projected shapes. Perky had led them to ignore the physical stimulus and maintain focus on what was imagined. This confusion is known as the Perky Effect.

The images were projected at a very low brightness to start and gradually increased in brightness. The participants were asked to describe the objects that corresponded to the image that was being projected.

...none of Perky's subjects (who ranged from a ten-year-old child to experienced introspectors of Titchener's laboratory) ever realized that they were experiencing real percepts; they took what they “saw” on the screen to be entirely the products of their imagination. However, the projections did influence their experiences.

Participants reported that they believed they were imagining the projected images rather than actually perceiving them. Additionally, they also reported “seeing” the mental images in greater detail than what was presented in the stimulus. Through her research, it has been shown that imagery can be derived from short and long-term memories. Perky also distinguished between "images of memory" and "images of imagination." Images of memory are personal episodic images and are associated with more eye movements and feelings of familiarity. Images of imagination are more general, have little meaning to an individual, and may be associated with feelings of surprise.

The Perky Effect, which describes the link between mental imagery and visual perception, has been a foundation for continued research in visual perception and imagery. Her studies have prompted replications and further investigation of how perception and imagery can affect visual acuity.

== Selected works ==
- Perky, Cheves West. "An experimental study of imagination." The American Journal of Psychology 21.3 (1910): 422-452.
- Perky, Cheves West. Cooperation in the United States. Intercollegiate Socialist Society, 1919.
- Perky, Cheves West. "Children in the Museum." Bulletin of the Pennsylvania Museum 27.143 (1931): 11-14.

== Sources ==
- Cooper, Cooper Sarah. Film and the Imagined Image. Edinburgh University Press, 2019.
- Proctor, Robert W., and Rand Evans. "EB Titchener, women psychologists, and the experimentalists." The American journal of psychology 127.4 (2014): 501-526.
- Calabi, Clotilde. "The Far Side of Things: Seeing, Visualizing and Knowing." Mind, Language and Action. De Gruyter, 2015. 335-346.
- Berger, Christopher C. Where imagination meets sensation: mental imagery, perception and multisensory Integration. Inst för neurovetenskap/Dept of Neuroscience, 2016.
- Dijkstra, Nadine, Peter Kok, and Stephen Fleming. "Perceptual reality monitoring: Neural mechanisms dissociating imagination from reality." (2021).
- Waller, David, et al. “A Century of Imagery Research: Reflections on Cheves Perky's Contribution to Our Understanding of Mental Imagery.” The American Journal of Psychology, vol. 125, no. 3, 2012, pp. 291–305. JSTOR,
