= Archiv für die gesamte Psychologie =

German language scientific journal on psychology

Archiv für die gesamte Psychologie (often abbreviated Arch. f. d. Psych.) is a German language scientific journal on psychology, founded in 1903 by E. Meumann. It was the "logical successor" to Wilhelm Wundt's Philosophische Studien.

It was edited until 1945 by Wilhelm Wirth and published by the Deutsche Gesellschaft für Psychologie. It was re-established in 1970 as the Archiv für Psychologie, which was published until 1990.
