= Harvey A. Carr =

American psychologist & academic (1873-1954)

- Harvey A. Carr
- Born: April 30, 1873; Morris, Illinois, United States
- Died: June 21, 1954 (aged 81); Culver, Indiana, United States
- Education: University of Chicago
- Known for: Kerplunk experiment
- Scientific career
- Fields: Psychology
- Workplaces: University of Chicago; Pratt Institute
- Doctoral advisor: James Rowland Angell

Harvey A. Carr (April 30, 1873 – June 21, 1954), a founding father of functionalist psychology, was renowned for a methodical and thorough approach to his science. His work was largely devoted to studies of animal cognition and perception. Carr collaborated with John B. Watson on his most well-known project: the famous Kerplunk experiment. Carr held his post as chairman of the Psychology department at the University of Chicago from 1926 to 1938. He also served as the president of the American Psychological Association in 1926.

== Background ==
=== Early life ===
Harvey A. Carr was born in Morris, Illinois, on April 30, 1873, to Hamilton Carr and Bell Garden.

He decided that psychology was not the route for him and chose to become a science teacher at the University of Harvard instead. Notably, he was not given the middle initial "A" at birth but instead chose it for himself later in life to round out his signature. Carr was a tall, slim man with a quick wit and a reserved, humble presence. His parents were free-thinkers who encouraged their son to make his own decisions about religion, education, and career. Carr states in his autobiography that the local community "firmly believed in the value of book learning—in so far as its acquisition did not interfere with the serious pursuits of life." With a thirst for knowledge even in these early years, Carr supplemented the teachings provided in his high school and taught himself physics, algebra, and chemistry from textbooks. Though college education was not typical or expected in the community, Carr was driven to learn more.

At the age of 18, Carr became a student of DePauw University's preparatory department. He was able to complete a three-year course in two years by taking extra classes and performing extra work in a district school. Carr entered college after completing prep school, and chose to remain at DePauw. Though he had not yet developed specific vocational goals, he felt that the opportunity to learn and sample several subjects was a valuable privilege. Carr opted to major in mathematics, which he found stimulating and absorbing. As his later research in psychology is marked by precision and objectivity, it is perhaps unsurprising that he was taken with mathematics in his early college days. Carr himself admits that this passion likely influenced his approach. He continued in this pursuit until he began to study differential equations; the difficulty of the subject made him doubt his mathematical prowess. Carr took up the study of history, which developed into a lifelong interest. He considered both physics and biology while seeking a new major, though both subjects were poorly supported by the university and the latter was considered to be taboo by the "authorities." The nature of biological study and basis in evolutionary theory were frowned upon in the distinctly religious university. Carr felt repressed by DePauw's religious stance against evolution, and became distrustful of those who would oppose scientific study. Still, he made respectable grades in all of his various subjects and had little concern about his future vocation. At this time, he considered a possible future in law, and decided that it would be best to work and save up prior to attending law school.

However, in his third year of college, a serious illness and financial pressures forced him to take leave and Carr returned home to recover for the rest of the year. The following year he spent working the farm and building back up his physical strength. Around this time, farmers in the area suffered some hardships, and Carr took up a job teaching in a country school close by in order to afford to return to school. He was familiar to the people of this area, and respected for his college education. The admiration motivated him to take his teaching duties seriously in order to fulfill the community's expectations of him. Carr had no prior education in educating, and quickly learned that the task required serious skill and experimentation in technique. He cited McMurray's Method of the Recitation as one of his main resources in learning this craft, which heavily impacted his later mentorship of his own graduate students. He found he enjoyed this work and taught with charisma and care in order to get the best from his students.

When Carr was ready to return to his own scholarship, he decided to opt for a change of scenery and chose to attend the University of Colorado in 1899. With his bachelor's degree completed, he decided to stay and pursued a Master's. The relocation was just what he needed, and the university provided him with fresh ideas and stimulation. At this time, he intended to try once again to major in mathematics. He felt discouraged by the instructor's unfavorable personality, however, and Carr felt compelled to study instead under another professor with whom he had made a connection. This professor taught Psychology and Education, and Carr identified similarities between these subjects and his own background and interests in teaching. Of psychology, Carr admittedly knew little. He decided to take a minor in history, and relished the opportunity to develop scientific skill in this field. In his words, "Perhaps science must be defined in terms of its spirit and method and not on the basis of the subject matter."

== Psychological study ==
=== Experimental experience ===
The University of Colorado provided a unique first experience in the field of psychology. His instructor, Arthur Allin, was fond of G. Stanley Hall's style of mentorship, and provided Carr with an enthusiastic and paternal hand in development. While such a style was criticized elsewhere, Carr respected both Allin's and Hall's influences. Though the university had no psychology lab, Allin encouraged Carr to become invested in experimental psychology. Allin himself cared little for apparatus and machinery, but saw the expanding interest in experimental work and predicted growth in that area of the discipline. Unfortunately, the lack of equipment meant that apparatus were improvised altogether and never produced success in their research.

The following year, 1902, Carr was given a fellowship as a grad student at the University of Chicago to study experimental psychology. Carr began to work closely with Dewey, Angell, and Watson, and he shared a great friendship with the latter two. When he first saw the lab, he was shocked by the tiny building, which was heavily worn and falling apart; Carr considered it to be "unfit for human habitation." Regardless, Carr took up collaboration with Watson in the lab and began his work in space perception. Perception, spatial reasoning, maze navigation, and animal cognition remained Carr's primary interests for years to come. In 1905, Carr defended his dissertation: "A visual illusion of motion during eye closure."

Following his doctoral defense, Carr spent a few years teaching at several schools, strengthening his skill. He taught psychology for two years at Pratt Institute, where he met his wife, Antoinette Cox. The two later had three children together.

=== Development of ideology ===
Carr returned to Chicago in 1907 and worked with Watson on the Kerplunk experiment. While the study gained fame, Carr was saddened when Watson's recognition called him away from Chicago and earned him a place at Johns Hopkins. Carr took charge of animal studies at Chicago in 1908, and continued the line of work they'd been developing. He published on a wide range of subjects, though his work was always characterized by a careful, skeptical and controlled approach. His publications also matured as he did, moving from specific topics in experimental psychology to more broad constructs. Carr focused increasingly on concepts like learning, consciousness, and the mind. He was known to question ideas which were being taken for granted by others. He cautiously examined curves of forgetting, limens, plateaus, range of attention, and memory. Carr's interest in Functionalism deepened, influenced by GF Stout, GH Mead, and the colleagues with whom he had worked closely. In Carr's version of Functionalism, which he called the "American psychology," adaptation and learning effects are emphasized. He found psychology to be defined by mental activity. While he was known to be open to new ideas, he was hesitant to accept Watson's Behaviorism, especially as it opposed his ideas of Mentalism. He found himself to be "somewhat of a behaviorist in the field of animal psychology" but did not accept the approach in human psychology. In his autobiography, Carr admitted that he wished he could see the future psychology of 1990, though he feared it would be woefully disappointing.

=== Influence ===
Functionalism and the University of Chicago's psychology program grew tremendously under Carr's influence. He went from his position as assistant professor all the way to chairman of the department, where he held his position from 1926 to 1938. During these years, he supervised graduate students with theses in various areas of psychology. He stated that 131 degrees were touched by his influence, 53 of those being doctoral dissertations under his direct supervision. He was involved in many psychological committees, and held positions as editor for the Journal of Experimental Psychology and the Journal of General Psychology. His writings, of which there are over 50, are influential and varied. He authored two books entitled Psychology, a Study of Mental Activity (1925) and An Introduction to Visual Space Perception (1935). He became president of the APA in 1927, giving an address entitled, Interpretation of the animal mind. He held a similar position in the Midwestern Psychological Association in 1937. In 1938, Carr became professor emeritus. In the years following his retirement, Carr devoted his energy primarily to students in the department rather than on publishing.
