= Irwin Berg =

American psychologist (1913–2001)

- Born: Irwin August Berg; October 9, 1913; Chicago, Illinois, U.S.
- Died: March 1, 2001 (aged 87); Baton Rouge, Louisiana, U.S.
- Education: University of Michigan
- Known for: Psychopathology
- Scientific career
- Fields: Psychology
- Workplaces: Pomona College; Louisiana State University; Northwestern University
- Doctoral advisor: Walter Bowers Pillsbury

Irwin August Berg (October 9, 1913 – March 1, 2001) was an American psychologist. He was dean and head of the Psychology Department of the College of Arts and Sciences at Louisiana State University. Previously President of the Illinois Psychological Association and the Southwestern Psychological Association in 1964, he contributed to the advancement of the study of psychopathology and counseling psychology.

Much of Berg's clinical work related to directly to the advancement of forensic assessment and the application of psychometrics to the theory of personality. He also made contribution to evaluations on the part of the Louisiana Legislature, and sought in increase the academic study of social deviance through association with correctional authorities. During the course of his own career he advocated for the merger of the fields of counseling psychology and clinical psychology, citing the lack of distinctive differentiation. His surviving clinical papers are archived by the University of Akron in Ohio and are accessible to the public.

== Select works and publications ==
- An Introduction to Clinical Psychology - Edited by L. A. Pennington and Irwin A. Berg. With a foreword by George D. Stoddard.
- Conformity and Deviation - Written by Irwin August Berg and Bernard M. Bass
- Objective Approaches to Personality Assessment - Written by Irwin August Berg and Bernard M. Bass
