= Art for Your Sake =

American radio art-appreciation series (1939–1940)

Art for Your Sake is an American art-appreciation radio series that was broadcast on NBC-Red from October 7, 1939, until April 27, 1940.

== Background ==
The National Art Society (NAS), which was formed shortly before Art for Your Sake debuted, helped to produce the program, which had as host Bernard Myers, a professor of art history at New York University. The program sought to extend appreciation of, and access to, art "to audiences far removed from the refinements and dilettantism of Paris and New York." One of the driving forces behind the program was James Rowland Angell, who became educational counselor at NBC in 1937, immediately after having been president of Yale University. He also was chairman of the Board of Trustees of NAS. He said that the program was "the first practical method I have heard of for bringing widespread public participation in the arts."

== Format ==
Episodes dramatized the stories behind masterpieces with Myers discussing each painting to complement the drama. Through the program, "a listener learned how Gauguin painted 'Tahitian Woman' and what influenced Rubens in his execution of 'Fox Hunt'." An episode about Thomas Hart Benton "intercut interview segments with relevant excerpts from secular and sacred folk music". Some content of episodes came from diaries and letters of the artists, and other content came from diaries and letters of people who knew them. Other artists who were featured on the program included Grant Wood, Emil Ganso, Rockwell Kent, Eugene Speicher, and Harry Watrous.

In some cities, including Cleveland, Denver, Milwaukee, and San Francisco, museums arranged for exhibitions, study groups, or both, related to the paintings featured on the program.

== Home and school studies ==
The NAS offered supplementary content that enabled a listener to study a painting visually while it was discussed on the air. Four portfolios were available for $1 each. Each portfolio contained full-color reproductions of 16 paintings, and three had illustrated brochures with critical and biographical content.

More formal use of episodes and supplementary material occurred in some schools. For example, radio station KSTP in St. Paul, Minnesota, made transcriptions of the series (along with full-color reproductions of the paintings, supplementary material for students, and a teacher's manual) available to all schools in Minnesota. In one case, a sophomore art class at Roosevelt High School in Minneapolis heard nine of the transcriptions, and the teacher assigned a creative project after each session. The Walker Art Center, also in Minneapolis, displayed the students' work for a month, and it "attracted considerable attention".

== Production ==
Art for Your Sake was broadcast on Saturdays at 7:30 p.m. Eastern Time. Some episodes were simulcast on television station W2XBS in New York City.

== Episodes ==
Partial List of Episodes of Art for Your Sake
Date	Artist
October 14, 1939	Rockwell Kent
October 21, 1939	Leonardo da Vinci
October 28, 1939	El Greco
December 30, 1939	Mary Cassatt
January 6, 1940	Thomas Hart Benton
January 13, 1940	Michelangelo

== Critical response ==
Leo G. Mazow wrote in his book Thomas Hart Benton and the American Sound that along with some of Benton's paintings and documents from NBC and NAS, "the script for the January 1940 dramatization of Benton's life on Art for Your Sake presents in a new, critical light questions posed by the artist's regionalist agenda, pointing as well to the movement's often overlooked mission of the mass distribution of cultural products."
