= Introspection =

Examining one's own thoughts and feelings

Introspection is the examination of one's own conscious thoughts and feelings. In psychology, the process of introspection relies on the observation of one's mental state, while in a spiritual context it may refer to the examination of one's soul. Introspection is closely related to human self-reflection and self-discovery and is contrasted with external observation.

It generally provides a privileged access to one's own mental states, not mediated by other sources of knowledge, so that individual experience of the mind is unique. Introspection can determine any number of mental states including: sensory, bodily, cognitive, emotional and so forth.

== In philosophy ==
Introspection has been a subject of philosophical discussion for thousands of years. The philosopher Plato asked, "...why should we not calmly and patiently review our own thoughts, and thoroughly examine and see what these appearances in us really are?" While introspection is applicable to many facets of philosophical thought it is perhaps best known for its role in epistemology; in this context introspection is often compared with perception, reason, memory, and testimony as a source of knowledge.

== In psychology ==
=== Wundt ===
It has often been claimed that Wilhelm Wundt, the father of experimental psychology, was the first to adopt introspection to experimental psychology though the methodological idea had been presented long before, as by 18th century German philosopher-psychologists such as Alexander Gottlieb Baumgarten or Johann Nicolaus Tetens. Later writers have warned that Wundt's views on introspection must be approached with great care. Wundt was influenced by notable physiologists, such as Gustav Fechner, who used a kind of controlled introspection as a means to study human sensory organs. Building upon that use of introspection in physiology, Wundt believed introspection included the ability to directly observe one's own experiences (not just to logically reflect on them or speculate about them, though some others misinterpreted his views in this way). Wundt imposed exacting control over the study of introspection in his experimental laboratory at the University of Leipzig, making it possible for other scientists to replicate his experiments elsewhere, a development that proved essential to the development of psychology as a modern, peer-reviewed scientific discipline. Such exact purism was typical of Wundt. He prepared a set of instructions to be followed by every observer in his laboratory during studies of introspection: "1) the Observer must, if possible, be in a position to determine beforehand the entrance of the process to be observed. 2) the introspectionist must, as far as possible, grasp the phenomenon in a state of strained attention and follow its course. 3) Every observation must, in order to make certain, be capable of being repeated several times under the same conditions and 4) the conditions under which the phenomenon appears must be found out by the variation of the attendant circumstances and when this was done the various coherent experiments must be varied according to a plan partly by eliminating certain stimuli and partly by grading their strength and quality".

=== Titchener ===
Edward Titchener was an early pioneer in experimental psychology and a student of Wilhelm Wundt. After earning his doctorate under Wundt at the University of Leipzig, he made his way to Cornell University, where he established his own laboratory and research. When Titchener arrived at Cornell in 1894, psychology was still a fledgling discipline, especially in the United States, and he was a key figure in bringing Wundt's ideas to America. However, Titchener misrepresented some of Wundt's ideas to the American psychological establishment, especially in his account of introspection which, Titchener taught, only served a purpose in the qualitative analysis of consciousness into its various parts, while Wundt saw it as a means to quantitatively measure the whole of conscious experience. Titchener was exclusively interested in the individual components that comprise conscious experience, while Wundt, seeing little purpose in the analysis of individual components, focused on synthesis of these components. Titchener's ideas formed the basis of the short-lived psychological theory of structuralism.

=== Historical misconceptions ===
American historiography of introspection, according to some authors, is dominated by three misconceptions. In particular, historians of psychology tend to argue 1) that introspection once was the dominant method of psychological inquiry, 2) that behaviorism, and in particular John B. Watson, was responsible for discrediting introspection as a valid method, and 3) that scientific psychology completely abandoned introspection as a result of those critiques. However, introspection may not have been the dominant method. It was widely believed to be dominant because Edward Titchener's student Edwin G. Boring, in his influential historical accounts of experimental psychology, privileged Titchener's views while giving little credit to original sources. Introspection has been critiqued by many other psychologists, including Wilhelm Wundt and Knight Dunlap, who presented a non-behaviorist argument against self-observation. Introspection is still widely used in psychology, but now implicitly, as self-report surveys, interviews and some fMRI studies are based on introspection. It is not the method but rather its name that has been dropped from the dominant psychological vocabulary.

=== Recent developments ===
Partly as a result of Titchener's misrepresentation, the use of introspection diminished after his death and the subsequent decline of structuralism. Later psychological movements, such as functionalism and behaviorism, rejected introspection for its lack of scientific reliability among other factors. Functionalism originally arose in direct opposition to structuralism, opposing its narrow focus on the elements of consciousness and emphasizing the purpose of consciousness and other psychological behavior. Behaviorism's objection to introspection focused much more on its unreliability and subjectivity which conflicted with behaviorism's focus on measurable behavior.

The more recently established cognitive psychology movement has to some extent accepted introspection's usefulness in the study of psychological phenomena, though generally only in experiments pertaining to internal thought conducted under experimental conditions. For example, in the "think aloud protocol", investigators cue participants to speak their thoughts aloud in order to study an active thought process without forcing an individual to comment on the process itself.

Already in the 18th century authors had criticized the use of introspection, both for knowing one's own mind and as a method for psychology. David Hume pointed out that introspecting a mental state tends to alter the very state itself; a German author, Christian Gottfried Schütz, noted that introspection is often described as mere "inner sensation", but actually requires also attention, that introspection does not get at unconscious mental states, and that it cannot be used naively — one needs to know what to look for. Immanuel Kant added that, if they are understood too narrowly, introspective experiments are impossible. Introspection delivers, at best, hints about what goes on in the mind; it does not suffice to justify knowledge claims about the mind. Similarly, the idea continued to be discussed between John Stuart Mill and Auguste Comte. Recent psychological research on cognition and attribution has asked people to report on their mental processes, for instance to say why they made a particular choice or how they arrived at a judgment. In some situations, these reports are clearly confabulated. For example, people justify choices they have not in fact made. Such results undermine the idea that those verbal reports are based on direct introspective access to mental content. Instead, judgements about one's own mind seem to be inferences from overt behavior, similar to judgements made about another person. However, it is hard to assess whether these results only apply to unusual experimental situations, or if they reveal something about everyday introspection. The theory of the adaptive unconscious suggests that a very large proportion of mental processes, even "high-level" processes like goal-setting and decision-making, are inaccessible to introspection. Indeed, it is questionable how confident researchers can be in their own introspections.

One of the central implications of dissociations between consciousness and meta-consciousness is that individuals, presumably including researchers, can misrepresent their experiences to themselves. Jack and Roepstorff assert, '...there is also a sense in which subjects simply cannot be wrong about their own experiential states.' Presumably they arrived at this conclusion by drawing on the seemingly self-evident quality of their own introspections, and assumed that it must equally apply to others. However, when we consider research on the topic, this conclusion seems less self-evident. If, for example, extensive introspection can cause people to make decisions that they later regret, then one very reasonable possibility is that the introspection caused them to 'lose touch with their feelings'. In short, empirical studies suggest that people can fail to appraise adequately (i.e. are wrong about) their own experiential states.

Another question in regards to the veracious accountability of introspection is if researchers lack the confidence in their own introspections and those of their participants, then how can it gain legitimacy? Three strategies are accountable: identifying behaviors that establish credibility, finding common ground that enables mutual understanding, and developing a trust that allows one to know when to give the benefit of the doubt. That is to say, that words are only meaningful if validated by one's actions; When people report strategies, feelings or beliefs, their behaviors must correspond with these statements if they are to be believed.

Even when their introspections are uninformative, people still give confident descriptions of their mental processes, being "unaware of their unawareness". This phenomenon has been termed the introspection illusion and has been used to explain some cognitive biases and belief in some paranormal phenomena. When making judgements about themselves, subjects treat their own introspections as reliable, whereas they judge other people based on their behavior. This can lead to illusions of superiority. For example, people generally see themselves as less conformist than others, and this seems to be because they do not introspect any urge to conform. Another reliable finding is that people generally see themselves as less biased than everyone else, because they are not likely to introspect any biased thought processes.

One experiment tried to give their subjects access to others' introspections. They made audio recordings of subjects who had been told to say whatever came into their heads as they answered a question about their own bias. Although subjects persuaded themselves they were unlikely to be biased, their introspective reports did not sway the assessments of observers. When subjects were explicitly told to avoid relying on introspection, their assessments of their own bias became more realistic.

== In religion ==
=== Buddhism ===
In Buddhism, Sampajañña refers to "the mental process by which one continuously monitors one's own body and mind. In the practice of śamatha, its principal function is to note the occurrence of laxity and excitation." It is of central importance for meditative practice in all Buddhist traditions.

=== Judaism ===
In Judaism, particularly in the teachings of the practitioners of Mussar a person could achieve progress in perfecting their character traits through a daily "Cheshbon Hanefesh", or Accounting of the Soul. In the practice of Cheshbon Hanefesh, a person introspects about themselves, their day, their faults, progress, and so on, and over time can use the data and process to change behavior and thoughts. Introspection is encouraged during the penitent season in the month of Elul in order to correct the year's sins through repentance, which in Judaism begins with recalling and recognizing them.

=== Christianity ===
In Christianity, perfection is not just the possession and preservation of sanctifying grace, since perfection is determined by one's action, although Christian mysticism has gained a renewed interest in western Christianity and is prominent in eastern Christianity.

In Eastern Christianity some concepts addressing human needs, such as sober introspection (nepsis), require watchfulness of the human heart and the conflicts of the human nous, heart or mind. Noetic understanding can not be achieved by rational or discursive thought (i.e. systemization).

Rationalists view prayer as a way to help train a person to focus on divinity through philosophy and intellectual contemplation (meditation).

=== Jainism ===
Jains practise pratikraman (Sanskrit "introspection"), a process of repentance of wrongdoings during their daily life, and remind themselves to refrain from doing so again. Devout Jains often do Pratikraman at least twice a day. Many practice Pratikraman on holy days such as Samvatsari, or Forgiveness Day.

=== Hinduism ===
Introspection is encouraged in schools such as Advaita Vedanta; in order for one to know their own true nature, they need to reflect and introspect on their true nature—which is what meditation is. Especially, Swami Chinmayananda emphasised the role of introspection in five stages, outlined in his book "Self Unfoldment".

=== Islam ===
In Islam, greater jihad is the exertion of effort to internally struggle against one's evil inclinations. In Sufism, nafs is in its unrefined state "the ego", which is considered to be the lowest dimension of a person's inward existence—his animal and satanic nature.

== In fiction ==
Interior monologue is the fiction-writing mode used to convey a character's silent thoughts, which may include introspective thoughts. As explained by Renni Browne and Dave King, "One of the great gifts of literature is that it allows for the expression of unexpressed thoughts..."

According to Nancy Kress, a character's thoughts can greatly enhance a story: deepening characterization, increasing tension, and widening the scope of a story. As outlined by Jack M. Bickham, thought plays a critical role in both scene and sequel.

== See also ==
- Conceptual proliferation
- Generation effect
- Human self-reflection
- Insight
- Intrapersonal communication
- Introversion
- Know thyself
- Metacognition
- Mode (literature)
- Psychological mindedness
- Phenomenology (philosophy)
- Phenomenology (psychology)
- Pratikramana
- Psychonautics
- Psychophysics
- Rumination (psychology)
- Self-awareness
- Self-consciousness
- Self-discovery
- Stream of consciousness
- Style (fiction)
