= Kerplunk experiment =

Experiment conducted on rats

The Kerplunk experiment was a stimulus and response experiment conducted on rats and demonstrates the ability to turn voluntary motor responses into a conditioned response. The purpose of the experiment was to get kinaesthetic feedback rather than guidance through external stimuli via maze learning. It was conducted in 1907 by John B. Watson and Harvey A. Carr and its name comes from the sound the rat made after running into the end of the maze. The study would help form a chain of responses, hypothesis proposed by Watson.

The study's findings would later give credibility to stimulus and response interpretations that rewards work by strengthening the learned ability to show a habitual motor action in the presence of a particular stimulus.

== The experiment ==
Rats were trained to run in a straight, alley-like maze for a food reward which was located at the end of the alley. Watson found that once the rat was well trained, it performed almost automatically on reflex. Upon learning the maze over time, they started to run faster through each length and turn. By the stimulus of the maze, their behavior became a series of associated movements, or kinaesthetic consequences instead of stimulus from the outside world. This routine continued until the length of the path changed, either lengthened or shortened.

If the conditioned rats were released into an alleyway or path that was shortened, they would run straight into the end of the wall making a "kerplunk" sound. The first trial found that they would run full speed, passing up the food which had been moved closer. Shortening the alleyway, and moving the food closer was an early signal that was ignored by the rats.

If the path was longer, the rats would run as usual until it reached their customary distance where the food would normally be. They would then pause to sniff the area even though they had not reached the end of the alley, often ignoring food that was further away.
