= Mary Whiton Calkins =

American philosopher and psychologist

- Born: March 30, 1863; Hartford, Connecticut
- Died: February 26, 1930 (aged 66); Newton, Massachusetts
- Resting place: Mount Auburn Cemetery
- Occupations: Professor of psychology and philosophy
- Board member of: President of the American Psychological Association, President of the American Philosophical Association

Academic background
- Education: Bachelor of Arts in classics and philosophy, unawarded PhD in psychology (see text)
- Alma mater: Smith College, then Harvard University unofficially (see text)
- Thesis: Association. An essay analytic and experimental. (1896)
- Doctoral advisor: Hugo Münsterberg
- Other advisors: Josiah Royce; William James; Edmund Sanford

Academic work
- Discipline: Philosopher, psychologist
- Institutions: Wellesley College

Mary Whiton Calkins (/ˈkɔːlkɪnz, ˈkæl-/; 30 March 1863 – 26 February 1930) was an American philosopher and psychologist, whose work informed theory and research of memory, dreams and the self. She developed the paired-associate learning technique and the theory of self-psychology. In 1903, Calkins was the twelfth in a listing of fifty psychologists with the most merit, chosen by her peers. In 1895 Calkins was refused a Ph.D. by Harvard University because of her gender even though she completed all the requirements. Calkins' experience at Harvard reflected the limited status of women in graduate education at the time, as they were often permitted to attend lectures informally but were excluded from official enrollment and degree recognition. She was given honorary membership of the British Psychology Association in 1928.

She taught psychology and philosophy at Wellesley College for four decades, and conducted research there and at Harvard University. At Wellesley College, Calkins established the first psychological laboratory for women. She later became president of the American Psychological Association and the American Philosophical Association, and was the first woman to be president of both.

== Background ==
Mary Whiton Calkins was born on March 30, 1863, in Hartford, Connecticut. She was the eldest of Wolcott and Charlotte Whiton Calkins's five children in what was a close family. In 1880, when she was 17 her family moved to Newton, Massachusetts so her father, a Presbyterian minister, could take up a new job.

In 1882, Calkins entered Smith College as a sophomore. She studied there for a year. Following the death of her sister in 1883, she took a year off from college and travelled to Greece where she received private tutoring. During this year, she also tutored two of her brothers. She returned to Smith College in 1884 and graduated that same year with a degree in classics and philosophy. Her academic background in classics and philosophy influenced her later work in psychology, particularly her interest in the concept of herself.

After graduation, Calkins and her family took an eighteen-month trip to Europe, and she was able to explore Leipzig, Italy, and Greece. During her travels she also tutored her two brothers and in Greece she spent several months travelling and studying modern Greek. When she returned to Massachusetts, her father set up an interview with the President of Wellesley College, an all women's college, for a tutoring job in the classics department. He was a strong supporter of her education, helping her access educational and professional opportunities at a time where women faced significant barriers. She worked at Wellesley as a tutor and eventually as a teacher for three years. A professor in the philosophy department noticed Calkins's excellent teaching and offered her a position to teach psychology, which was new to the philosophy department's curriculum. Calkins accepted the offer on the contingency that she would be able to study psychology for one year.

Finding a psychology course that accepted women proved difficult. She considered psychology programs at the University of Michigan with John Dewey, Yale University with George Trumbull Ladd, Clark University with Granville Stanley Hall, and Harvard University with William James. She expressed interest in studying in a laboratory setting, a specification of which only Clark University and Harvard University had at the time. She sought admission to Harvard most likely due to its proximity to her home in Newton. Harvard did not permit women to study at their institution, but it allowed her to sit in on lectures after her father and Wellesley's president had sent letters asking for her admittance. Calkins decided to take classes at Harvard Annex (predecessor of Radcliffe College), taught by Josiah Royce.

== Career ==
Calkins published four books and over one hundred papers in her career, in both the fields of psychology and philosophy. Calkins was interested in memory and later in the concept of the self. She is best known for her accomplishments within the field of psychology and her struggles to achieve. She was the first woman to serve as president of the American Psychological Association, marking a significant milestone for women in psychology. After being rejected for a degree from Harvard, Calkins continued to work and strive for equality. Her rejection reflected broader barriers faced by women in higher education, where they were often allowed to study but denied formal recognition for their work. Despite this, she continued her academic work in psychology and became a highly respected scholar in the field.

In 1903, Calkins ranked twelfth in a listing of fifty top-ranked psychologists, an achievement that happened after James McKeen Cattell asked ten psychologists to rank their American colleagues in order of merit.

=== Initial psychological training ===
Royce influenced Calkins to take classes taught by William James in Harvard, with men as her peers. However, Harvard president Charles William Eliot opposed this idea of a woman learning in the same room as a man. With pressure from James and Royce, along with a petition from Calkins' father, Eliot allowed her to study in the classes, with the stipulation that she was a guest, and not a registered student.

Calkins began her serious study of psychology under William James, shortly after his highly renowned textbook, The Principles of Psychology, was printed in 1890. Calkins highly regards one of her first experiences with James in her autobiography, stating:

what I gained from the written page, and even more from tete-a-tete discussion was, it seems to me as I look back upon it, beyond all else, a vivid sense of the concreteness of psychology and of the immediate reality of 'finite individual minds' with their 'thoughts and feelings'.

Although Calkins was very impressed by James' philosophies and he had initiated her into the field of psychology, James was not an experimentalist, and that was more of Calkins' area of interest. However, she claims that ultimately it was James' doctrines of the transitive feelings of relation, the feelings of and, if, and but, and the concept of consciousness as tending to the "personal form," which could have been what began her major interest in the self.

While studying with James, Calkins had first suggested attention as a topic for one of her papers, however, she said that James had frowned upon that since he was sick of the subject. Her topic of association was arbitrarily chosen, and became one of the major interests of her psychological career.

=== Experimental psychology ===
Following her training under James, Calkins worked alongside Edmund Sanford of Clark University, who later assisted her in setting up the first psychology laboratory run by women at Wellesley College. Sanford trained Calkins on experimental laboratory procedures, as well as helped in the creation and assembly of numerous laboratory instruments for Wellesley's psychological laboratory.

When Calkins was tutored by Sanford, she was allowed to conduct a research project that involved studying the contents of Sanford and her dreams recorded throughout a seven-week period. She recorded 205 dreams and Sanford 170. They woke themselves by using alarm clocks at different hours of the night and recorded their dreams at the instant of waking. They slept with a notepad right beside their bed to allow note-taking of dreams as quickly as possible. Each morning, they studied all the records regardless of whether they seemed slight and trivial, or significant. They also took account of the different types of dreams and they discovered elements of various emotions.

As part of the project, also considered was the relation of the dream to the conscious, waking life, distinguishing the individuals and places in their dream experiences. Calkins explains in her autobiography that the dream "merely reproduces in general the persons and places of recent sense perception and that is it rarely associated with that which is of paramount significance in one's waking experience". Calkins and Sanford address the loss of identity in dreams as "not a loss but a change or a doubling of self-consciousness ... yet all the time one is conscious that it is oneself who has changed or whose identity is doubled". Their dream study involved a systematic self-recording method in which Calkins and Sanford recorded hundreds of dreams immediately upon waking, making it one of the earliest structured investigations of dream content and its relationship to waking experiences. Their findings suggested that dreams were closely related to recent waking experiences and reflected elements of everyday life.

Calkins' research was cited by Sigmund Freud when he created his conception of the dream. She also claimed that Freudians at the time were "superficially concerned with the 'manifest content' of dreams". The results of a recent study done by Montangero and Cavallero (2015) suggest that the consecutive events of the dreams of their participants were rarely plausible, and often seemed to have no relation to one another. This suggests that dreams have little hidden meaning, and supports the findings of Calkin's original dream study. These findings are consistent with Calkins’ broader research on dreams, which formed part of her work on psychology and mental processes. Her work is considered one of the earliest systematic studies of dreams, contributing to the scientific investigation of dream content.

Psychological laboratory and courses at Wellesley

In 1891, Calkins returned to Wellesley as an instructor of psychology in the philosophy department. 12 years after the first psychology laboratory was established by Wilhelm Wundt in Leipzig, Germany, Calkins established the first psychology lab to be founded by a woman in 1891, and the first lab to be established at a women's college. Calkins had many of the apparatuses constructed at nearby venues. Her lab was in the attic spaces of the fifth floor of College Hall in Wellesley College. After the laboratory was established, it quickly gained popularity; her first course on "psychology approached from the physiological standpoint" yielded over fifty students. These students were instructed in some areas of psychology and conducted experiments on such subjects as sensation and association.

A fire broke out in a nearby physics lab in 1914, which destroyed Wellesley College hall, including Calkins's laboratory among with others. No students or instructors were injured in the fire, but the first psychology laboratory established by a woman was destroyed. The laboratory was rebuilt, and Eleanor Gamble later succeeded Calkins in running it.

=== Further education ===
When Calkins began to make plans for furthering her education in psychology, advice from Sanford discouraged her from schools like Johns Hopkins and Clark, suggesting they were not likely to admit women as students much like her experience at Harvard. Sanford did encourage Calkins to explore sex programs in Europe, making an inference that Hugo Münsterberg admitted female students to his laboratory in Freiburg, Germany (after seeing a picture of Münsterberg in his lab with a woman). After expressing her desire to work with Münsterberg to James, she learned from him that Münsterberg would soon be coming to work at Harvard.

In the three years that Calkins studied under Münsterberg, several of her papers were published, including research she conducted with Sanford on dreams and her first paper on association. In her autobiography, she describes Münsterberg as "a man of deep learning, high originality, and astounding versatility."

Other work with Münsterberg included their dream study. Hugo would begin by training her in the detail of laboratory experiments, giving her a research problem based on records that the two of them had taken of their dreams over several weeks. Over those weeks they would wake themselves with alarm clocks at different hours of the night, recorded their dreams, and then studied them intensely. The conclusion they reached was that dreams were nothing more than reproductions of "the persons, places, and events of recent sense perception."

The discrimination she experienced due to her sex was also illustrated in earlier episodes. In her autobiography, Calkins reminisces on a date in which, as a member of the executive committee of the American Psychological Association, Munsterberg and his students, including Calkins, were to attend a lunch meeting of the Committee at the Harvard Union. The waiter there, though, protested the group's entrance stating that "no woman might set foot in the main hall; nor was it possible to admit so many men, balanced solely by one woman, to the ladies' dining-room." Although it seems like Calkins had a constant struggle as a female in her field, she expressed in her autobiography her gratitude for the individuals that did not discriminate against her. The "friendly, comradely, and refreshingly matter-of-fact welcome" that she received from the men working in Munsterberg's laboratory as assistants and students are described in her book with great appreciation. She also expressed her indebtedness to Munsterberg who "swung the Laboratory doors" open to her without hesitation.

==== Doctoral research ====
During this time, Calkins also studied memory, leading to her invention of the right associate's method, now known as the paired-associations technique. Calkins explains in her autobiography that "by showing series of colors paired with numerals, I found that a numeral which has repeatedly appeared in conjunction with a given color was more likely than either a vividly colored numeral or than the numeral last paired with the color, to be remembered, on a reappearance of the given color".

A series of Calkins' experiments under Hugo Münsterberg, taking place between 1894 and 1896, was concerned with the concept of recency as it relates to a person's ability to remember something. Her paired-associates technique showed that recency yields to the vividness, and both vividness and recency yields to frequency. Her method consisted of showing a series of colors paired with numerals, followed by testing for recall of the numbers when the colors with which they were previously paired are flashed again. The findings of her study revealed that numbers paired with bright colors were retained better than those associated with neutral colors. This emphasis on frequency over vividness demonstrated that repeated exposure played a significant role in memory performance. Yet, the prime factor influencing memory was not color but the frequency of exposure.

Calkins described the technical memorizing method that she used, known as paired-associations, as even more significant than the results of the experiment. The formula where a subject is presented with a stimulus and asked to provide the appropriate response became a standard tool for studying human learning. Although Georg Elias Müller criticized her method, he refined and adopted it, calling it Treffermethode (lit. 'hit method') and it has been widely used ever since. Edward B. Titchener included her research in his Student's Manual, and in her autobiography, Calkins refers to a Professor Kline who selected the paired-associates method for his textbook, Psychology By Experiment. The paired-associates technique was also included in psychology textbooks published by Herrnstein and Boring. Although the paired-associates technique is regarded as one of Calkins' biggest contributions to psychology, Calkins herself did not attach very much importance to this work.

It is suggested that, despite Calkins often downplaying the memory implications of her research, her writings "constitute a truly remarkable legacy ... [they] represent important, basic, replicable phenomena that are fundamentally important."

Her study on paired associates learning under Münsterberg constituted her doctoral dissertation which was published in 1896. The paired-associates method continues to be used in psychological research today, demonstrating that lasting impact of Calkins’ work on the study of memory. Harvard refused to approve the unanimous recommendation of the Department of Philosophy and Psychology to grant Calkins her doctoral degree. Eliot believed strongly that the two sexes should be educated separately and, although he allowed Calkins to be a "guest," he and the rest of the board refused to grant her the degree. Calkins had completed all of the requirements for the Ph.D., including passing exams and completing a dissertation, and all of her Harvard professors had recommended her for the degree. Yet, solely due to her gender, she was denied the honour of a conferred degree. James was astonished and described her performance as "the most brilliant examination for the Ph.D. that we have had at Harvard." She was the first woman to complete the requirements for a PhD in psychology from Harvard, which she did in 1895.

Calkins' most notable instance of social justice for women was her rejection of a PhD from Radcliffe, a women's college in association with Harvard. Although the qualification has never been officially conferred, Calkins was one of the first women complete all the coursework, examinations, and research for a doctoral degree. (Margaret Floy Washburn was the first woman to complete Ph.D. in psychology in 1894.) In 1902, Radcliffe offered doctoral degrees to Calkins and three other women who had completed their studies at Harvard but were not granted PhDs due to their gender. The three other women accepted the degree, and Munsterberg urged Calkins that she should also accept, claiming a PhD from Radcliffe held the same weight as a PhD from Harvard. Calkins rejected Radcliffe's offer. Her rejection of the Radcliffe degree reflected her belief that it was not fully equivalent to a Harvard PhD, and demonstrated her commitment to equal academic recognition for women in higher education. In the rejection letter to the Radcliffe board it stated:

I sincerely admire the scholarship of the three women to whom it is to be given and I should be very glad to be classed with them. I furthermore think it highly probable that the Radcliffe degree will be regarded, generally, as the practical equivalent of the Harvard degree and finally I should be glad to hold the Ph D degree for I occasionally find the lack of it an inconvenience, and now that the Radcliffe degree is offered, I doubt whether the Harvard degree will ever be open to women.

On the other hand, I still believe that the best ideals of education would be better served if Radcliffe College refused to confer the doctor's degree. You will be quick to see that, holding this conviction, I cannot rightly take the easier course of accepting the degree.

— Mary Whiton Calkins, as quoted in Furumoto, 1980, p. 66, via Psychology's Feminist Voices, "Profile: Mary Whiton Calkins".

Despite ongoing petitioning, as of 2015 Harvard University continues to refuse to posthumously award her with a doctoral degree.

=== Later work ===
With her supplemental education completed, she returned to Wellesley in 1895 as an associate professor of psychology. At this time, it was particularly impressive for women in academia to successfully balance teaching, research, and leadership roles, making her career especially significant. Two years after her return she became a professor of psychology and philosophy. This addition allowed her to return to her lectures on the classics and Greek. Her experimental work continued throughout this time. Calkins paired-associates method became a foundational experimental technique in memory research and later influenced how psychologists studied learning and recall processes in humans.

Calkins' first textbook, An Introduction to Psychology, was published in 1901. The Persistent Problems of Philosophy (1907) and The Good Man and The Good (1918) were two publications in which she expressed her philosophical views.

In 1905 she was elected president of the American Psychological Association and the American Philosophical Association in 1918. She was the first woman to hold a position in both societies. She was awarded an honorary Doctor of Letters in 1909 from the Columbia University and a Doctorate of Laws in 1910 from Smith College. She was also the first woman elected to honorary membership on the British Psychological Society.

==== The self ====
One of her contributions to psychology was her system of self-psychology. Beginning in 1900, Calkins began to publish a series of papers in which she described psychology as a "science of the self" – this would be a premise to the development of her system of self-psychology. She spent many years trying to define the idea of the self, but she concluded that she could in no way define it. She stated that even though the self was indefinable, it was "a totality, one of many characters... a unique being in the sense that I am I and you are you ..."

In a time when there were several schools of thought, Calkins established the school of self-psychology. In her self-psychology approach, Calkins argued that psychology should study the self as a unified whole rather than breaking mental life into separate, isolated processes. This became quite unpopular and controversial as many psychologists did not feel the self or soul was relevant. At the time, the main schools of psychology were structuralism and functionalism, which were quite competitive with one another; statements made by one school could expect a strong rebuttal from the other. Self-psychology was influenced by William James' theory of the idea of multiple selves (including the material self, social self, and spiritual self), and a particular interest to Calkin's, Josiah Royce's theory that humans define themselves through interpersonal communication.

She spent a great deal of time working with the system of self-psychology, critically examining the self from both philosophical and psychological viewpoints. Over her many years of study, Calkins wrote many books and articles on the topic of self-psychology. Over the years she spent working on the system, it was widely unpopular, which is why she is less often remembered for her work relating to it. Despite its lack of appreciation, Calkin's refused to lose interest in the subject, which is described as "the science of conscious selves." By way of studying self-psychology, she was able to form descriptions of the self, such as the self that remains the same, the self that is changed, the unique self, and a few other descriptions. She would go on to discuss self-psychology during the entirety of her career, mentioning it in some of her books, one of which is A First Book in Psychology.

Her reasoning for self-psychology being so unpopular was a notion that "one is so constantly aware of one's self that one might understandably overlook it when reporting on a sensational experience," and adding that it led to a lack of reference to the self in introspective studies. She also suggested that the system was not well taken by fellow psychologists or scientists, one of which being confusion over the self's relationship with the soul, which she discusses in her article, "The Case of Self Against Soul" in 1917. In this article, she explains that our soul should be considered life itself. She would take to theoretical arguments to promote her system, noting its organizing role within psychology. Calkins defined the three basal concepts in self-psychology to be the subject, the object, and the relation between the subject and the object. Calkins distinguished self-psychology from the predominant schools of atomism, behaviorism, Gestalt-psychology, and psychophysical personalism, while still maintaining that self-psychology could incorporate the central tenets espoused by these schools.

Calkins considered her self-psychology to be a form of introspectionist psychology, involving examining one's own mental experience. She believed that causing someone to think introspectively could help in multiple aspects of their life including religion, their morals, and various other aspects in the mind that otherwise may not be thought of. Introspectionistic psychology was composed of two schools: impersonalistic, which denied the "self" in its definition of psychology, and personalistic, which defined psychology as the study of consciousness, functioning, experiencing selves. Calkins' conviction was that a laboratory was essential for adequate instruction in psychology. Calkins claimed that self-psychology could be experimentally investigated, but did not personally involve herself in laboratory experiments relating to self-psychology. Calkins desired that her school of self-psychology would be a theory on which functionals and structuralists could find common ground.

Calkins' self-psychology did not live without criticism from fellow psychologists of the era. James Angell, a founding father of functionalism, opposed Calkins' neglect of the body as part of the self. Following Calkins' Presidential Address (of the American Psychological Association), where Calkins publicly outlined self-psychology, he claims: "Such as functional psychology as I have been presenting would be entirely reconcilable with Miss Calkins' 'psychology of selves' ... were it not for her extreme scientific conservatism in refusing to allow the self to have a body ... The real psychological self, as I understand her, is pure disembodied spirit - an admirable thing of good religious and philosophic ancestry, but surely not the thing before which psychology is under any obligation to know". This was written despite its inaccuracy; Calkins did in fact leave considerable room for the body in her address, taking sensorimotor processes and physiological phenomena into account, however, she did not consider the body as an essential "basal fact" of psychology.

== Personal life ==
Outside of her contributions to the field of psychology, Calkins was an avid supporter of women's rights. Calkins was a suffragist, disputing "in a democratic country, governed as this is by the suffrage of its citizens, and given over as this is to the principle and practice of educating women, a distinction based on the difference of sex is artificial and illogical". Calkins was a pacifist and a member of the American Civil Liberties Union. While working at Wellesley around the time of World War I, a colleague of Calkins was fired for holding pacifistic views. Calkins offered her resignation, stating she held the same views as her colleague who was terminated, but her resignation from Wellesley was not accepted by the President or board.

As it can be seen in her writings, although she was very grateful for the individuals who accepted her, she did not hold resentment against those who did not. For instance, instead of expressing disdain towards the Harvard board for not accepting her application for a degree, she conveyed her appreciation toward Harvard for allowing her to partake in the courses, conduct research under her professors, and work with individuals such as James, Sanford and Münsterberg. She also mentions the assistance of figures such as Robert MacDougall and several others who spent years with her as her mechanicians, subjects, counselors, and even friends. In addition, when the episode with the waiter refusing her admission took place, she stated in her autobiography that "he correctly insisted against her admission." Overall, Calkins’ life highlights both her major contributions to psychology and the barriers women faced in gaining recognition in the field.

She is buried in the Mount Auburn Cemetery.

== Legacy and historical recognition ==
Mary Whiton Calkins is still considered an important figure in early psychology today, especially because of her work on memory, dreams, and self-psychology. Her paired-associates method is often mentioned as one of her bigger contributions since it helped shape how researchers study learning and memory.

Her career is also usually talked about in terms of the barriers she faced as a woman in psychology. Even though she finished all the requirements for a Ph.D. at Harvard, she was still denied the degree because of her gender, which shows how limited opportunities were for women at the time. Later on, though, she still made a lot of history by becoming the first woman president of both the American Psychological Association and the American Philosophical Association, which was a major accomplishment given the time period.

Calkins served as a faculty member at Wellesley College for forty years until she retired in 1929. Calkins died in 1930 after writing four books and over a hundred papers that are evenly divided between the fields of psychology and philosophy.

== Publications ==
=== Books ===
- 1888: Sharing the Profits, Ginn & Company.
- 1896: Association: An Essay Analytic and Experimental, Macmillan
- 1901: An Introduction to Psychology, The Macmillan Company.
- 1907: The Persistent Problems of Philosophy: An Introduction to Metaphysics Through the Study of Modern Systems, The Macmillan Company.
- 1909: A First Book in Psychology, The Macmillan Company
- 1918: The Good Man and the Good, The Macmillan Company

== See also ==
- American philosophy
- List of American philosophers
- Matilda effect
