= Structuralism (psychology) =

Theory of consciousness developed by Wilhelm Wundt and Edward Titchener

Structuralism in psychology (also structural psychology) is a theory of consciousness developed by Edward Bradford Titchener (1867–1927). This theory was challenged later in the 20th century.

Structuralists seek to analyze the adult mind (the total sum of experience from birth to the present) in terms of the simplest definable components of experience and then to find how these components fit together to form more complex experiences as well as how they correlate to physical events. To do this, structuralists employ introspection: self-reports of sensations, views, feelings, and emotions.

== Titchener ==
Edward B. Titchener is credited for the theory of structuralism. It is considered to be the first "school" of psychology. Because he was a student of Wilhelm Wundt at the University of Leipzig, Titchener's ideas on how the mind worked were heavily influenced by Wundt's theory of voluntarism and his ideas of association and apperception (the passive and active combinations of elements of consciousness respectively). Titchener attempted to classify the structures of the mind in a similar way to how chemists classify the elements of nature, into the nature.

Titchener said that only observable events constituted that science and that any speculation concerning unobservable events has no place in society (this view was similar to the one expressed by Ernst Mach). In his book Systematic Psychology Titchener wrote:

It is true, nevertheless, that observation is the single and proprietary method of science, and that experiment, regarded as a scientific method, is nothing else than observation safeguarded and assisted.

== Mind and consciousness ==
Titchener believed the mind was the accumulated experience of a lifetime. He believed that he could understand reasoning and the structure of the mind if he could define and categorize the basic components of mind and the rules by which the components interacted.

=== Introspection ===
The main tool Titchener used to try to determine the different components of consciousness was introspection. Titchener writes in his Systematic Psychology:

The state of consciousness which is to be the matter of psychology ... can become an object of immediate knowledge only by way of introspection or self-awareness.

and in his book An Outline of Psychology:

...within the sphere of psychology, introspection is the final and only court of appeal, that psychological evidence cannot be other than introspective evidence.

Titchener had very strict guidelines for the reporting of an introspective analysis. The subject would be presented with an object, such as a pencil. The subject would then report the characteristics of that pencil (e.g., color and length). The subject would be instructed not to report the name of the object (pencil) because that did not describe the raw data of what the subject was experiencing. Titchener referred to this as stimulus error.

In his translation of Wundt's work, Titchener illustrates Wundt as a supporter of introspection as a method through which to observe consciousness. However, introspection fits Wundt's theories only if the term is taken to refer to psychophysical methods.

Introspection literally means 'looking within', to try to describe a person's memory, perceptions, cognitive processes, and/or motivations.

=== Elements of the mind ===
Structuralists believe that our consciousness is composed of individual parts which contribute to overall structure and function of the mind. Titchener's theory began with the question of what each element of the mind is. He concluded from his research that there were three types of mental elements constituting conscious experience: Sensations (elements of perceptions), Images (elements of ideas), and affections (elements of emotions). These elements could be broken down into their respective properties, which he determined were quality, intensity, duration, clearness, and extensity. Both sensations and images contained all of these qualities; however, affections were lacking in both clearness and extensity. And images and affections could be broken down further into just clusters of sensations. Therefore, by following this train of thinking all thoughts were images, which being constructed from elementary sensations meant that all complex reasoning and thought could eventually be broken down into just the sensations which he could get at through introspection.

=== Interaction of elements ===
The second issue in Titchener's theory of structuralism was the question of how the mental elements combined and interacted with each other to form conscious experience. His conclusions were largely based on ideas of associationism. In particular, Titchener focuses on the law of contiguity, which is the idea that the thought of something will tend to cause thoughts of things that are usually experienced along with it.

Titchener rejected Wundt's notions of apperception and creative synthesis (voluntary action), which were the basis of Wundt's voluntarism. Titchener argued that attention was simply a manifestation of the "clearness" property within sensation.

=== Physical and mental relationship ===
Once Titchener identified the elements of mind and their interaction, his theory then asked the question of why the elements interact in the way they do. In particular, Titchener was interested in the relationship between the conscious experience and the physical processes. Titchener believed that the physical processes provide a continuous substratum that gives psychological processes a continuity they otherwise would not have. Therefore, the nervous system does not cause conscious experience, but can be used to explain some characteristics of mental events.

== Wundt and structuralism ==
Wilhelm Wundt instructed Titchener, the founder of structuralism, at the University of Leipzig. The 'science of immediate experience' was stated by him. This simply means that the complex perceptions can be raised through basic sensory information. Wundt is often associated in past literature with structuralism and the use of similar introspective methods. Wundt makes a clear distinction between pure introspection, which is the relatively unstructured self-observation used by earlier philosophers, and experimental introspection. Wundt believes this type of introspection to be acceptable since it uses laboratory instruments to vary conditions and make results of internal perceptions more precise.

The reason for this confusion lies in the translation of Wundt's writings. When Titchener brought his theory to America, he also brought with him Wundt's work. Titchener translated these works for the American audience, and in doing so misinterpreted Wundt's meaning. He then used this translation to show that Wundt supported his own theories. In fact, Wundt's main theory was that of psychological voluntarism (psychologischer Voluntarismus), the doctrine that the power of the will organizes the mind's content into higher-level thought processes.

== Criticisms ==
Structuralism has faced a large amount of criticism, particularly from functionalism, the school of psychology which later evolved into the psychology of pragmatism (reconvening introspection into acceptable practices of observation). The main critique of structuralism was its focus on introspection as the method by which to gain an understanding of conscious experience. Critics argue that self-analysis was not feasible, since introspective students cannot appreciate the processes or mechanisms of their own mental processes. Introspection, therefore, yielded different results depending on who was using it and what they were seeking. Some critics also pointed out that introspective techniques actually resulted in retrospection – the memory of a sensation rather than the sensation itself.

Behaviorists, specifically methodological behaviorists, fully rejected even the idea of the conscious experience as a worthy topic in psychology, since they believed that the subject matter of scientific psychology should be strictly operationalized in an objective and measurable way. Because the notion of a mind could not be objectively measured, it was not worth further inquiry. However, radical behaviorism includes thinking, feeling, and private events in its theory and analysis of psychology. Structuralism also believes that the mind could be dissected into its individual parts, which then formed conscious experience. This also received criticism from the Gestalt school of psychology, which argues that the mind cannot be broken down into individual elements.

Besides theoretical attacks, structuralism was criticized for excluding and ignoring important developments happening outside of structuralism. For instance, structuralism did not concern itself with the study of animal behavior, and personality.

Titchener himself was criticized for not using his psychology to help answer practical problems. Instead, Titchener was interested in seeking pure knowledge that to him was more important than commonplace issues.

== Alternatives ==
One alternative theory to structuralism, to which Titchener took offense, was functionalism (functional psychology). Functionalism was developed by William James in contrast to structuralism. It stressed the importance of empirical, rational thought over an experimental, trial-and-error philosophy. James in his theory included introspection (i.e., the psychologist's study of his own states of mind), but also included things like analysis (i.e., the logical criticism of precursor and contemporary views of the mind), experiment (e.g., in hypnosis or neurology), and comparison (i.e., the use of statistical means to distinguish norms from anomalies) which gave it somewhat of an edge. Functionalism also differed in that it focused on the how useful certain processes were in the brain to the environment you were in and not the processes and other detail like in structuralism.

== Contemporary structuralism ==
Researchers are still working to offer objective experimental approaches to measuring conscious experience, in particular within the field of cognitive psychology, which is in some ways carrying on the torch of Titchener's ideas. It is working on the same type of issues such as sensations and perceptions. Today, any introspective methodologies are done under highly controlled situations and are understood to be subjective and retrospective. Proponents argue that psychology can still gain useful information from using introspection in this case.

== See also ==
- Association of ideas
- Associationism
- Mentalism (psychology)
- History of psychology
- Nature
