= American Journal of Psychology =

- Discipline: Psychology
- Language: English
- Edited by: Robert W Proctor

Publication details
- History: 1887–present
- Publisher: University of Illinois Press (US)
- Frequency: Quarterly
- Impact factor: 1.063 (2018)

Standard abbreviations
- ISO 4: Am. J. Psychol.

Indexing
- CODEN: AJPCAA
- ISSN: 0002-9556 (print); 1939-8298 (web)
- LCCN: 05035765
- JSTOR: 00029556
- OCLC no.: 38376431

Links
- Journal homepage

The American Journal of Psychology is an academic journal devoted primarily to experimental psychology. It is the first such journal to be published in the English language (though Mind, founded in 1876, published some experimental psychology earlier). AJP was founded by the Johns Hopkins University psychologist Granville Stanley Hall in 1887, the first president of APA and Clark University. The journal continued after the 4th president of the Society for the History of Psychology Karl Dallenbach bought the journal from Hall and was its editor for more than forty years.

This quarterly journal has distributed several groundbreaking papers in psychology, for example Charles Spearman's " 'General Intelligence,' Objectively Determined and Measured" (1904) or Mary Caulkins's "Experimental Psychology at Wellesley College" (1892). The AJP investigates the science of behavior and the mind, releasing reports of original research based on experimental psychology, theoretical presentations, combined theoretical and experimental analyses, historical commentaries, and detailed reviews of well-known books.

== Abstracting and indexing ==
The journal is abstracted and indexed in Academic ASAP, JSTOR, BIOSIS, and Scopus.
