= Edward B. Titchener =

English-American psychologist (1867–1927)

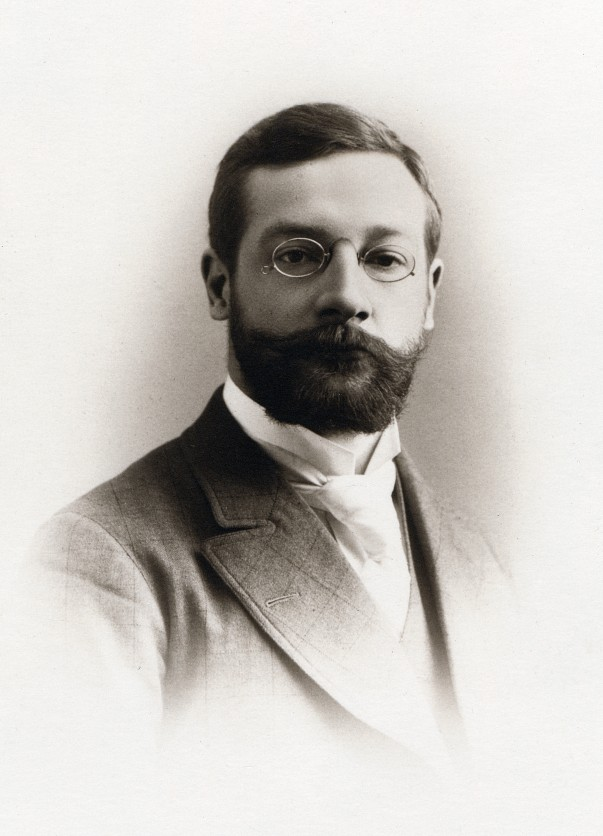
- Born: Edward Bradford Titchener; 11 January 1867; Chichester, England
- Died: 3 August 1927 (aged 60); Ithaca, New York, U.S.
- Education: Brasenose College, Oxford (MA, DSc); University of Leipzig (Dr. rer. nat.)
- Known for: Structuralism; empathy; introspection
- Spouse: Sophie Bedloe Kellogg (m. 1894)
- Scientific career
- Fields: Psychology
- Workplaces: Cornell University
- Doctoral advisor: Wilhelm Wundt
- Doctoral students: Edwin Garrigues Boring; Walter Bowers Pillsbury; Margaret Floy Washburn

Edward Bradford Titchener (11 January 1867 – 3 August 1927) was an English psychologist who studied under Wilhelm Wundt for several years. Titchener is best known for creating his version of psychology that described the structure of the mind: structuralism. After becoming a professor at Cornell University, he created the largest doctoral program at that time in the United States. His first graduate student, Margaret Floy Washburn, became the first woman to be granted a PhD in psychology (1894).

== Education and early life ==
Titchener's parents, Alice Field Habin and John Titchener, eloped to marry in 1869 and his mother was disowned by her prominent Sussex family. His father held a series of posts as a clerk or in accountancy before dying of tuberculosis in 1879. The family, of five surviving children (4 girls, 1 boy), moved at least 10 times during this time. When he was 9, Titchener was sent to live with his paternal grandparents and two aunts. His namesake grandfather was a successful solicitor and investor and also an ex-mayor of Chichester. He ensured that Titchener was first privately tutored and then given a grammar school education. However, his investments collapsed in 1881 and he died a few months later. In the reduced financial circumstances, Titchener's subsequent education was funded by scholarships, paid employment and entrepreneurial activities.

Titchener attended The Prebendal School and Malvern College and then went on to Oxford (Brasenose College) from 1885 to 1890. He graduated with a rare 'double first' BA degree in classics in 1889. His interests began to change to biology. At Oxford, Titchener first began to read the works of Wilhelm Wundt. During his time at Oxford, Titchener translated the first volume of the third edition of Wundt's book Principles of Physiological Psychology from German into English. He spent an extra year at Oxford in 1890, working with John Scott Burdon-Sanderson, a physiologist to learn scientific methodology. Titchener went on to Leipzig in Germany to study with Wundt in autumn 1890. He completed his doctoral program in 1892 with a dissertation on binocular vision. In summer 1892, he returned to Oxford and Burdon-Sanderson where he taught in the Oxford Summer School.

In autumn 1892, Titchener joined the Sage School of Philosophy at Cornell University as an untenured lecturer teaching philosophy and psychology. He developed a psychology laboratory, gained editing positions and in 1895 gained tenure, a full professorship and independence from the Sage School. He taught his views on the ideas of Wundt to his students in the form of structuralism.

== Personal life ==
Titchener was married in 1894 to Sophie Bedloe Kellogg, a public school teacher from Maine. They had four children (3 girls, 1 boy). Once Titchener had a position at Cornell he gave financial support to his mother for the rest of his life. She, and his sisters, had lived in difficult circumstances after the death of his father, with his sisters spending time in an orphanage and then entering domestic service.

== Main ideas ==
Titchener's ideas on how the mind worked were heavily influenced by Wundt's theory of voluntarism and his ideas of association and apperception (the passive and active combinations of elements of consciousness respectively). Titchener attempted to classify the structures of the mind in the way a chemist breaks down chemicals into their component parts—water into hydrogen and oxygen, for example. Thus, for Titchener, just as hydrogen and oxygen were structures, so were sensations and thoughts. He conceived of hydrogen and oxygen as structures of a chemical compound, and sensations and thoughts as structures of the mind. A sensation, according to Titchener, had four distinct properties: intensity, quality, duration, and extent. Each of these related to some corresponding quality of stimulus, although some stimuli were insufficient to provoke their relevant aspect of sensation. He further differentiated particular types of sensations: auditory sensation, for example, he divided into "tones" and "noises". Ideas and perceptions he considered to be formed from sensations; "ideational type" was related to the type of sensation on which an idea was based, e.g., sound or vision, a spoken conversation or words on a page.

Titchener believed that if the basic components of the mind could be defined and categorised that the structure of mental processes and higher thinking could be determined. What each element of the mind is, how those elements interact with each other and why they interact in the ways that they do was the basis of reasoning that Titchener used in trying to find structure to the mind.

=== Introspection ===
The main tool that Titchener used to try to determine the different components of consciousness was introspection. Unlike Wundt's method of introspection, Titchener had very strict guidelines for the reporting of an introspective analysis. The subject would be presented with an object, such as a pencil. The subject would then report the characteristics of that pencil (color, length, etc.). The subject would be instructed not to report the name of the object (pencil) because that did not describe the raw data of what the subject was experiencing. Titchener referred to this as stimulus error.

In "Experimental Psychology: A Manual of Laboratory Practice", Titchener detailed the procedures of his introspective methods precisely. As the title suggests, the manual was meant to encompass all of experimental psychology despite its focus on introspection. To Titchener, there could be no valid psychological experiments outside of introspection, and he opened the section "Directions to Students" with the following definition: "A psychological experiment consists of an introspection or a series of introspections made under standard conditions."

This manual of Titchener's provided students with in-depth outlines of procedure for experiments on optical illusions, Weber's Law, visual contrast, after-images, auditory and olfactory sensations, perception of space, ideas, and associations between ideas, as well as descriptions proper behaviour during experiments and general discussion of psychological concepts. Titchener wrote another instructive manual for students and two more for instructors in the field (Hothersall 2004, p. 142). The level of detail Titchener put into these manuals reflected his devotion to a scientific approach to psychology. He argued that all measurements were simply agreed-upon "conventions" and subscribed to the belief that psychological phenomena, too, could be systematically measured and studied. Titchener put great stock in the systematic work of Gustav Fechner, whose psychophysics advanced the notion that it was indeed possible to measure mental phenomena (Titchener 1902, p. cviii- cix).

The majority of experiments were to be performed by two trained researchers working together, one functioning as the "observer" (O) and the other as the "experimenter" (E). The experimenter would set up the experiment and record the introspection made by his partner. After the first run of any experiment, the researchers were to then switch roles and repeat the experiment. Titchener placed a great deal of emphasis on the importance of harmony and communication between the two memberships in these partnerships. Communication, in particular, was necessary, because illness or agitation on the part of the observer could affect the outcome of any given experiment.

The structuralist method gradually faded away due to the advent of newer approaches such as the introspective approach.

=== Attention ===
Edward B. Titchener formulated his seven fundamental laws of attention. Law number four, the law of prior entry, postulated that "the object of attention comes to consciousness more quickly than the objects which we are not attending to." (Titchener, 1908, p. 251) The law of prior entry has received a lot of interest over the last century and much debate ensued about the veracity of this law. It is not until recently that research has generated robust evidence that attention operates at a perceptual level. Behavioral studies looking at the speed of perception of attended stimuli suggest that the law of prior entry holds true. Recent brain imaging studies have been able to confirm these findings by showing that attention can speed up perceptual brain activation.

== Life and legacy ==
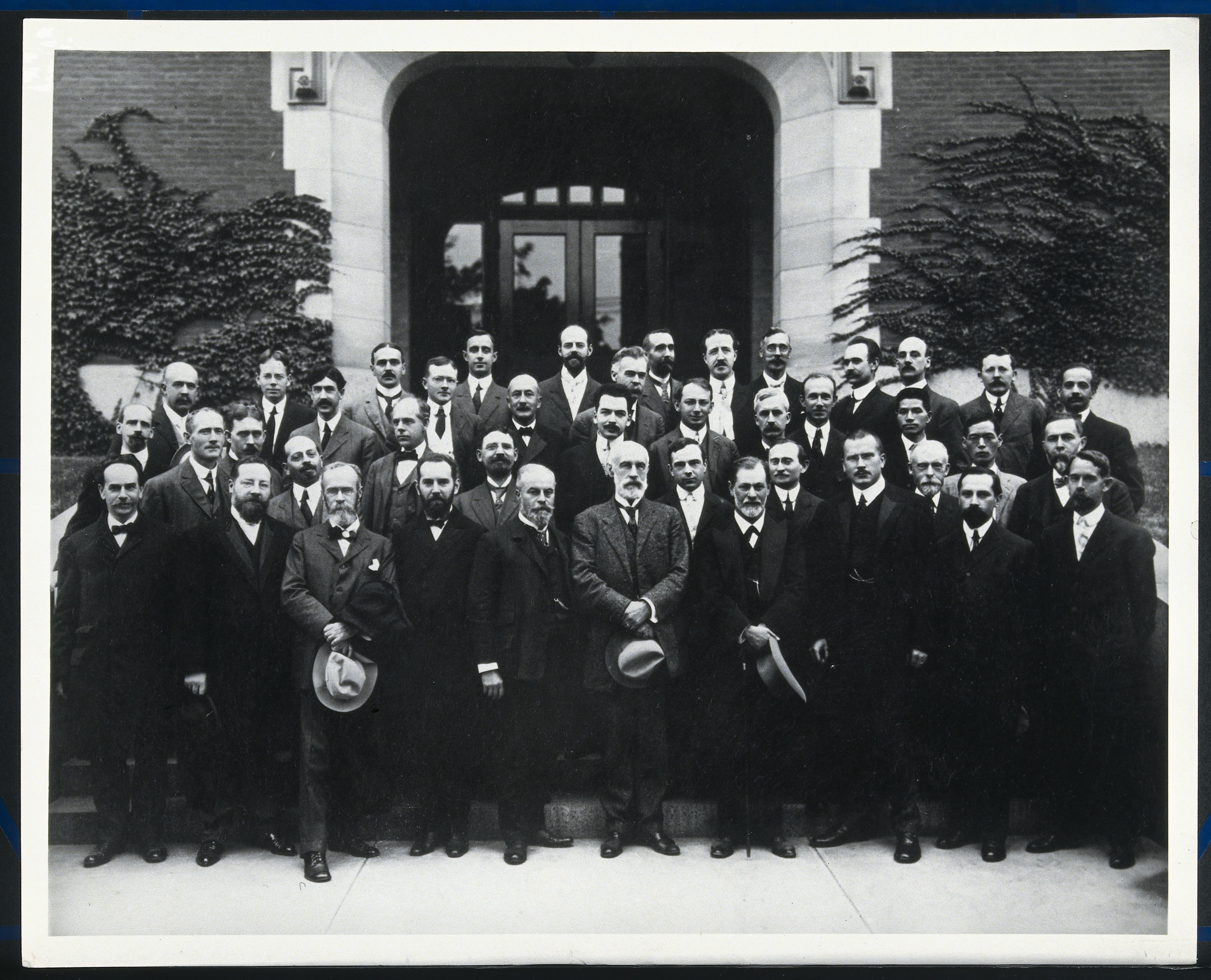
Edward B. Titchener (first row, second from the left) with fellow psychoanalysts

Titchener was a charismatic and forceful speaker. However, although his idea of structuralism thrived while he was alive and championing for it, structuralism did not live on after his death. Some modern reflections on Titchener consider the narrow scope of his psychology and the strict, limited methodology he deemed acceptable as a prominent explanation for the fall of Titchener's structuralism after his death. So much of it was wrapped up in Titchener's precise, careful dictations that without him, the field floundered. Structuralism, along with Wundt's voluntarism, were both effectively challenged and improved upon, though they did influence many schools of psychology today.

Titchener was known for bringing some part of Wundt's structuralism to America, but with a few modifications. For example, whereas Wilhelm Wundt emphasised the relationship between elements of consciousness, Titchener focused on identifying the basic elements themselves. In his textbook An Outline of Psychology (1896), Titchener put forward a list of more than 44,000 elemental qualities of conscious experience.

Titchener is also remembered for coining the English word "empathy" in 1909 as a translation of the German word "Einfühlungsvermögen", a new phenomenon explored at the end of 19th century mainly by Theodor Lipps. "Einfühlungsvermögen" was later re-translated as "Empathie", and is still in use that way in German. It should be stressed that Titchener used the term "empathy" in a personal way, strictly intertwined with his methodological use of introspection, and to refer to at least three differentiable phenomena.

Titchener's effect on the history of psychology, as it is taught in classrooms, was partially the work of his student Edwin Boring. Boring's experimental work was largely unremarkable, but his book History of Experimental Psychology was widely influential, as, consequentially, were his portrayals of various psychologists, including his own mentor Edward Titchener. The length at which Boring detailed Titchener's contributions—contemporary Hugo Münsterberg received roughly a tenth as much of Boring's attention—raise questions today as to whether or not the influence credited to Titchener on the history of psychology is inflated as a result. Boring recorded that Titchener had supervised 56 doctoral students, including 21 women. Two others did not formally graduate due to personal circumstances.

Another student who brought attention to Titchener's laboratory was Cheves West Perky (1874–1940), an American psychologist who performed the "Banana Experiment" in 1910, which led to the discovery of the Perky Effect, which examines the link between mental imagery and visual perception. Perky's work has since "achieved something of a classic, even mythic, status in the literature on imagery."

Professor Titchener received honorary degrees from Harvard, Clark, and Wisconsin. He became a charter member of the American Psychological Association, translated Külpe's Outlines of Psychology and other works, became the American editor of Mind in 1894, and associate editor of the American Journal of Psychology in 1895, and wrote several books. In 1904, he founded the group "The Experimentalists", which continues today as the "Society of Experimental Psychologists". He was elected to the American Philosophical Society in 1906. Titchener's brain was contributed to the Wilder Brain Collection at Cornell University.
