= Mathura Lok Sabha constituency =

Lok Sabha Constituency in Uttar Pradesh, India

Coordinates: 27.48°N 77.69°E

Mathura UP-17
- Lok Sabha constituency
- Interactive Map Outlining Mathura Lok Sabha constituency

Constituency details
- Country: India
- Region: North India
- State: Uttar Pradesh
- Assembly constituencies: Chhata; Mant; Goverdhan; Mathura; Baldev
- Established: 1952
- Total electors: 19,29,550
- Reservation: None

Member of Parliament
- 18th Lok Sabha
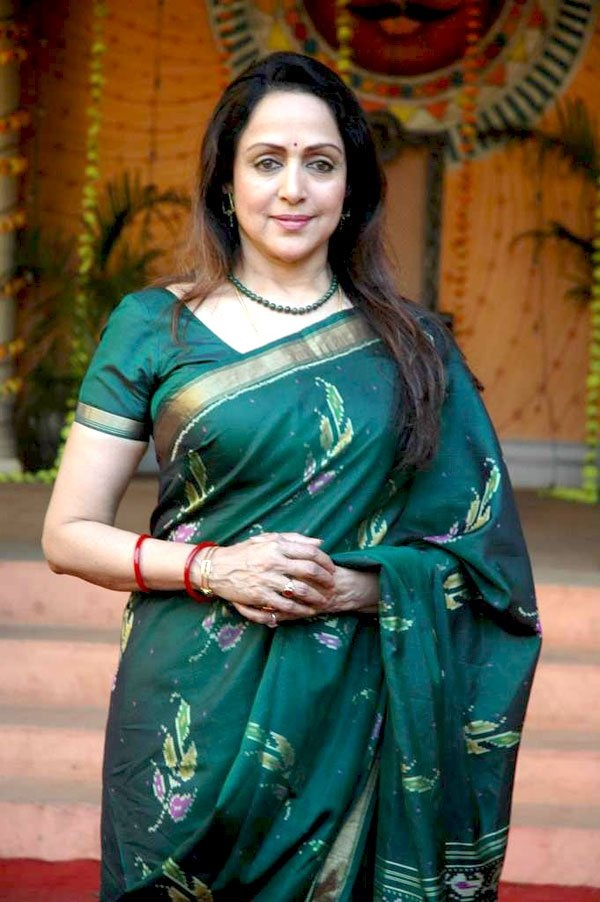
- Incumbent Hema Malini
- Party: BJP
- Alliance: NDA
- Elected year: 2024
- Preceded by: Jayant Chaudhary; RLD

Mathura Lok Sabha constituency (Hindi pronunciation: [mət̪ʰʊɾaː]) is one of the 80 Lok Sabha (parliamentary) constituencies in the Indian state of Uttar Pradesh. This constituency covers the entire Mathura district. According to Election Commission of India 2009 reports, the Mathura Parliamentary constituency (constituency number 17) has a total of 1,341,649 electorates out of which 593,726 are females and 747,923 are males.

== Assembly segments ==
Presently, Mathura Lok Sabha constituency comprises five Vidhan Sabha (Uttar Pradesh legislative assembly) segments.

No	Name	District	Member	Party	2024 Lead
81	Chhata	Mathura	Laxmi Narayan Chaudhary	BJP	BJP
82	Mant	Mathura	Rajesh Chaudhary	BJP	BJP
83	Goverdhan	Mathura	Meghshyam Singh	BJP	BJP
84	Mathura	Mathura	Shrikant Sharma	BJP	BJP
85	Baldev (SC)	Mathura	Pooran Prakash	BJP	BJP

== Members of Parliament ==
Year	Member	Party
1952	Girraj Saran Singh	Independent
1957	Raja Mahendra Pratap	Independent
1962	Chaudhary Digambar Singh	Indian National Congress
1967	Chaudhary Digambar Singh	Indian National Congress
1971	Chakleshwar Singh	Indian National Congress
1977	Mani Ram Bagri	Janata Party
1980	Chaudhary Digambar Singh	Janata Party (Secular)
1984	Manvendra Singh	Indian National Congress
1989	Manvendra Singh	Janata Dal
1991	Sakshi Maharaj	Bharatiya Janata Party
1996	Chaudhary Tejveer Singh	Bharatiya Janata Party
1998	Chaudhary Tejveer Singh	Bharatiya Janata Party
1999	Chaudhary Tejveer Singh	Bharatiya Janata Party
2004	Manvendra Singh	Indian National Congress
2009	Jayant Chaudhary	Rashtriya Lok Dal
2014	Hema Malini	Bharatiya Janata Party
2019	Hema Malini	Bharatiya Janata Party
2024	Hema Malini	Bharatiya Janata Party

== Election results ==
=== 2024 Lok Sabha Elections ===
Vote share of Winning candidates
2024	53.29%
2019	60.87%
2014	53.29%
2009	52.29%
2004	32.68%
1999	39.65%
1998	49.1%
1996	33.91%
1991	33.0%
1989	48.6%
1984	58.0%
1980	47.7%
1977	75.6%
1971	39.3%
1957	40.68%

2024 Indian general elections: Mathura
Party	Candidate	Votes	%	±%
BJP	Hema Malini	510,064	53.29	▼7.58
INC	Mukesh Dhangar	2,16,657	22.63	▲20.08
BSP	Chaudhary Suresh Singh	1,88,417	19.69	▲19.69
NOTA	None of the Above	4,563	0.48	▼0.05
Majority		2,93,407	30.66	▲4.05
Turnout		9,57,046	49.60	▼13.47
Registered electors		19,29,550		
BJP hold		Swing	▼7.58	

=== 2019 Lok Sabha Elections ===
2019 Indian general elections: Mathura
Party	Candidate	Votes	%	±%
BJP	Hema Malini	671,293	60.87	▲7.58
RLD	Kunwar Narendra Singh	3,77,822	34.26	▲11.64
INC	Mahesh Pathak	28,084	2.55	▲2.55
NOTA	None of the Above	5800	0.53	▲0.35
Majority		2,93,471	26.61	▼4.06
Turnout		11,02,731	63.07	▼1.03
Registered electors		17,48,275		
BJP hold		Swing	▲7.58	

=== 2014 Lok Sabha Election ===
2014 Indian general elections: Mathura
Party	Candidate	Votes	%	±%
BJP	Hema Malini	674,633	53.29	▲53.29
RLD	Jayant Chaudhary	2,43,890	22.62	▼29.67
BSP	Vivek Nigam	73,572	16.10	▼12.84
SP	Dinesh Kardam	36,673	3.40	▲3.40
Independent	Sandeep Kumar	158	0.94	▲0.94
NOTA	None of the Above	1,953	0.18	▲0.18
Majority		4,30,743	30.67	▲7.32
Turnout		10,78,331	64.10	▲9.95
BJP gain from RLD		Swing	▲53.29	

=== 2009 ===
2009 Indian general election: Mathura
Party	Candidate	Votes	%	±%
RLD	Jayant Chaudhary	379,870	52.29	
BSP	Shyam Sunder Sharma	2,10,257	28.94	
INC	Manvendra Singh	85,418	11.76	
NLHP	Ashraf Ali	22,623	3.11	
Independent	9 Independent Candidates	23,927	3.29	
Others	3 Other Party Candidates	4,398	0.60	
Majority		1,69,613	23.35	
Turnout				
Swing to RLD from BSP		Swing		

=== 2004 ===
2004 Indian general election: Mathura
Party	Candidate	Votes	%	±%
INC	Manvendra Singh	187,400	31.12	
BSP	Chaudhary Laxmi Narayan Singh	1,49,268	24.79	
RLD	Dr. Gyanvati Singh	1,44,366	23.97	
BJP	Chaudhary Tejveer Singh	1,03,007	17.11	
Others	2 Other Party Candidates	4,708	0.78	
Independent	10 Independent Candidates	13,438	2.23	
Majority		38,132	6.33	
Turnout				
Swing to INC from BSP		Swing		

=== 1999 ===
1999 Indian general election: Mathura
Party	Candidate	Votes	%	±%
BJP	Chaudhary Tejveer Singh	210,212	39.65	
RLD	Rameshwar Singh	1,68,485	31.78	
BSP	Pt. Kamal Kant Upmanyu	1,18,720	22.39	
SP	Chaudhary Hari Singh Rawat	19,816	3.74	
Independent	5 Independent Candidates	6,447	1.23	
Others	3 Other Party Candidates	6,476	1.22	
Majority		41,727	7.87	
Turnout		5,40,511	45.94	
Swing to BJP from RLD		Swing		

=== 1998 ===
1998 Indian general election: Mathura
Party	Candidate	Votes	%	±%
BJP	Chaudhary Tejveer Singh	303,831	49.10	
BSP	Pooran Prakash	1,13,801	18.39	
SP	Manvendra Singh	1,03,041	16.65	
INC	Mahesh Pathak	61,952	10.01	
BKKGP	Roshan Singh	23,033	3.72	
AD	Ranveer Singh	1,648	0.27	
Independent	6 Independent Candidates	11,444	1.85	
Majority		1,90,030	30.71	
Turnout				
Swing to BJP from BSP		Swing		

=== 1996 ===
1996 Indian general election: Mathura
Party	Candidate	Votes	%	±%
BJP	Chaudhary Tejveer Singh	167,369	33.91	
INC	Chaudhary Laxmi Narayan Singh	1,02,797	20.83	
BSP	Sardar Singh	1,02,567	20.78	
AIIC(T)	Shyam Sunder Sharma	85,795	17.38	
JD	Debi Dass Vaghel	17,199	3.49	
FL	Mohan	1,101	0.22	
JP	Pramod Kumar	367	0.07	
IC(S)	Sahib Singh	232	0.05	
SS	Ram Babu	258	0.05	
Independent	33 Independent Candidates	15,817	3.20	
Majority		64,572	13.08	
Turnout				
Swing to BJP from INC		Swing		

=== 1991 ===
1991 Indian general election: Mathura
Party	Candidate	Votes	%	±%
BJP	Sakshi Maharaj	156,523	34.30	
JD	Chaudhary Laxmi Narayan Singh	1,41,011	30.90	
INC	Vishwendra Singh	1,02,385	22.43	
BSP	Bhagwan Singh	26,107	5.72	
JP	Kishan Singh	16,397	3.59	
Independent	15 Independent Candidates	11,740	2.58	
Others	3 Other Party Candidates	2,227	0.48	
Majority		15,512	3.40	
Turnout				
Swing to BJP from JD		Swing		

=== 1989 ===
1989 Indian general election: Mathura
Party	Candidate	Votes	%	±%
JD	Manvendra Singh	233,318	50.32	
INC	Natwar Singh	1,95,605	42.19	
Independent	Gir Raj Singh	15,949	3.44	
DDP	Mohan	4,277	0.92	
Independent	6 Independent Candidates	14,529	3.14	
Majority		37,713	8.13	
Turnout		4,80,088	51.32	
Swing to JD from INC		Swing		

=== 1984 ===
1984 Indian general election: Mathura
Party	Candidate	Votes	%	±%
INC	Manvendra Singh	263,248	58.69	
LKD	Gayatree Devi	1,59,848	35.64	
Independent	Raghubir Singh	13,930	3.11	
DDP	Anek Singh	1,240	0.28	
Independent	10 Independent Candidates	10,298	2.32	
Majority		1,03,400	23.05	
Turnout				
Swing to INC from LKD		Swing		

=== 1980 ===
1980 Indian general election: Mathura
Party	Candidate	Votes	%	±%
JP(S)	Chaudhary Digamber Singh	166,774	48.94	
INC(I)	Acharya Laxmi Raman	84,111	24.68	
JP	Radhey Shyam Sharma	68,204	20.01	
Independent	Yogendra Kumar	4,191	1.23	
INC(U)	Tula Ram Singh	2,338	0.69	
Independent	14 Independent Candidates	15,166	4.45	
Majority		82,663	24.26	
Turnout				
Swing to JP(S) from INC(I)		Swing		

=== 1977 ===
1977 Indian general election: Mathura
Party	Candidate	Votes	%	±%
JP	Maniram	296,518	76.79	
INC	Ramhet Singh	81,253	21.04	
Independent	Ramesh Chandra	5,060	1.31	
Independent	Shreedhar Goswami	3,293	0.85	
Majority		2,15,265	55.75	
Turnout		3,92,137	62.80	
Swing to JP from INC		Swing		

=== 1971 ===
1971 Indian general election: Mathura
Party	Candidate	Votes	%	±%
INC	Chakleshwar Singh	111,864	40.13	
BKD	Digamber Singh Chaudhari	90,425	32.44	
INC(O)	Vrijendra Keshoraiya	42,166	15.13	
Independent	Dragpal Singh	12,585	4.52	
Independent	Gyanendra Swarup	11,257	4.04	
Independent	Bedran	4,030	1.45	
Independent	Nand Lal Sharma	2,672	0.96	
Independent	Ganga Prasad	2,129	0.76	
Independent	Nandan Singh	1,593	0.57	
Majority		21,439	7.69	
Turnout		2,84,354	50.48	
Swing to INC from BKD		Swing		

=== 1962 ===
1962 Indian general election: Mathura
Party	Candidate	Votes	%	±%
INC	Chaudhari Digamber Singh	78,062	32.87	
Independent	Raja Mahendra Pratap	51,178	21.55	
ABJS	Rameshwar Dass	37,327	15.72	
Socialist	Radhey Shyam	29,269	12.32	
RPI	Bed Ram	26,543	11.18	
Independent	Pooran	8,157	3.43	
RRP	Swami Ram Hari Dass	6,955	2.93	
Majority		26,884	11.32	
Turnout		2,49,016	54.27	
Swing to INC from Independent		Swing		

=== 1957 ===
1957 Indian general election: Mathura
Party	Candidate	Votes	%	±%
Independent	Raja Mahendra Pratap	95,202	40.68	
INC	Digamber Singh	69,209	29.57	
Independent	Pooran	29,177	12.47	
ABJS	Atal Behari Bajpai	23,620	10.09	
Independent	Sugrib Singh	8,993	3.84	
Independent	Shankar Rao	7,818	3.34	
Majority		25,993	11.11	
Turnout		2,34,019	55.27	
Independent hold		Swing		

== See also ==
- Mathura district
- List of constituencies of the Lok Sabha
