= Farrukhabad Lok Sabha constituency =

Lok Sabha constituency in Uttar Pradesh

Coordinates: 27.41°N 79.48°E

farrukhabad UP-40
- Lok Sabha constituency
- Interactive Map Outlining Farrukhabad Lok Sabha constituency

Constituency details
- Country: India
- Region: North India
- State: Uttar Pradesh
- Assembly constituencies: Aliganj; Kaimganj; Amritpur; Farrukhabad; Bhojpur
- Established: 1952
- Reservation: None

Member of Parliament
- 18th Lok Sabha
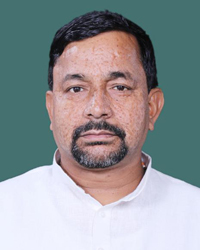
- Incumbent Mukesh Rajput
- Party: BJP
- Alliance: NDA
- Elected year: 2024

Farrukhabad Lok Sabha constituency is one of the 80 Lok Sabha (parliamentary) constituencies in Uttar Pradesh state in northern India. This constituency covers the entire Farrukhabad district

== Assembly segments ==
Presently, Farrukhabad Lok Sabha constituency comprises the following five Vidhan Sabha (legislative assembly) segments:

No	Name	District	Member	Party	2024 Lead
103	Aliganj	Etah	Satyapal Singh Rathore	BJP	SP
192	Kaimganj (SC)	Farrukhabad	Surabhi Singh	AD(S)	SP
193	Amritpur	Farrukhabad	Sushil Kumar Shakya	BJP	BJP
194	Farrukhabad	Farrukhabad	Sunil Dutt Dwivedi	BJP	BJP
195	Bhojpur	Farrukhabad	Nagendra Singh Rathore	BJP	BJP

== Members of Parliament ==
Year	Member	Party
1952	Mulchand Dube (Note: (Farrukhabad (North))	Indian National Congress
1952	Venkatesh Narayan Tiwary (Note: Farrukhabad (South))	Indian National Congress
1957	Mulchand Dube	Indian National Congress
1962	Mulchand Dube	Indian National Congress
1962^	Ram Manohar Lohia	Samyukta Socialist Party
1967	Awadhesh Chandra Singh Rathore	Indian National Congress
1971	Awadhesh Chandra Singh Rathore	Indian National Congress
1977	Daya Ram Shakya	Janata Party
1980	Daya Ram Shakya	Janata Party
1984	Khurshed Alam Khan	Indian National Congress
1989	Santosh Bhartiya	Janata Dal
1991	Salman Khurshid	Indian National Congress
1996	Sakshi Maharaj	Bharatiya Janata Party
1998	Sakshi Maharaj	Bharatiya Janata Party
1999	Chandra Bhushan Singh	Samajwadi Party
2004	Chandra Bhushan Singh	Samajwadi Party
2009	Salman Khurshid	Indian National Congress
2014	Mukesh Rajput	Bharatiya Janata Party
2019	Mukesh Rajput	Bharatiya Janata Party
2024	Mukesh Rajput	Bharatiya Janata Party

^ by poll

== Election results ==
Vote share of Winning candidates
2024	47.20%
2019	56.82%
2014	41.85%
2009	27.72%
2004	26.47%
1999	35.23%
1998	31.75%
1996	39.60%
1991	29.54%
1989	32.36%
1984	52.48%
1980	22.68%
1977	71.32%
1971	39.84%
1967	35.68%
1962 by-poll	0.00%
1962	32.96%
1957	38.80%
1952	51.25%
1952	50.32%

=== 2024 ===
2024 Indian general election: Farrukhabad
Party	Candidate	Votes	%	±%
BJP	Mukesh Rajput	487,963	47.20	▼9.62
SP	Naval Kishor Shakya	485,285	46.94	
BSP	Kranti Pandey	45,390	4.39	▼30.33
NOTA	None of the Above	4,365	0.42	▼0.32
IND	Harnandan Singh	2,469	0.24	
OTH	4 Other Party Candidates	8,322	0.80	
Majority		2,678	0.26	▼21.84
Turnout		1,033,794	59.17	▲0.45
BJP hold		Swing		

=== 2019 ===
2019 Indian general election: Farrukhabad
Party	Candidate	Votes	%	±%
BJP	Mukesh Rajput	569,880	56.82	▲14.97
BSP	Manoj Agarwal	348,178	34.72	▲22.92
INC	Salman Khurshid	55,258	5.51	▼4.33
NOTA	None of the Above	7,437	0.74	▲0.54
IND	2 Independent Candidates	7,625	0.76	
OTH	4 Other Party Candidates	14,575	1.45	
Majority		221,702	22.10	▲6.59
Turnout		1,003,241	58.72	▼1.43
BJP hold		Swing		

=== 2014 ===
2014 Indian general election: Farrukhabad
Party	Candidate	Votes	%	±%
BJP	Mukesh Rajput	406,195	41.85	▲22.55
SP	Rameshwar Singh Yadav	255,693	26.34	▲5.50
BSP	Jaiveer Singh	114,521	11.80	▼11.46
INC	Salman Khurshid	95,543	9.84	▼17.88
IND	Sachin Singh Yadav	58,703	6.05	
NOTA	None of the Above	1,986	0.20	
IND	11 Independent Candidates	26,358	2.72	
OTH	6 Other Party Candidates	11,678	1.20	
Majority		150,502	15.51	▲11.05
Turnout		970,749	60.15	▲13.37
BJP gain from INC		Swing		

=== 2009 ===
2009 Indian general election: Farrukhabad
Party	Candidate	Votes	%	±%
INC	Salman Khurshid	169,351	27.72	▲1.66
BSP	Naresh Chandra Agrawal	142,152	23.26	▲5.82
SP	Chandra Bhushan Singh	127,347	20.84	▼5.63
BJP	Mithlesh Kumari	117,951	19.30	▼1.16
RTKP	Sakshi Maharaj	30,855	5.05	
IND	4 Independent Candidates	10,191	1.67	
OTH	7 Other Party Candidates	13,168	2.16	
Majority		27,199	4.46	▲4.05
Turnout		611,015	46.78	
INC gain from SP		Swing		

=== 2004 ===
2004 Indian general election: Farrukhabad
Party	Candidate	Votes	%	±%
SP	Chandra Bhushan Singh	176,129	26.47	▼8.76
INC	Louise Khurshid	173,384	26.06	▲1.48
BJP	Mukesh Rajput	136,120	20.46	▼4.88
BSP	Nagendra Singh Shakya	116,046	17.44	▲4.67
IND	Sakshi Maharaj	41,349	6.21	
IND	6 Independent Candidates	11,002	1.65	
OTH	5 Other Party Candidates	11,405	1.71	
Majority		2,745	0.41	▼9.48
Turnout		665,435		
SP hold		Swing		

=== 1999 ===
1999 Indian general election: Farrukhabad
Party	Candidate	Votes	%	±%
SP	Chandra Bhushan Singh	222,984	35.23	▲8.04
BJP	R. B. S. Varma	160,422	25.34	▼6.41
INC	Louise Khursheed	155,601	24.58	▼0.93
BSP	Devendra Singh	80,837	12.77	▼2.30
IND	5 Independent Candidates	12,014	1.90	
OTH	2 Other Party Candidates	1,112	0.18	
Majority		62,562	9.89	▲5.33
Turnout		640,642	51.58	▼6.68
SP gain from BJP		Swing		

=== 1998 ===
1998 Indian general election: Farrukhabad
Party	Candidate	Votes	%	±%
BJP	Sumit kumar	224,636	31.75	▼7.85
SP	Arvind Pratap Singh	192,425	27.19	▲2.23
INC	Salman Khurshid	180,531	25.51	▲8.76
BSP	Shaitan Singh Shakya	106,612	15.07	▲1.48
IND	Lakhan Singh Katheriya	2,232	0.32	
IND	Hamid Hussain	872	0.12	
IND	Vidya Prakash Kureel	281	0.04	
Majority		32,211	4.56	▼10.08
Turnout		715,326	58.26	▲9.65
BJP hold		Swing		

=== 1996 ===
1996 Indian general election: Farrukhabad
Party	Candidate	Votes	%	±%
BJP	Sakshi Maharaj	229,906	39.60	▲18.83
SP	Anwar Md. Khan	144,928	24.96	
INC	Salman Khurshid	97,261	16.75	▼12.79
BSP	Santosh Bhartia	78,891	13.59	
AIIC(T)	Pratima Chaturvedi	5,626	0.97	
IND	35 Independent Candidates	22,947	3.95	
OTH	3 Other Party Candidates	1,012	0.17	
Majority		84,978	14.64	▲6.75
Turnout		590,001	48.61	▼3.35
BJP gain from SP		Swing		

=== 1991 ===
1991 Indian general election: Farrukhabad
Party	Candidate	Votes	%	±%
INC	Salman Khurshid	142,842	29.54	▼1.35
JP	Anwar Md. Khan	104,692	21.65	▲18.11
BJP	Virender Singh Katiyar	100,460	20.77	▼5.26
JD	Santosh Bhartiya	85,885	17.76	▼14.60
IND	Ashok Kumar	19,703	4.07	
LKD	Jageswar Prasad	6,238	1.29	
DDP	Sitaram	1,219	0.25	▼0.30
IND	20 Independent Candidates	22,541	4.66	
Majority		38,150	7.89	▲6.42
Turnout		498,644	51.96	▼3.76
INC gain from JD		Swing		

=== 1989 ===
1989 Indian general election: Farrukhabad
Party	Candidate	Votes	%	±%
JD	Santosh Bhartiya	165,452	32.36	
INC	Salman Khurshid	157,968	30.89	▼21.59
BJP	Dayaram Shakya	133,102	26.03	▲1.60
JP	Aswani Kumar	18,124	3.54	▲2.90
BSP	Ram Singh	16,559	3.24	
DDP	Ramesh Kumar	2,828	0.55	▼0.53
IND	7 Independent Candidates	17,281	3.38	
Majority		7,484	1.47	▼26.58
Turnout		531,687	55.72	▼3.50
JD gain from INC		Swing		

=== 1984 ===
1984 Indian general election: Farrukhabad
Party	Candidate	Votes	%	±%
INC	Khurshed Alam Khan	236,892	52.48	
BJP	Daya Ram Shakya	110,281	24.43	
LKD	Anwar Mohammad Khan	80,771	17.90	
DDP	Meghnath	4,854	1.08	
JP	Ram Krishan Yadav	2,909	0.64	▼22.04
IND	9 Independent Candidates	15,652	3.47	
Majority		126,611	28.05	▲26.26
Turnout		458,919	59.22	▲11.08
INC gain from JP		Swing		

=== 1980 ===
1980 Indian general election: Farrukhabad
Party	Candidate	Votes	%	±%
JP	Daya Ram Shakya	77,541	22.68	▼48.64
INC(I)	Siya Ram Gangwar	71,431	20.89	
JP(S)	Girish Chandra Katiyar	68,160	19.94	
IND	Anwar Mohammad	64,702	18.93	
INC(U)	Subedar Singh	35,373	10.35	
IND	Damodar Singh	4,841	1.42	
IND	Kamla Devi Kashyap	4,245	1.24	
IND	Man Singh	3,549	1.04	
IND	10 Independent Candidates	12,027	3.52	
Majority		6,110	1.79	▼48.71
Turnout		348,762	48.14	▼10.47
JP hold		Swing		

=== 1977 ===
1977 Indian general election: Farrukhabad
Party	Candidate	Votes	%	±%
JP	Daya Ram Shakya	263,287	71.32	
INC	Awdhesh Chandra Singh	76,862	20.82	▼19.02
IND	Subedar Singh	12,685	3.44	
RPI(K)	Sadiq Nawaz Khan	9,164	2.48	
IND	Virendra Kumar Dixit	3,953	1.07	
IND	Dev Narain	3,229	0.87	
Majority		186,425	50.50	▲38.67
Turnout		373,816	58.61	▲5.48
JP gain from INC		Swing		

=== 1971 ===
1971 Indian general election: Farrukhabad
Party	Candidate	Votes	%	±%
INC	Awadhesh Chandra Singh	114,077	39.84	▲4.16
BKD	Rajendra Singh Yadav	80,196	28.01	
ABJS	Daya Ram Shakya	69,242	24.18	▼2.68
IND	Man Singh	10,601	3.70	
IND	Jag Mohan Singh	5,790	2.02	
PBI	Pahup Singh	4,441	1.55	
IND	Anwar Bakht	1,972	0.69	
Majority		33,881	11.83	▲3.01
Turnout		291,901	53.13	▼3.67
INC hold		Swing		

=== 1967 ===
1967 Indian general election: Farrukhabad
Party	Candidate	Votes	%	±%
INC	Awadhesh Chandra Singh	99,835	35.68	
ABJS	Daya Ram Shakya	75,147	26.86	
SSP	B. R. Singh	36,257	12.96	
RPI	S. Sunder	23,437	8.38	
SWA	S. M. Ahmad	15,936	5.70	
IND	M. Singh	15,250	5.45	
IND	N. R. Dwidevi	13,918	4.97	
Majority		24,688	8.82	
Turnout		293,868	56.80	
INC gain from SSP		Swing		

=== 1962 ===
1962 Indian general election: Farrukhabad
Party	Candidate	Votes	%	±%
INC	Mul Chand	79,621	32.96	▼5.84
PSP	Bharat Singh Rathore	65,343	27.05	▼7.93
ABJS	Ram Prasad	49,047	20.31	▲7.82
RPI	Saktey Lal	21,331	8.83	
Socialist	Shiv Shankar Singh	10,926	4.52	
RRP	Ram Saran Singh	9,853	4.08	▼0.14
SWA	Prayag Narain	5,424	2.25	
Majority		14,278	5.91	▲2.09
Turnout		249,045	52.40	▼2.71
INC hold		Swing		

=== 1957 ===
1957 Indian general election: Farrukhabad
Party	Candidate	Votes	%	±%
INC	Mul Chand	96,301	38.80	
PSP	Bharat Singh	86,830	34.98	
ABJS	Kashmir Singh	31,013	12.49	
IND	Ganesh Prasad	23,613	9.51	
RRP	Kanchan Lal	10,467	4.22	
Majority		9,471	3.82	
Turnout		248,224	55.11	
INC win (new seat)				

=== 1952 ===
1951–52 Indian general election: Farrukhabad District (North)
Party	Candidate	Votes	%	±%
INC	Mool Chand Dube	86,024	51.25	
Socialist	Tej Narain	37,939	22.60	
UPPP	Kedar Nath Singh	28,006	16.69	
ABJS	Kunwar Bihari Lal	15,867	9.45	
Majority		48,085	28.65	
Turnout		167,836	41.21	
INC win (new seat)				

1951–52 Indian general election: Kanpur District North cum Farrukhabad District South
Party	Candidate	Votes	%	±%
INC	V. N. Tiwari	83,859	50.32	
Socialist	P. D. Katiyar	54,943	32.97	
IND	Govardhan Lal	20,593	12.36	
HM	Bal Ravindra Nath	7,240	4.34	
Majority		28,916	17.35	
Turnout		166,635	45.57	
INC win (new seat)				

== See also ==
- Farrukhabad district
- List of constituencies of the Lok Sabha
