= Sakshi Maharaj =

Indian politician

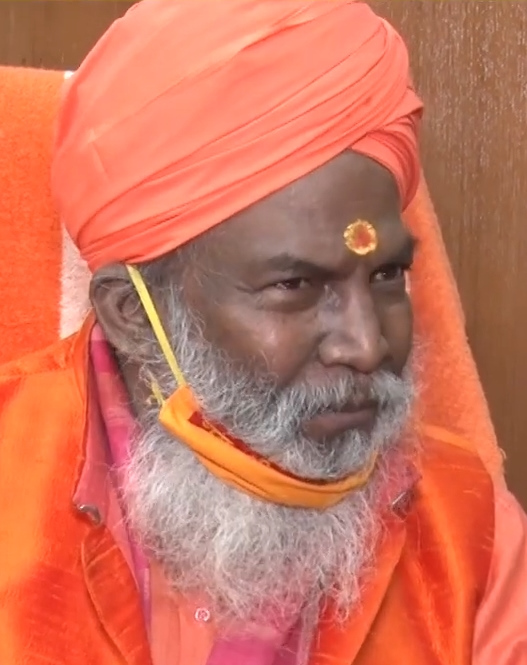
- Sakshi Maharaj in 2020

Member of Parliament, Lok Sabha
- Incumbent
- Assumed office 16 May 2014
- Preceded by: Annu Tandon
- Constituency: Unnao
- In office 1996–1999
- Preceded by: Salman Khurshid
- Succeeded by: Chandra Bhushan Singh
- Constituency: Farrukhabad
- In office 1991–1996
- Preceded by: Manvendra Singh
- Succeeded by: Chaudhary Tejveer Singh
- Constituency: Mathura

Member of Parliament, Rajya Sabha
- In office 03 April 2000 – 21 March 2006
- Constituency: Uttar Pradesh

Personal details
- Born: 12 January 1956 (age 70) Kasganj, Uttar Pradesh, India
- Party: Bharatiya Janata Party
- Education: Panjab University, Chandigarh; Maharshi Dayanand University, Rohtak
- Occupation: Politician, monk

Religious life
- Religion: Hinduism

Religious career
- Post: Acharya "Mahamandleshwar" of Shri Nirmal Panchayati Akhada.

Swami Sachchidanand Hari Sakshi Ji Maharaj (born 12 January 1956), also known as Sakshi Maharaj, is an Indian political and religious leader belonging to the Bharatiya Janata Party. He won the 2014 general election from Unnao, Uttar Pradesh. He also won Indian general election in 1991 from Mathura, 1996 and 1998 from Farrukhabad. He was also a member of Rajya Sabha from 2000 to 2006, before being suspended for corruption. He holds a Ph.D. degree and runs various educational institutions and ashrams across India under the banner of Sakshi Maharaj Group for which he is also serving as its present director.

He has been at the center of controversies for his reportedly Islamophobic views. While campaigning in the 2019 Lok Sabha Elections, he said that he feels it is the last election of the country.

== Life and career ==
Sachchidanand Hari Sakshi was born in Sakshi Dham, Kasganj district, Uttar Pradesh. His father was Atmanandji Maharaj Premi and mother was Madalasa Devi Lodhi. Sakshi belongs to the Lodhi community which has been categorised as an Other Backward Class in Uttar Pradesh. Initially, Sakshi belonged to the BJP and had close associations with kalyan singh lodhi, another BJP leader belonging to the Lodhi community, and another BJP leader Kalraj Mishra. He was elected to the Lok Sabha in 1991 from Mathura, 1996, and 1998 from Farrukhabad which has a Lodhi majority. Sakshi Maharaj has been involved in the Ram Janmabhoomi movement and is currently under trial as one of the accused in the Babri Masjid demolition case.

In the 1999 general election, he campaigned for Samajwadi Party after he was denied a ticket for Farrukhabad by BJP. After 1999 election results were declared, Mulayam Singh formally admitted him to Samajwadi Party. Sakshi Maharaj said the BJP's policies were not favourable to poorer and backward sections of the society. The ticket had been denied to him on the order of Atal Bihari Vajpayee. Back then, Sakshi was an accused in the murder of Brahm Dutt Dwivedi, a close associate of Vajpayee. But later the charges were dropped due to lack of evidence. In 2000, he was nominated to the Rajya Sabha by Mulayam Singh Yadav.

In August 2000, a college principal from Etah filed a complaint accusing Sakshi and two of his nephews, Padam Singh and Shivram Ram, of gang-raping her. The woman and her male colleague had been allegedly assaulted by Sakshi when they were driving to Agra from Etah. They had also allegedly taken away the woman's licensed firearm and jeep. The police said that the woman had been living in Sakshi Maharaj's ashram for four years. She had expressed the desire to marry a colleague but Sakshi had objected to it. Sakshi spent about a month in the Tihar jail custody awaiting trial. In 2001, he was acquitted due to lack of evidence.

In January 2002, he criticised Samajwadi Party, accusing it of dictatorship, nepotism, casteism and capitalism. He said he would remain in Samajwadi Party but support BJP candidates.

In December 2005, STAR TV broadcast a report stating that it had carried out a sting operation and found that some parliamentarians were misusing the MPLADS funds. Sakshi Maharaj, then a Rajya Sabha member, was among the 11 named parliamentarians. Sakshi had allegedly promised fund for a fictitious NGO. On 21 March 2006, the Rajya Sabha voted to expel Sakshi for violating the code of conduct while rejecting his apology.

In 2009, an inquiry started by Etah District Magistrate Gaurav Dayal found that a college owned by Sakshi had received ₹2,500,000 from the funds. The inquiry also named Sujata Verma, the principal of the college. She was later murdered. Sakshi initially absconded but on 14 October 2009 he surrendered. He was released on a bail bond of ₹15,000.

In 2012, he returned to BJP just before the assembly polls. On the night of 15 April 2013, Sujata Verma, 47, was shot dead while returning from Sakshi's ashram in Etah. The eyewitness said that he saw Sakshi's brother pull the trigger and alleged that Sakshi was behind the murder. The police booked Sakshi and associates for murder and criminal conspiracy. The victim Sujata Verma was a local panchayat member and a close associate of Sakshi. She also served as the principal of Maharani Avanti Bai College which was owned by Sakshi. But, they had been involved in a property dispute and Verma had taken the matter to court. The victim's son said that they received threats from him in the past. After the charges were filed, Sakshi went underground. On 29 April 2013, Allahabad High Court refused to quash the FIR against him. In the 2014 general election, he contested from Unnao for BJP.

== Religious and other activities ==
Sakshi Maharaj holds the title of Acharya Mahamandleshwar of Shri Nirmal Panchayati Akhada. He is also the director of Sakshi Maharaj Group which has 17 educational institutions in India and several ashrams.

== Personal views ==
On 14 September 2015 in a speech in Kannauj, Sakshi Maharaj said the madrasas were creating terrorists and they encourage their students to carry out Love Jihad.

On 11 December 2014, he called Nathuram Godse, the assassin of Mohandas Gandhi, a "patriot and nationalist" like Gandhi in the Indian Parliament. The members of the Indian National Congress party criticised the statement. Later, he retracted his statement and said that he did not consider Godse a "patriot".

On 6 January 2015 while addressing a gathering in Meerut, Sakshi urged Hindu women to produce at least four children each to protect Hinduism in India and said Muslims practice polygyny and thus have a high birth rate. In the same speech, he defended the Ghar Wapsi movement and advocated death sentence for cow slaughter and religious conversion. Police filed the FIR under Section 298 of IPC (hurting religious sentiments), among others.

Following the 2015 Nepal earthquake, on 27 April, Sakshi claimed that the earthquake happened because INC leader Rahul Gandhi visited the Kedarnath temple. He claimed that Gandhi eats beef and visited the temple without purifying himself.

In May 2016, Sakshi was at BJP worker Maidan Singh's house in Unnao after a police raid, where some of the family members including the girl were allegedly injured after they used force. The girl was made to unbutton her jeans in public view and in front of cameras to "show the MP the injuries". However, according to some reports, the main controversy on Sakshi Maharaj was that he threatened to shoot the police who entered Singh's house. Station House Officer Jitendra Kumar filed a complaint against Sakshi, after which he was booked under sections 153 (causing provocation to cause riot), 506 (for criminal intimidation) and 505 (1) (b) (intent to cause fear or alarm to the public). The police had conducted a raid on Maidan Singh's house in connection with illicit liquor trade.

== Bibliography ==
- Siddhant Updesh-I, II, III. 1980.
- Saral Vivek. 1980.
- Geeta Darshan. 1988.
- Vichar Mala. 1990.
- Paramarth Bhajanavali. 1991.

He has also been publishing the Hindi monthly Bhagwan Sandesh since 1972.
