= Chakleshwar Singh =

Indian politician (born 1922)

Member of Parliament, Lok Sabha
- In office 1971-1977
- Preceded by: Chaudhary Digambar Singh
- Succeeded by: Mani Ram Bagri
- Constituency: Mathura, Uttar Pradesh

Personal details
- Born: 8 July 1922 Dhangaon,Mathura district, United Provinces, British India (present-day Uttar Pradesh, India)
- Party: Indian National Congress

Chakleshwar Singh (born 8 July 1922) was an Indian politician. He was elected to the Lok Sabha, the lower house of the Parliament of India from the Mathura constituency of Uttar Pradesh as a member of the Indian National Congress.
