= Chhunnan Guru =

Indian politician

Member of the Uttar Pradesh Legislative Assembly
- In office 1952–1968
- Constituency: Allahabad City South

Personal details
- Born: Kalyan Chand Mohile Allahabad, United Provinces, British India
- Died: 14 October 1968 Allahabad, Uttar Pradesh, India
- Party: Praja Socialist Party; Samyukta Socialist Party
- Occupation: Politician
- Known for: Four consecutive assembly election victories

Kalyan Chand Mohile, popularly known as Chhunnan Guru, was an Indian freedom fighter and politician from Allahabad (now Prayagraj), Uttar Pradesh. A member of the Praja Socialist Party, he represented the Allahabad City South constituency in the Uttar Pradesh Legislative Assembly for four consecutive terms, winning the elections held in 1952, 1957, 1962 and 1967.

He was a supporter of socialist leader Ram Manohar Lohia. Guru was known for his strong political influence in Allahabad. He repeatedly defeated Congress candidates, including in the 1957 election, despite Indira Gandhi campaigning for the party's candidate. He died on 14 October 1968, following a brain haemorrhage, at the age of 67.
