= Daya Ram Shakya =

Indian politician (1923–2003)

Member of Parliament, Lok Sabha
- In office 1977–1984
- Preceded by: Awadhesh Chandra Singh Rathore
- Succeeded by: Khurshed Alam Khan
- Constituency: Farrukhabad, Uttar Pradesh

Personal details
- Born: 19 September 1923
- Died: 4 December 2003 (aged 80)
- Party: Indian National Congress
- Spouse: Soni Bai Shakyo

Daya Ram Shakya (19 September 1923 – 4 December 2003) was an Indian politician. He was elected to the Lok Sabha, the lower house of the Parliament of India from the Farrukhabad constituency of Uttar Pradesh as a member of the Janata Party. Shakya died on 4 December 2003, at the age of 80.
