= Amritpur Assembly constituency =

Constituency of the Uttar Pradesh legislative assembly in India

Coordinates: 27.54°N 79.60°E

Amritpur
- Constituency No. 193 for the Uttar Pradesh Legislative Assembly

Constituency details
- Country: India
- Region: North India
- State: Uttar Pradesh
- District: Farrukhabad
- Total electors: 3,14,663
- Reservation: None

Member of Legislative Assembly
- 18th Uttar Pradesh Legislative Assembly
- Incumbent Sushil Kumar Shakya
- Party: Bharatiya Janta Party
- Elected year: 2022

Amritpur Assembly constituency is a constituency of the Uttar Pradesh Legislative Assembly covering the city of Amritpur in the Farrukhabad district of Uttar Pradesh, India.

Amritpur is one of five assembly constituencies in the Farrukhabad Lok Sabha constituency. Since 2008, this assembly constituency is numbered 193 amongst 403 constituencies.

== Members of the Legislative Assembly ==
Election	Winner	Party
2012	Narendra Singh Yadav	Samajwadi Party
2017	Sushil Kumar Shakya	Bharatiya Janata Party
2022	Sushil Kumar Shakya	Bharatiya Janata Party

== Election results ==
=== 2027 ===
2027 Uttar Pradesh Legislative Assembly election: Amritpur
Party	Candidate	Votes	%	±%
INDIA				
NDA				
BSP				
NOTA	None of the above			
Majority				
Turnout				
gain from		Swing		

=== 2022 ===
2022 Uttar Pradesh Legislative Assembly election: Amritpur
Party	Candidate	Votes	%	±%
BJP	Sushil Kumar Shakya	98,848	53.1	−0.44
SP	Dr. Jitendra Singh Yadav	54,162	29.1	−1.25
BSP	Amit Kumar Singh	13,049	7.01	−2.44
Independent	Narendra Singh Yadav	12,449	6.69	
Independent	Suresh Kumar	2,120	1.14	
NOTA	None of the above	941	0.51	−0.21
Majority		44,686	24.0	+0.81
Turnout		186,149	59.16	+0.69
BJP hold		Swing		

=== 2017 ===
2017 Uttar Pradesh Legislative Assembly election: Amritpur
Party	Candidate	Votes	%	±%
BJP	Sushil Kumar Shakya	93,502	53.54	
SP	Narendra Singh Yadav	52,995	30.35	
BSP	Arun Kumar Mishra	16,500	9.45	
Independent	Shishu Pratap Singh	3,252	1.86	
Jan Adhikar Manch	Sanjay Sombanshi	2,091	1.2	
NOTA	None of the above	1,250	0.72	
Majority		40,507	23.19	
Turnout		174,640	58.47	
BJP hold		Swing		
