= Salman Khurshid =

Indian politician

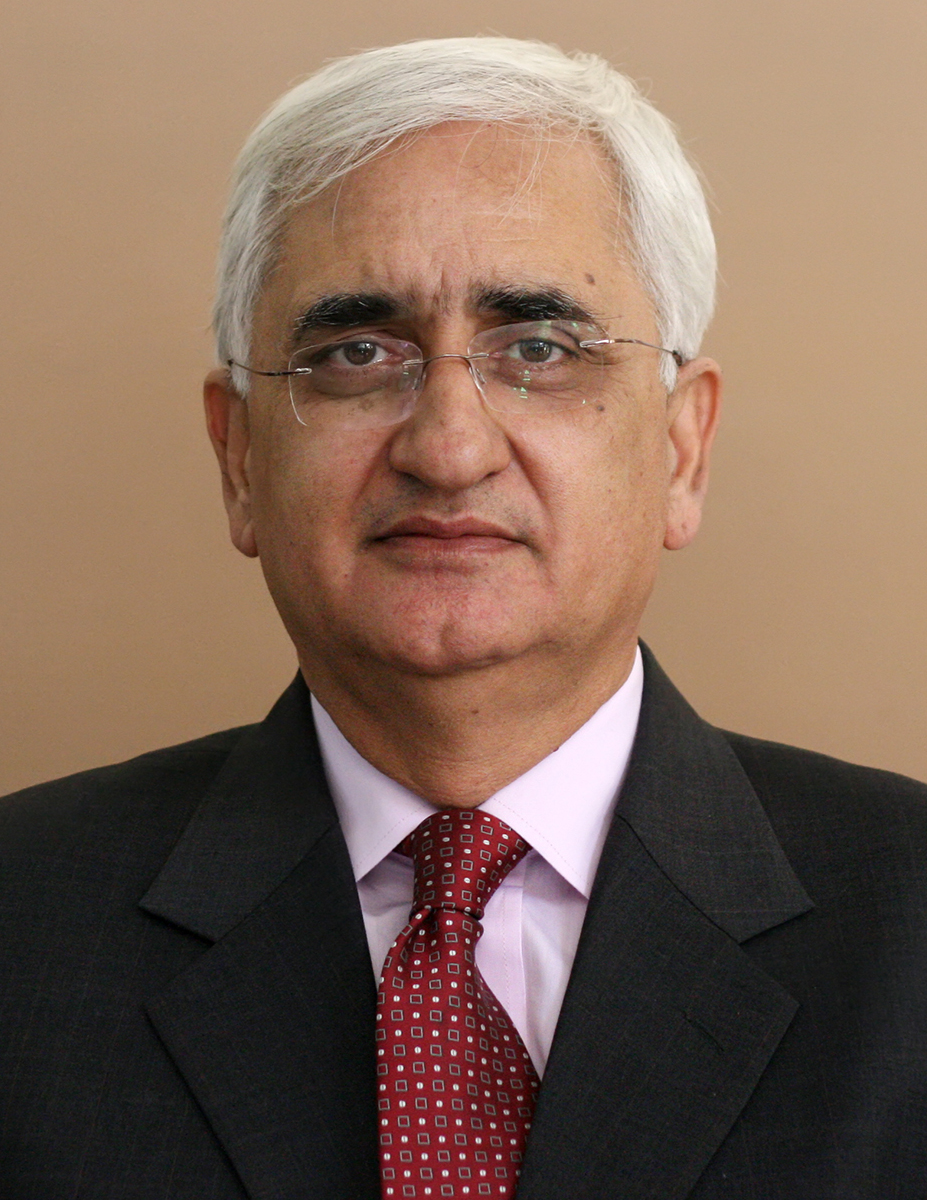
- Khurshid in 2011

Minister of External Affairs
- In office 28 October 2012 – 25 May 2014
- Prime Minister: Manmohan Singh
- Deputy: Preneet Kaur; E. Ahamed
- Preceded by: S. M. Krishna
- Succeeded by: Sushma Swaraj

Minister of Law and Justice
- In office 12 July 2011 – 28 October 2012
- Prime Minister: Manmohan Singh
- Preceded by: Veerappa Moily
- Succeeded by: Ashwani Kumar

Minister of Minority Affairs
- In office 28 May 2009 – 28 October 2012
- Prime Minister: Manmohan Singh
- Deputy: Vincent Pala
- Preceded by: A. R. Antulay
- Succeeded by: K. Rahman Khan

Minister of Water Resources
- In office 19 January 2011 – 12 July 2011
- Prime Minister: Manmohan Singh
- Preceded by: Pawan Kumar Bansal
- Succeeded by: Pawan Kumar Bansal

Member of Parliament, Lok Sabha
- In office 16 May 2009 – 16 May 2014
- Preceded by: Chandra Bhushan Singh
- Succeeded by: Mukesh Rajput
- Constituency: Farrukhabad
- In office 20 June 1991 – 10 May 1996
- Preceded by: Santosh Bhartiya
- Succeeded by: Sakshi Maharaj
- Constituency: Farrukhabad

President of Uttar Pradesh Congress Committee
- In office 7 November 2004 – 12 September 2007
- Preceded by: Jagdambika Pal
- Succeeded by: Rita Bahuguna Joshi
- In office 1999 – 4 December 2000
- Succeeded by: Sriprakash Jaiswal

General Secretary of AICC
- In office 2004–2005
- President: Sonia Gandhi

Personal details
- Born: 1 January 1953 (age 73) Aligarh, Uttar Pradesh, India
- Party: Indian National Congress
- Spouse: Louise Khurshid
- Parent: Khurshed Alam Khan (father)
- Relatives: Zakir Husain (grandfather); Shah Jahan Begum (grandmother), Rehana Mishra, Neelofer Menon & Anjum Majid Shirazi (siblings)
- Education: Delhi University (B.A.); Oxford University (M.A., BCL)
- Profession: Senior Advocate

Salman Khurshid Alam Khan (born 1 January 1953) is an Indian lawyer and politician who served as the Union Minister of External Affairs under Manmohan Singh. He is a member of the Indian National Congress who was elected from Farrukhabad Lok Sabha constituency in the General Election of 2009 from the Farrukhabad area. Earlier he was elected to the 10th Lok Sabha (1991–1996) from the Farrukhabad Lok Sabha constituency. He became the Union Deputy Minister of Commerce in June 1991, and later became the Union Minister of State for External Affairs (January 1993 – June 1996). He started his political career in 1981 as an Officer on Special Duty in the Prime Minister's Office (PMO) under the prime ministership of Indira Gandhi. He was named one of the Most Influential Indian Muslims of 2024 by Muslim Mirror.

== Early life and education ==
He is the son of Khurshed Alam Khan, a former Union Minister of External affairs, Government of India, and maternal grandson of Zakir Husain, the third President of India. He is of Pathan ancestry on both his paternal and maternal sides of his family, he traces his lineage to the Afridi and Kheshgi Tribes of Afghanistan.

He studied in St. Xavier's High School, Patna, Delhi Public School, Mathura Road. He obtained B.A. (English and Jurisprudence) from St. Stephen's College, Delhi and later did M.A., Bachelor of Civil Law at St Edmund Hall, Oxford. He also taught as lecturer in law at Trinity College, Oxford.

== Political career ==
Salman started his political career as an Officer on Special Duty in the Prime Minister's Office, during the Prime Ministership of Indira Gandhi in the early 1980s. Later he became the Deputy Minister of Commerce in the Government of India. In 1991, he won the election to parliament from the Farrukhabad Lok Sabha constituency in Uttar Pradesh and was appointed Minister of State for External Affairs by Prime Minister Narasimha Rao. He lost the election of 1996 and it was not until 2009 that he returned to Parliament.

In the General Election of 2009, he was elected as Member of Parliament from Farrukhabad, winning as a candidate of the Indian National Congress, with 169,351 votes. He became the Union Minister of State (with Independent Charges) of Corporate Affairs and Minority Affairs in the Government of India. He took over as Minister on Friday, 29 May 2009. In the Cabinet reshuffle of 12 July 2011, he was made Cabinet Minister for Law and Justice, and for Minority Affairs, in the Government of India.

He came 4th and lost his deposit in the Lok Sabha elections 2014 contesting from the same constituency of Farrukhabad. In the next parliamentary election (2019), he stood 3rd in with 55,258 votes.

== Political offices ==
He has been the President of the Uttar Pradesh Congress Committee twice. He was also the President of the Delhi Public School Society and Dr. Zakir Hussain Study Circle and PATRON of Mother Teresa Memorial Trust/Mother Teresa Foundation.

In 2009, incumbent president Sirajuddin Qureshi beat Salman Khurshid for the presidency of India Islamic Cultural Centre (IICC). In 2024, he was elected president of IICC.

== Political views ==
Salman Khurshid appeared for Students Islamic Movement of India, a group banned in India and frequently charged by Indian authorities with terrorist activities, as its defence lawyer, appealing the 2002 ban; in June 2006 the Supreme Court of India rejected the appeal noting "the appeal against the ban should be first argued before the tribunal established for the purposes". Asked about his appearance, Khurshid said:

I would refuse a client only when I am personally satisfied that taking up the case would go against the ethics of the profession. A lawyer has to appear for an accused. It is my constitutional duty. A party and the government too cannot pre-judge an organisation.

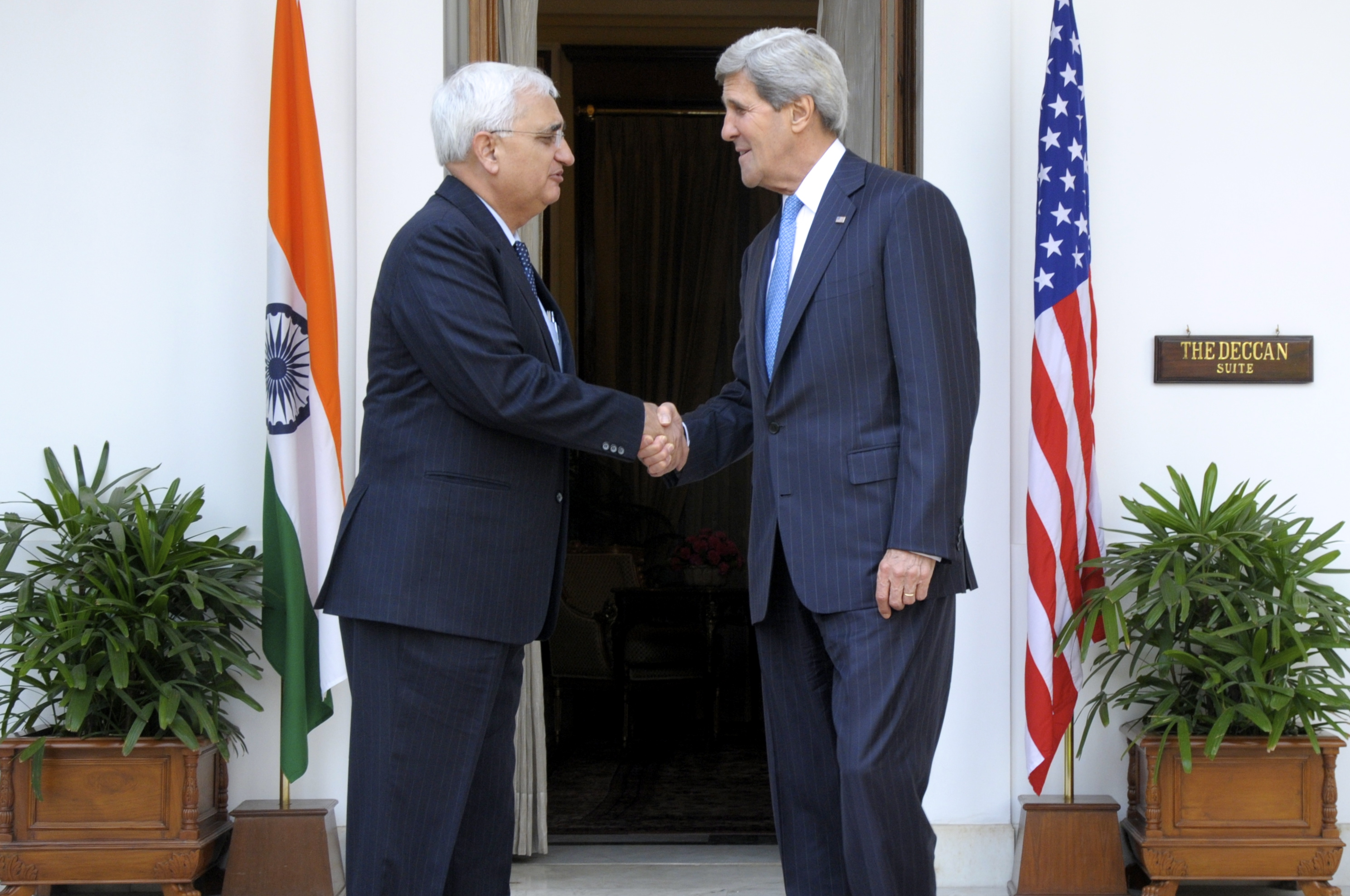
Khursid with John Kerry, Secretary of State, United States in 2013, during his term as the External affairs minister

In 2009, Salman Khurshid criticized the partition of India, opining that a united India would have been better than a divided one.

== Writings ==
He is the author of the play Sons of Babur, published by Rupa & Co., which has been staged, with Tom Alter in the lead role, at the Red Fort in Delhi.

Khurshid was the editor of "The Contemporary Conservative: Selected Writings of Dhiren Bhagat" published in 1990.

In October 2021, Khurshid published Sunrise over Ayodhya: Nationhood in Our Times, writing about India's decline in secularism surrounding the Ayodhya dispute. BJP leaders shared an excerpt from the book and triggered a controversy regarding Khurshid's attempt to draw a parallel between Hindutva and radical Islamist groups. The controversy resulted in his Nainital home being vandalized and set on fire.

A suit filed by Hindu Sena President Vishu Gupta, wanting to stop the publication, circulation, and sale of the book Sunrise over Ayodhya was dismissed by a Delhi court on 18 November 2021. The court said that the author and publisher had the right to write and publish the book.

== Lok Sabha Election Contested ==
Year	Constituency	Party	Votes	%	Opponent	Party	Votes	%	Result	Margin	%
1989	Farrukhabad	INC	157,968	30.89	Santosh Bhartiya	JD	165,452	32.36	Lost	-7,484	-1.47
1991	Farrukhabad	INC	142,842	29.54	Anwar Md. Khan	JP	104,692	21.65	Won	+38,150	+7.89
1996	Farrukhabad	INC	97,261	16.75	Sakshi Maharaj	BJP	229,906	39.60	Lost	-132,645	-22.85
1998	Farrukhabad	INC	180,531	25.51	Sakshi Maharaj	BJP	224,636	31.75	Lost	-44,105	-6.24
2009	Farrukhabad	INC	169,351	27.72	Naresh Ch. Agrawal	BSP	142,152	23.26	Won	+27,199	+4.46
2014	Farrukhabad	INC	95,543	9.84	Mukesh Rajput	BJP	406,195	41.85	Lost	-310,652	-32.01
2019	Farrukhabad	INC	55,258	5.51	Mukesh Rajput	BJP	569,880	56.82	Lost	-514,622	-51.31

== Zakir Hussain Memorial Trust and Operation Dhritrashtra ==
Khurshid and his wife Louise run the Zakir Hussain Memorial Trust for physically challenged people. The trust was founded on 30 October 1986 and commemorates the third President of India, Zakir Husain, who is the maternal grandfather of Salman Khurshid. The Zakir Hussain Memorial Trust is registered at Khurshid's residence as an NGO and Louise is its chief functionary officer. It has been operating in many states and receiving substantial grants from several important ministries of the government of India. As of 2012, it is chaired by Sayeeda Alam, Khurshid's father. In October 2012, India Today and Aaj Tak alleged that the Khurshids had embezzled funds, a charge denied by them. The ruling party Congress strongly defended Khurshid, but former social activist Arvind Kejriwal of Aam Aadmi Party began what he called "indefinite agitation". Angered by the allegations, Khurshid called Arvind Kejriwal a 'guttersnipe'. About 7.1 million was allegedly used by Salman Khurshid which was funded by the government to buy tricycles for the disabled.

"Operation Dhritrashtra" was an investigation conducted by TV news channel Aaj Tak which alleged financial misappropriation by the trust. The investigation conducted by Deepak Sharma, Editor, SIT, India Today Group, revealed that it forged signatures and stamps of senior officials of several districts in Uttar Pradesh. Aaj Tak gathered documentary evidence of the alleged forgery and false reporting from at least ten districts in the state. The Uttar Pradesh Economic offence wing investigated the matter. Louise filed a defamation case against the TV Today news broadcaster, which had publicised the allegations.

== See also ==
- List of international trips made by Salman Khurshid as Minister of External Affairs of India

Lok Sabha
Preceded by Santosh Bhartiya	Member of Parliament for Farrukhabad; 1991 – 1996	Succeeded by Sakshi Maharaj
Preceded by Chandra Bhushan Singh	Member of Parliament for Farrukhabad; 2009 – 2014	Succeeded by Mukesh Rajput
Political offices
Preceded by A. R. Antulay	Union Minister of Minority Affairs; 19 January 2009 – 28 October 2012	Succeeded by K. Rahman Khan
Preceded by Veerappa Moily	Union Minister of Law and Justice; 28 May 2011 – 28 October 2012	Succeeded by Ashwani Kumar
Preceded by S. M. Krishna	Union Minister of External Affairs; 28 October 2012 – 26 May 2014	Succeeded by Sushma Swaraj
