= Satyapal Singh Rathore =

Indian politician

Member of the Uttar Pradesh legislative assembly
- Incumbent
- Assumed office 25 March 2022
- Preceded by: Rameshwar Singh Yadav
- Constituency: Aliganj

Personal details
- Party: BJP
- Occupation: Politician

Satyapal Singh Rathore is an Indian politician currently serving as a member of the 18th Uttar Pradesh Assembly, representing the Aliganj Assembly constituency. He is a member of the Bharatiya Janata Party.

== Political career ==
Following the 2022 Uttar Pradesh Assembly elections, he won the seat by defeating Rameshwar Singh Yadav of the Samajwadi Party with a margin of 2800 votes which is very close .
