= Sushil Kumar Shakya =

Indian politician

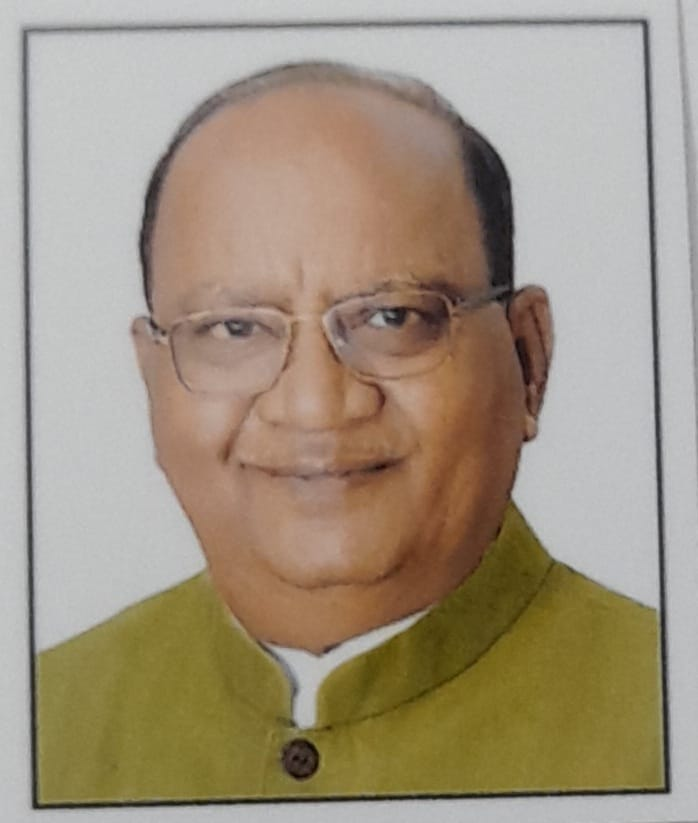

Member of the Uttar Pradesh Legislative Assembly
- Incumbent
- Assumed office 2017
- Preceded by: Narendra Singh Yadav
- Constituency: Amritpur
- In office 1996–2002
- Preceded by: Pratap Singh Yadav
- Succeeded by: Louise Khursheed
- Constituency: Kaimganj

Personal details
- Born: 9 September 1950 (age 75) Nagpur, Nagpur district, Madhya Pradesh
- Party: Bharatiya Janata Party
- Spouse: Usha Shakya (m. 1977)
- Children: 2 sons
- Parent: Dayaram Shakya (father)

Sushil Kumar Shakya is an Indian politician and a member of 17th Uttar Pradesh Assembly, Uttar Pradesh of India. He represents the Amritpur constituency in the Farrukhabad district of Uttar Pradesh.

== Political career ==
Sushil Kumar Shakya contested Uttar Pradesh Assembly Election as a Bharatiya Janata Party candidate and defeated his close contestant Narendra Singh Yadav from the Samajwadi Party with a margin of 40,507 votes.

== Posts held ==
#	From	To	Position	Comments
01	1996	2001	13th legislative assembly	
02	2017	Incumbent	Member, 17th Legislative Assembly	
