= Aliganj Assembly constituency =

Constituency of the Uttar Pradesh legislative assembly in India

Aliganj
- Constituency No. 103 for the Uttar Pradesh Legislative Assembly

Constituency details
- Country: India
- Region: North India
- State: Uttar Pradesh
- District: Etah
- Total electors: 299,641 (2012)
- Reservation: None

Member of Legislative Assembly
- 18th Uttar Pradesh Legislative Assembly
- Incumbent Satyapal Singh Rathore
- Party: Bharatiya Janata Party
- Elected year: 2022

Aliganj Assembly constituency is one of the 403 constituencies of the Uttar Pradesh Legislative Assembly, India. It is a part of the Etah district and one of the five assembly constituencies in the Farrukhabad Lok Sabha constituency. First election in this assembly constituency was held in 1957 after the "DPACO (1956)" (delimitation order) was passed in 1956. After the "Delimitation of Parliamentary and Assembly Constituencies Order" was passed in 2008, the constituency was assigned identification number 103.

== Wards / Areas ==
Extent of Aliganj Assembly constituency is Aliganj Tehsil.

== Members of the Legislative Assembly ==
Year	Winner	Party
1957	Bhup Kishore	Independent
1962	Ch Lokpal Singh	Bharatiya Jana Sangh
1967	Chaudhary Latoori Singh Yadav	Indian National Congress
1969	Satish Chandra	Bharatiya Jana Sangh
1974	Chaudhary Latoori Singh Yadav	Indian National Congress
1977	Genda Lal Gupta	Janata Party
1980	Chaudhary Latoori Singh Yadav	Janata Party (Secular)
1985	Udayvir Singh Rathore	Indian National Congress
1989	Chaudhary Latoori Singh Yadav	Indian National Congress
1991	Ch.Awadhpal Singh Yadav	Janata Party (Secular)
1993	Ch.Awadhpal Singh Yadav	Samajwadi Party
1996	Rameshwar Singh Yadav	Samajwadi Party
2002	Rameshwar Singh Yadav	Samajwadi Party
2007	Ch.Awadhpal Singh Yadav	Bahujan Samaj Party
2012	Rameshwar Singh Yadav	Samajwadi Party
2017	Satyapal Singh Rathore	Bharatiya Janata Party
2022	Satyapal Singh Rathore	Bharatiya Janata Party

== Election results ==
=== 2027 ===
2027 Uttar Pradesh Legislative Assembly election: Aliganj
Party	Candidate	Votes	%	±%
INDIA				
NDA				
BSP				
NOTA	None of the above			
Majority				
Turnout				
gain from		Swing		

=== 2022 ===
2022 Uttar Pradesh Legislative Assembly election: Aliganj
Party	Candidate	Votes	%	±%
BJP	Satyapal Singh Rathore	102,873	45.44	▲4.49
SP	Rameshwar Singh Yadav	99,063	43.76	▲9.21
BSP	Saud Ali Khan	17,751	7.84	▼13.52
NOTA	None of the above	1,263	0.56	▼0.17
Majority		3,810	1.68	▼4.72
Turnout		226,375	66.15	▲1.29
BJP hold		Swing		

=== 2017 ===
2017 Uttar Pradesh Legislative Assembly election: Aliganj
Party	Candidate	Votes	%	±%
BJP	Satyapal Singh Rathore	88,695	40.95	
SP	Rameshwar Singh Yadav	74,844	34.55	
BSP	Awadhpal Singh Yadav	46,275	21.36	
NOTA	None of the above	1,572	0.73	
Majority		13,851	6.4	
Turnout		216,594	64.86	
BJP gain from SP		Swing		

=== 2012 ===
16th Vidhan Sabha: 2012 General Elections

2012 General Elections: Aliganj
Party	Candidate	Votes	%	±%
SP	Rameshwar Singh Yadav	91,141	45.63	−
BSP	Sanghmitra Maurya	65,120	32.6	−
Independent	Neeraj Kishor	24,535	12.28	−
	Remainder 13 candidates	18,952	9.48	−
Majority		26,021	13.03	−
Turnout		199,748	66.66	−
SP gain from BSP		Swing		

== See also ==
- Etah district
- Farrukhabad Lok Sabha constituency
- Sixteenth Legislative Assembly of Uttar Pradesh
- Uttar Pradesh Legislative Assembly
- Vidhan Bhawan
