= Goverdhan Assembly constituency =

Constituency of the Uttar Pradesh legislative assembly in India

Goverdhan
- Constituency No. 83 for the Uttar Pradesh Legislative Assembly

Constituency details
- Country: India
- Region: North India
- State: Uttar Pradesh
- District: Mathura
- Established: 1956
- Total electors: 3,19,815 (2019)
- Reservation: None

Member of Legislative Assembly
- 18th Uttar Pradesh Legislative Assembly
- Incumbent Meghshyam Singh
- Party: Bharatiya Janata Party

Goverdhan Assembly constituency is one of the 403 constituencies of the Uttar Pradesh Legislative Assembly, India. It is a part of the Mathura district and one of the five assembly constituencies in the Mathura Lok Sabha constituency. First election in this assembly constituency was held in 1957 after the "DPACO (1956)" (delimitation order) was passed in 1956. After the "Delimitation of Parliamentary and Assembly Constituencies Order" was passed in 2008, the constituency was assigned identification number 83.

== Wards / Areas ==
Extent of Goverdhan Assembly constituency is KC Goverdhan, PCs Konai, Basauti, Barhauta, Ral, Jikhangaon, Tosh, Jachonda, Maura, Bati, Chhatikara(ShashthiVan), Jaint, Maghera, Atas Bangar, Sunrakh Bangar, Dhaurera Bangar, Kota of Vrindaban KC, KC Kosi Khurd, PCs Sonsa, Madhurikund, Satoha Asgarpur, Junsuti, Uncha Gaon, Shahpur Chainpur, Umari, Tarsi, Usphar of Mathura KC, PCs Koyala Alipur, Karnawal, Bad, Bhainsa, Chhargaon, Sersa, Bhudrasu, Pura, Bhahai, Beri of Bad KC, Goverdhan NP, Radhakund NP & Sonkh NP of Mathura Tehsil.

== Members of the Legislative Assembly ==
Year	Member	Party
1957	Jugal Kishore	Indian National Congress
1962	Jugal Kishore	Indian National Congress
1967	Khem	Independent
1969	Kanhaiya Lal	Indian National Congress
1974	Gyanendra Swaroop	Bharatiya Kranti Dal
1977	Gyanendra Swaroop	Janata Party
1980	Kanhaiya Lal	Janata Party (Secular)
1985	Baljeet	Indian National Congress
1989	Gyanendra Swaroop	Janata Dal
1991	Pooran Prakash	Janata Dal
1993	Ajay Kumar Poeia	Bharatiya Janata Party
1996	Ajay Kumar Poeia	Bharatiya Janata Party
2002	Shyam Singh Aheria	Bharatiya Janata Party
2007	Pooran Prakash	Rashtriya Lok Dal
2012	Rajkumar Rawat	Bahujan Samaj Party
2017	Karinda Singh	Bharatiya Janata Party
2022	Meghshyam Singh	Bharatiya Janata Party

== Election results ==
=== 2027 ===
2027 Uttar Pradesh Legislative Assembly election: Goverdhan
Party	Candidate	Votes	%	±%
INDIA				
NDA				
BSP	Rajkumar Rawat			
NOTA	None of the above			
Majority				
Turnout				
gain from		Swing		

=== 2022 ===
2022 Uttar Pradesh Legislative Assembly election: Goverdhan
Party	Candidate	Votes	%	±%
BJP	Meghshyam Singh	100,199	45.21	▲0.04
BSP	Rajkumar Rawat	57,692	26.03	▼3.2
RLD	Preetam Singh	55,679	25.12	▲5.32
INC	Deepak Chaudhary	3,118	1.41	▼1.46
NOTA	None of the above	873	0.39	▼0.29
Majority		42,507	19.18	▲3.24
Turnout		221,637	66.31	▼0.19
BJP hold		Swing		

=== 2017 ===
2017 Uttar Pradesh Legislative Assembly election: Goverdhan
Party	Candidate	Votes	%	±%
BJP	Karinda Singh	93,538	45.17	
BSP	Rajkumar Rawat	60,529	29.23	
RLD	Narendra Singh	40,999	19.8	
INC	Ranvir Pandav	5,943	2.87	
NOTA	None of the above	1,398	0.68	
Majority		33,009	15.94	
Turnout		207,072	66.5	
BJP gain from BSP		Swing		

=== 2012 ===
2012 Uttar Pradesh Legislative Assembly election: Goverdhan
Party	Candidate	Votes	%	±%
BSP	Rajkumar Rawat	63,725	34.76	−
RLD	Meghshyam Singh	42,230	23.04	−
BJP	Karinda Singh	34,073	18.59	−
	Remainder 13 candidates	43,301	23.6	−
Majority		21,495	11.72	−
Turnout		1,83,329	67.23	−
BSP gain from RLD		Swing		

== See also ==
- Mathura district
- Mathura Lok Sabha constituency
- Sixteenth Legislative Assembly of Uttar Pradesh
- Uttar Pradesh Legislative Assembly
