= Surabhi Singh =

Indian politician

Dr. Surabhi Singh

Member of the Uttar Pradesh Legislative Assembly
- Incumbent
- Assumed office 2022
- Preceded by: Amar Singh Khatik
- Constituency: Kaimganj

Personal details
- Born: 1985 (age 40–41)
- Party: Apna Dal (Sonelal)
- Other political affiliations: National Democratic Alliance
- Education: Dr. Bhimrao Ambedkar University; Indian Institute of Management Calcutta
- Occupation: Dentist

Surabhi Singh (born 1985) is an Indian politician from Uttar Pradesh. She is an MLA from Kaimganj Assembly constituency which is reserved for Scheduled Castes in Farrukhabad district. She represents Apna Dal (Soneylal) Party, which is an ally of the Bharatiya Janata Party. She won the 2022 Uttar Pradesh Legislative Assembly election.

== Early life and education ==
Singh is from Kaimganj. She completed her bachelor's degree in dentistry at Dr. B.R. Ambedkar University in 2010 and later earned her postgraduate diploma in hospital management in 2020 at Indian Institute of Management Calcutta. She married Ajit Singh, who is also a doctor.

== Career ==
Singh won the 2022 Uttar Pradesh Legislative Assembly election from the Kaimganj reserved constituency representing Apna Dal (Sonelal) Party. She polled 1,14,952 votes and defeated Sarvesh Ambedkar of Samajwadi Party (SP) by a margin of 18,543 votes. Earlier, she lost the 2017 Uttar Pradesh Legislative Assembly election on Samajwadi Party ticket from the same constituency.
