= 18th June Road =

Street in Panaji, Goa, India

Coordinates: 15.496459°N 73.823586°E

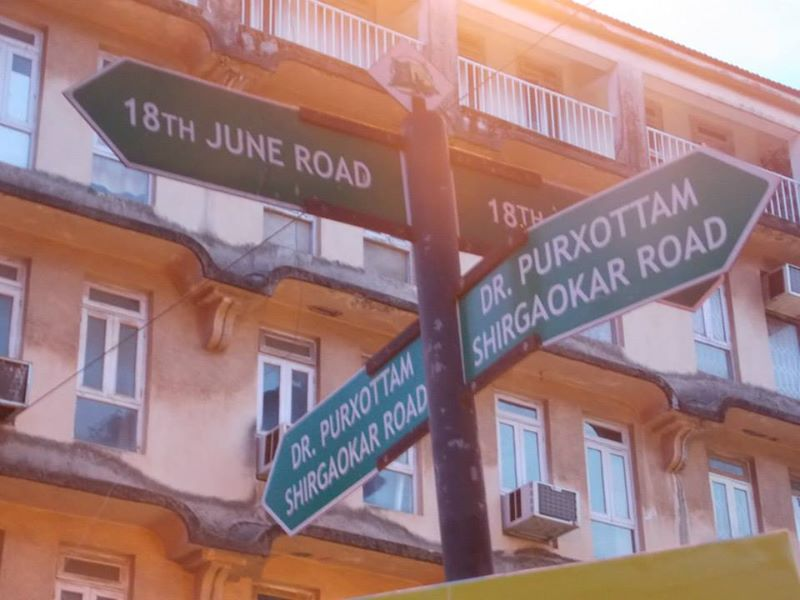

18th June Road is one of the busiest streets in Panaji, Goa, India. It is located in the heart of the city, and is a major shopping destination for the tourist folks. Major businesses and restaurants line the street. The street is named after the day in 1946 on which Ram Manohar Lohia had called a meeting to put an end to the Portuguese rule in India.

== History ==
The street is named after the day in 1946 on which Ram Manohar Lohia had called a meeting to put an end to the Portuguese rule in India.
