= Chaudhary Tejveer Singh =

Indian politician

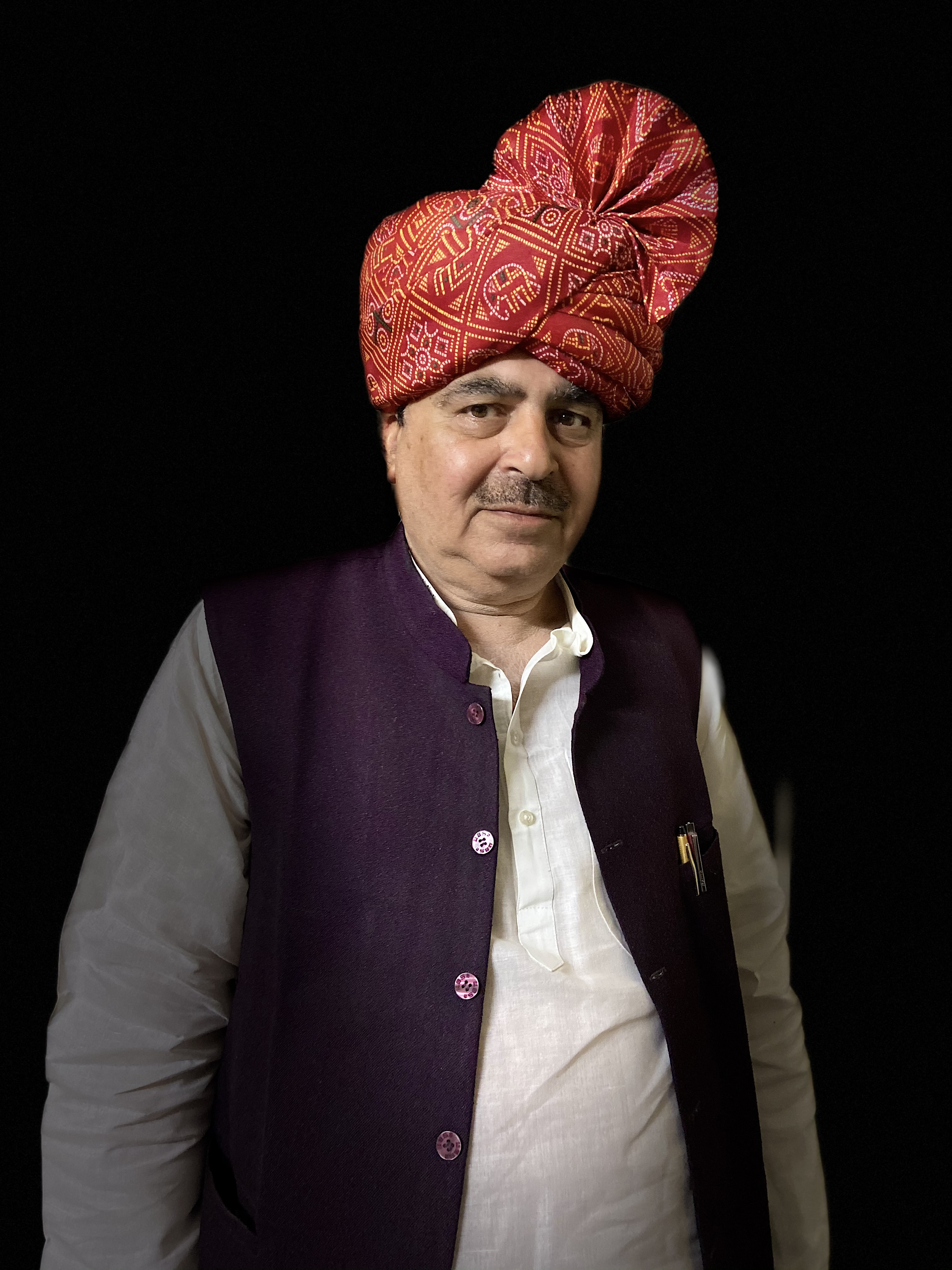

Member of Parliament, Rajya Sabha
- Incumbent
- Assumed office 2024
- Preceded by: Ashok Bajpai
- Constituency: Uttar Pradesh

Member of Parliament, Lok Sabha
- In office 15 May 1996 – 6 April 2004
- Preceded by: Sakshi Maharaj
- Succeeded by: Manvendra Singh
- Constituency: Mathura

Personal details
- Born: 2 December 1959 (age 66) Shahpur, Uttar Pradesh, India
- Party: Bharatiya Janata Party
- Spouse: Gyan Kumari
- Children: 4
- Occupation: Agriculturist

Chaudhary Tejveer Singh (born 2 December 1959) is a leader of Bharatiya Janata Party from Uttar Pradesh.Currently Serving as Member of Parliament Rajya Sabha. Previously He served as a member of the Lok Sabha representing Mathura (Lok Sabha constituency). He was elected to 11th, 12th and 13th Lok Sabha.

Chaudhary Tejveer Singh, former MP of Mathura has been elected unopposed as the chairman of Uttar Pradesh Cooperative Bank. With this, Samajwadi Party leader and former minister Shivpal Singh Yadav has been discharged.He was previously the Uttar Pradesh, co-operative chairman

== Political career ==
- May 1996: Elected to 11th Lok Sabha
- March 1998: Elected to 12th Lok Sabha
- October 1999: Elected to 13th Lok Sabha
- August 2018: Elected as the chairman of Uttar Pradesh Cooperative Bank
- April 2024: Member of Rajya Sabha
