= Karinda Singh =

Indian politician

Karinda Singh is an Indian politician and is member of Uttar Pradesh Legislative Assembly representing Goverdhan assembly constituency of Mathura district as BJP MLA.
