= Mukesh Rajput =

Indian politician

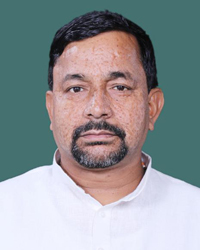

Member of Parliament, Lok Sabha
- Incumbent
- Assumed office 16 May 2014
- Preceded by: Salman Khurshid
- Constituency: Farrukhabad

Personal details
- Born: 8 August 1968 (age 57) Farrukhabad, Uttar Pradesh, India
- Party: Bharatiya Janata Party
- As of 17 December, 2016

Mukesh Lodhi Rajput is an Indian politician and a second time elected Member of the Pariliament of India in 17thLok Sabha, representing the Farrukhabad constituency. Prior to this he was elected to 16th Lok Sabha (2014–2019) from the same constituency. He belongs to Bhartiya Janata Party.

== Early life and education ==
Mukesh Lodhi Rajput was born on 8 August 1968 to a Lodhi Rajput family consisting of his father Shri Lajjaram and his mother Smt. Chandawati. He was born in Farrukhabad, a city in the state of Uttar Pradesh. He completed his Bachelor of Science (B.Sc.) degree from R.P. Degree College, Kamalganj, Farrukhabad, Uttar Pradesh. He married Saubhagyawati on 10 June 1980.
