= Mulchand Dube =

Indian politician (1884–1963)

Member of Parliament, Lok Sabha
- In office 1952-1962
- Succeeded by: Ram Manohar Lohia
- Constituency: Farrukhabad, Uttar Pradesh

Personal details
- Born: 8 December 1884
- Died: 26 January 1963 (aged 78) Lucknow, India
- Party: Indian National Congress
- Spouse: Champa Devi

Mulchand Dube (8 December 1884 – 26 January 1963) was an Indian politician. He was elected to the Lok Sabha, the lower house of the Parliament of India from the Farrukhabad constituency of Uttar Pradesh as a member of the Indian National Congress in 1952, 1957, and 1962. Dube died in Lucknow on 26 January 1963, at the age of 78.
