= Pooran Prakash =

Indian politician

MLA, 16th Legislative Assembly
- Incumbent
- Assumed office Mar 2012
- Preceded by: None
- Constituency: Baldev

MLA, 15th Legislative Assembly
- In office May 2007 – Mar 2012
- Preceded by: Shyam
- Succeeded by: Rajkumar Rawat
- Constituency: Goverdhan

MLA, 11th Legislative Assembly
- In office Jun 1991 – Dec 1992
- Preceded by: Gyanendra Swaroop
- Succeeded by: Ajay Kumar Poeia
- Constituency: Goverdhan

Personal details
- Born: 15 July 1955 (age 71) Mathura district
- Party: Rashtriya Lok Dal (2007–2016); Bharatiya Janata Party (2016–present)
- Other political affiliations: Janata Dal
- Education: Babu Shivnath Agrawal College
- Profession: Businessperson, lawyer & politician

Pooran Prakash is an Indian politician and a member of the 16th Legislative Assembly of India. He represents the Baldev constituency of Uttar Pradesh and is a member of the Bharatiya Janata Party.

== Early life and education ==
Pooran Prakash was born in Mathura district . He attended the Babu Shivnath Agrawal College and attained Bachelor of Laws degree. Prakash belongs to the scheduled caste community.

== Political career ==
Prakash has been a MLA for three terms. He represented the Baldev constituency and was a member of the Rashtriya Lok Dal political party. On 26 December 2016, Prakash left the RLD and joined the Bharatiya Janata Party.

On 9 August 2017, Prakash suffered serious blood pressure problems after donating blood, after which he was kept under observation for three hours while doctors attempted to bring his blood pressure back to normal. In his tenure many developments have taken place in Baldev constituency. He was the favorite of people of Baldev constituency.

== Posts held ==
#	From	To	Position	Comments
01	2012	Incumbent	Member, 16th Legislative Assembly	
02	2007	2012	Member, 15th Legislative Assembly	
03	1991	1992	Member, 11th Legislative Assembly	

== See also ==
- Baldev
- Goverdhan
- Sixteenth Legislative Assembly of Uttar Pradesh
- Uttar Pradesh Legislative Assembly
