= Baldev Assembly constituency =

Constituency of the Uttar Pradesh legislative assembly in India

Baldev
- Constituency No. 85 for the Uttar Pradesh Legislative Assembly

Constituency details
- Country: India
- Region: North India
- State: Uttar Pradesh
- District: Mathura
- Established: 2008
- Total electors: 3,63,867 (2019)
- Reservation: SC

Member of Legislative Assembly
- 18th Uttar Pradesh Legislative Assembly
- Incumbent Pooran Prakash
- Party: Bharatiya Janata Party
- Elected year: 2022

Baldev is one of the 403 constituencies of the Uttar Pradesh Legislative Assembly, India. It is a part of the Mathura district and one of the five assembly constituencies in the Mathura Lok Sabha constituency. First election in this assembly constituency was held in 2012 after the "Delimitation of Parliamentary and Assembly Constituencies Order, 2008" was passed and the constituency was formed in 2008. The constituency is assigned identification number 85.

== Wards / Areas ==
Extent of Baldev Assembly constituency is KC Raya & Raya NP of Mant Tehsil; KCs Farah, Baldev, Barauli, PCs Ladpur, Barari, Jhandipur, Garhaya Latifpur, Shahpur Farah, Mahuan, Makhdoom of Bad KC, Mahaban NP, Baldev NP, Gokul NP & Farah NP of Mathura Tehsil.

== Members of the Legislative Assembly ==
Year	Member	Party
Till 2012 : Constituency did not exist
2012	Pooran Prakash	Rashtriya Lok Dal
2017	Pooran Prakash	Bharatiya Janata Party
2022	Pooran Prakash	Bharatiya Janata Party

== Election results ==
=== 2027 ===
2027 Uttar Pradesh Legislative Assembly election: Baldev
Party	Candidate	Votes	%	±%
INDIA				
NDA				
BSP				
NOTA	None of the above			
Majority				
Turnout				
gain from		Swing		

=== 2022 ===
2022 Uttar Pradesh Legislative Assembly election: Baldev
Party	Candidate	Votes	%	±%
BJP	Pooran Prakash	108,414	44.14	▲5.99
RLD	Babita Devi	83,159	33.86	▲1.41
BSP	Ashok Kumar	48,370	19.69	▼3.41
INC	Vinesh Kumar Sanwal	2,248	0.92	▲0.56
NOTA	None of the above	1,232	0.5	▼0.2
Majority		25,255	10.28	▲4.58
Turnout		245,601	65.15	▼1.53
BJP hold		Swing		

=== 2017 ===
2017 Uttar Pradesh Legislative Assembly election: Baldev
Party	Candidate	Votes	%	±%
BJP	Pooran Prakash	88,411	38.15	
RLD	Niranjan Singh Dhangar	75,203	32.45	
BSP	Premchand Kardam	53,539	23.1	
SP	Ranvir Singh	8,893	3.84	
NOTA	None of the above	1,601	0.7	
Majority		13,208	5.7	
Turnout		231,770	66.68	

=== 2012 ===
2012 General Elections: Baldev
Party	Candidate	Votes	%	±%
RLD	Pooran Prakash	79,364	41.53	–
BSP	Chandrabhan Singh	47,270	24.74	–
BJP	Ajay Kumar Poeia	45,372	23.74	–
	Remainder 9 candidates	19,081	9.97	–
Majority		32,094	16.8	–
Turnout		191,087	60.26	–
RLD hold		Swing		

== See also ==
- Mathura district
- Mathura Lok Sabha constituency
- Sixteenth Legislative Assembly of Uttar Pradesh
- Uttar Pradesh Legislative Assembly
