= Kaimganj Assembly constituency =

Constituency of the Uttar Pradesh legislative assembly in India

Coordinates: 27.55°N 79.33°E

Kaimganj
- Constituency No. 192 for the Uttar Pradesh Legislative Assembly

Constituency details
- Country: India
- Region: North India
- State: Uttar Pradesh
- District: Farrukhabad
- Reservation: SC

Member of Legislative Assembly
- 18th Uttar Pradesh Legislative Assembly
- Incumbent Surabhi Singh
- Party: AD(S)
- Alliance: NDA
- Elected year: 2022

Kaimganj is a constituency of the Uttar Pradesh Legislative Assembly covering the city of Kaimganj in the Farrukhabad district of Uttar Pradesh, India.

Kaimganj is one of five assembly constituencies in the Farrukhabad Lok Sabha constituency. Since 2008, this assembly constituency is numbered 192 amongst 403 constituencies.

== Members of the Legislative Assembly ==
Election	Name	Party
2007	Kuldip Singh Gangwar	Bahujan Samaj Party
2012	Ajit Kumar	Samajwadi Party
2017	Amar Singh Khatik	Bharatiya Janata Party
2022	Surabhi Singh	Apna Dal

== Election results ==
=== 2027 ===
2027 Uttar Pradesh Legislative Assembly election: Kaimganj
Party	Candidate	Votes	%	±%
INDIA				
NDA				
BSP				
NOTA	None of the above			
Majority				
Turnout				
gain from		Swing		

=== 2022 ===
2022 Uttar Pradesh Legislative Assembly election: Kaimganj
Party	Candidate	Votes	%	±%
AD(S)	Surabhi Singh	114,952	47.65	
SP	Sarvesh Ambedkar	96,409	39.97	+5.83
BSP	Durga Prasad	18,443	7.65	−5.8
Jan Adhikar Party	Arun Kumar	4,664	1.93	
INC	Shakuntala Devi	2,244	0.93	
NOTA	None of the above	1,618	0.67	−0.18
Majority		18,543	7.68	−7.95
Turnout		241,231	61.46	+0.22
AD(S) gain from BJP		Swing		

2017 Uttar Pradesh Legislative Assembly Election: Kaimgan
Party	Candidate	Votes	%	±%
BJP	Amar Singh Khatik	116,304	49.77	
SP	Surabhi Singh	79,779	34.14	
BSP	Ram Swaroop Gautam	31,437	13.45	
NOTA	None of the above	1,964	0.85	
Majority		36,525	15.63	
Turnout		233,683	61.24	
