= Manvendra Singh (Mathura politician) =

Indian politician

Manvendra Singh ( 13 Dec 1947, Agra (Uttar Pradesh)) is a leader of Indian National Congress from Uttar Pradesh. He served as member of the Lok Sabha representing Mathura (Lok Sabha constituency). He was elected to 8th, 9th and 14th Lok Sabha.
