= Khurshed Alam Khan =

Indian politician (1919–2013)

7th Governor of Karnataka
- In office 6 January 1992 – 2 December 1999
- Chief Minister: Sarekoppa Bangarappa; Veerappa Moily; H. D. Deve Gowda; J. H. Patel; S. M. Krishna
- Preceded by: Bhanu Pratap Singh
- Succeeded by: V.S. Ramadevi

2nd Governor of Goa
- In office 18 July 1989 – 17 March 1991
- Chief Minister: Pratapsingh Rane; Churchill Alemao; Luis Proto Barbosa; Ravi Naik
- Preceded by: Gopal Singh
- Succeeded by: Bhanu Prakash Singh

Member of Parliament, Lok Sabha
- In office 1984–1989
- Preceded by: Daya Ram Shakya
- Succeeded by: Santosh Bhartiya
- Constituency: Farrukhabad

Member of Parliament, Rajya Sabha
- In office 5 July 1980 – 6 December 1984
- Constituency: Uttar Pradesh
- In office 16 April 1974 – 15 April 1980
- Constituency: Delhi

Personal details
- Born: Khurshed Alam Khan; 5 February 1919 Farrukhabad, United Provinces of Agra and Oudh, British India (now in Uttar Pradesh, India)
- Died: 20 July 2013 (aged 94) Delhi, India
- Party: Indian National Congress
- Spouse: Saeeda Khurshid
- Relations: Zakir Husain (father-in-law); Shah Jahan Begum (mother-in-law)
- Children: Rehana Mishra, Neelofer Menon, Anjum Majid Shirazi & Salman Khurshid
- Education: Dr. Bhimrao Ambedkar University; University of Pennsylvania
- Occupation: Politician

Khurshed Alam Khan (5 February 1919 – 20 July 2013) was an Indian politician and a senior leader of the Indian National Congress political party.

He was Governor of Karnataka from 1991 to 1999 and governor of Goa from 1989 to 1991. Before that, he was Union minister of External affairs in Government of India. He was associated with Jamia Millia Islamia.

== Early life ==
Khurshed Alam Khan was born on 5 February 1919 in Pitaura, Kaimganj, Farrukhabad District of Uttar Pradesh into a Muslim family of Pashtun descent, tracing their lineage to the Afridi and Kheshgi Tribes of Afghanistan. After his early education, he joined the Agra University as a student of St. John's College, where, he obtained bachelor's and master's degree in History. He was also a student at the University of Pennsylvania, U.S.A., where he completed a course in Management Studies.

Khan had an interest in education. He was a member of the Governing Body of Dr. Zakir Husain Memorial College, New Delhi. He served as Chairman of the Board of Governors of the YMCA Institute of Engineering, Faridabad. His abiding interest had been in the Jamia Millia Islamia University at Delhi.

== Political career ==
It was through the efforts of Khan that Parliament enacted a Law whereby the Jamia Millia Islamia became an independent University. Khurshed Alam Khan was the Chancellor of this university. He was also member of Council of Indian Institutes of Technology.

Khurshed Alam Khan was a Parliamentarian for over 15 years as a member of the Rajya Sabha and the Lok Sabha. He was the member of the Rajya Sabha from 1974 to 1984 and the member of the 8th Lok Sabha from 1984 to 1989, representing Farrukhabad constituency. He was a Member of the Union Council of ministers and has handled various portfolios, namely, External Affairs, Tourism, Civil Aviation, Textiles and Commerce.

As minister for External Affairs, he toured extensively in the world. He addressed the United Nations Security Council on several occasions. The Foreign ministers' Conference of Non-Aligned Countries at Delhi and Luanda was presided over by him. In 1988, he represented India at the Republican Party Convention of the U.S.A.

He resigned his Lok Sabha seat when he was appointed the Governor of Goa on 18 July 1989. He also officiated as the Governor of Maharashtra. He has been the Governor of Karnataka since 6 January 1991. He also officiated as the Governor of Kerala.

The areas of special interest to Khurshed Alam Khan were education, tourism, transport and urban development. Reading and Horticulture were favorite pastimes to which he devoted considerable time. Khurshed Alam Khan was the son-in-law of Dr. Zakir Hussain, the third President of India, married to his older daughter, Saeeda Khurshid. Salman Khurshid, former Union Minister for External Affairs (Indian Foreign Minister), is the son of Khurshed Alam Khan. He also has three daughters. He also has several grandchildren, and was also present for a large part of his great-grandchildren's lives.
