= Narendra Singh Yadav =

Indian politician

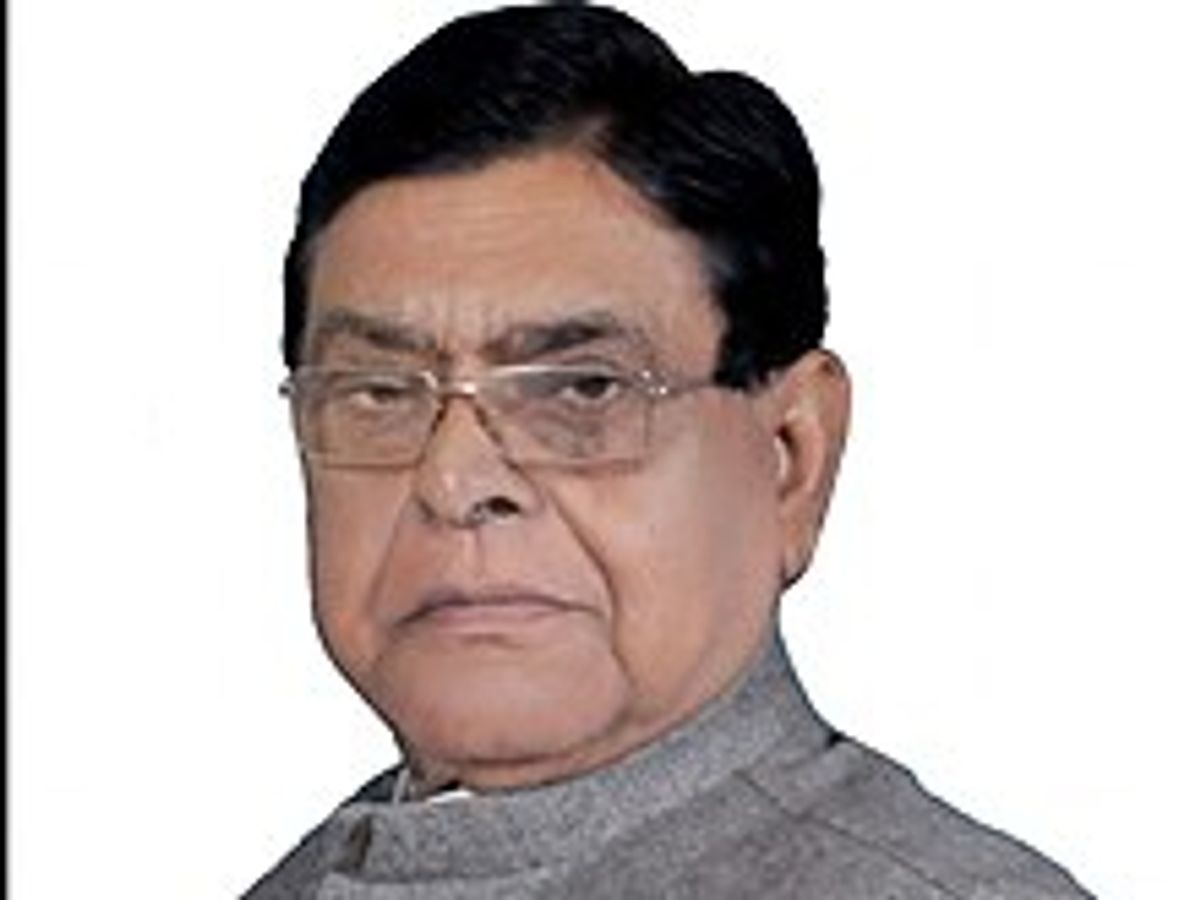

Narendra Singh Yadav (born 7 July 1950) is an Indian politician, statesman, and philanthropist hailing from the state of Uttar Pradesh. He is the son of the Indian politician and statesman, Mr. Rajendra Singh Yadav, one of the founding members of Praja Socialist Party, who served as a minister and was elected as an MLA seven times from the Shamshabad and Mohammadabad assembly constituencies in the Farrukhabad District.

== Political career ==
Narendra Singh Yadav has been elected as a Member of the Legislative Assembly (MLA) six times and has held the position of a cabinet minister in the government led by Mulayam Singh Yadav, and was Minister of Home Guard, Technical and Higher Education during Akhilesh Yadav government, making significant policy and administrative contributions.

Narendra Singh Yadav's political career began in 1985 when he won the Uttar Pradesh Assembly elections as a candidate from the Indian National Congress, defeating the opposition candidate by a significant margin of 61,950 votes. He garnered 71,267 votes, while his closest rival, Kunwar Amarjeet Singh, secured only 9,317 votes.

In 1989, Yadav faced a closely contested election, narrowly losing to a candidate from the Janta Dal Party, Suresh Chander Singh Yadav, by a margin of 404 votes. Following the formation of the Samajwadi Party and his close association with Mulayam Singh Yadav, Yadav joined the party. He went on to be elected as an MLA in 1991, 1996, 1997, 2002, and 2012, representing the Mohammadabad constituency initially and later becoming the first MLA from the Amritpur Assembly constituency.

Notably, in 2014, Mr. Yadav was relieved of his ministerial position in the Uttar Pradesh Government due to his son, Sachin Singh Yadav, contesting as an independent candidate in the Farrukhabad Lok Sabha Constituency, challenging the Samajwadi Party candidate.

As of the most recent developments, Narendra Singh Yadav is currently affiliated with the Bharatiya Janata Party (BJP), signifying a significant political transition in his career. His influence extends beyond party lines, as he is widely recognized as the foremost grassroots leader in the Farrukhabad region and the neighboring Potato Belt. He held the pivotal role of distributing Samajwadi Party election tickets in the Farrukhabad district at one point, underlining his importance in regional politics.

== Awards ==
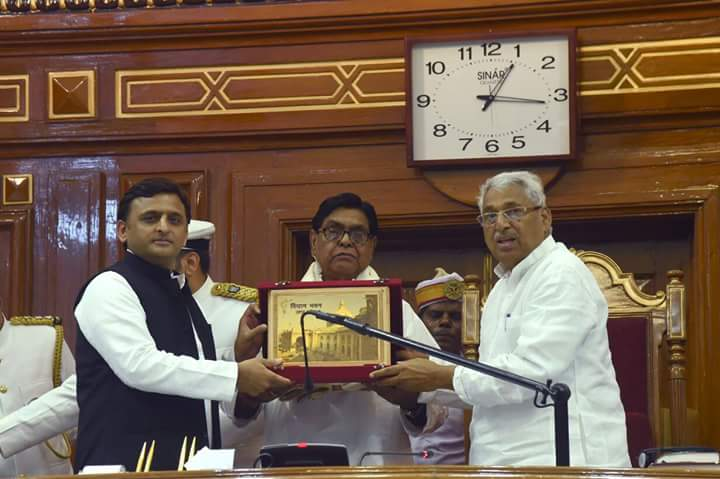
Narendra Singh Yadav being honored by Chief Minister Akhilesh Yadav and speaker Ramesh Yadav on the completion of 30 years in the Uttar Pradesh Legislative Assembly.

Narendra Singh Yadav achieved recognition for his service to the people of Uttar Pradesh. He was awarded the title of the "Best MLA" by the Honorable Speaker of the Uttar Pradesh Assembly and the Uttar Pradesh Government during the tenure from 2012 to 2017.

== Education ==
Yadav is a graduate in L.L.B. from Lucknow University.
