= Ram Manohar Lohia =

Indian socialist (1910–1967)

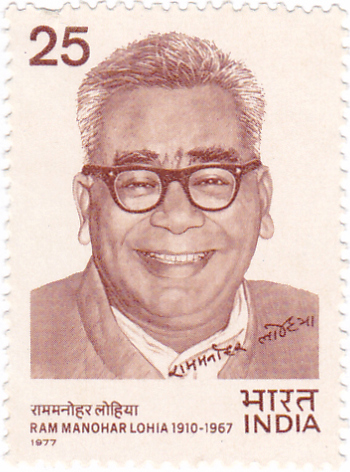
- Lohia on a 1977 stamp of India

Member of Parliament, Lok Sabha
- In office 1967–1967
- Preceded by: Constituency established
- Succeeded by: S. N. Mishra
- Constituency: Kannauj
- In office 1963–1967
- Preceded by: Mulchand Dube
- Succeeded by: Awadhesh Chandra Singh Rathore
- Constituency: Farrukhabad

Personal details
- Born: 23 March 1910 Akbarpur, United Provinces of Agra and Oudh, British India
- Died: 12 October 1967 (aged 57) New Delhi, India
- Party: Congress Socialist Party; Indian National Congress; Praja Socialist Party; Socialist Party of India; Samyukta Socialist Party
- Education: University of Calcutta (BA); Humboldt University of Berlin (PhD)
- Known for: Quit India Movement; Indian independence movement

Ram Manohar Lohia (23 March 1910 – 12 October 1967) was an Indian political activist of the Indian independence movement and a socialist politician. As a nationalist, he worked actively to protest against colonialism, raising awareness of the same. He founded multiple socialist political parties and later won elections to the Lok Sabha.

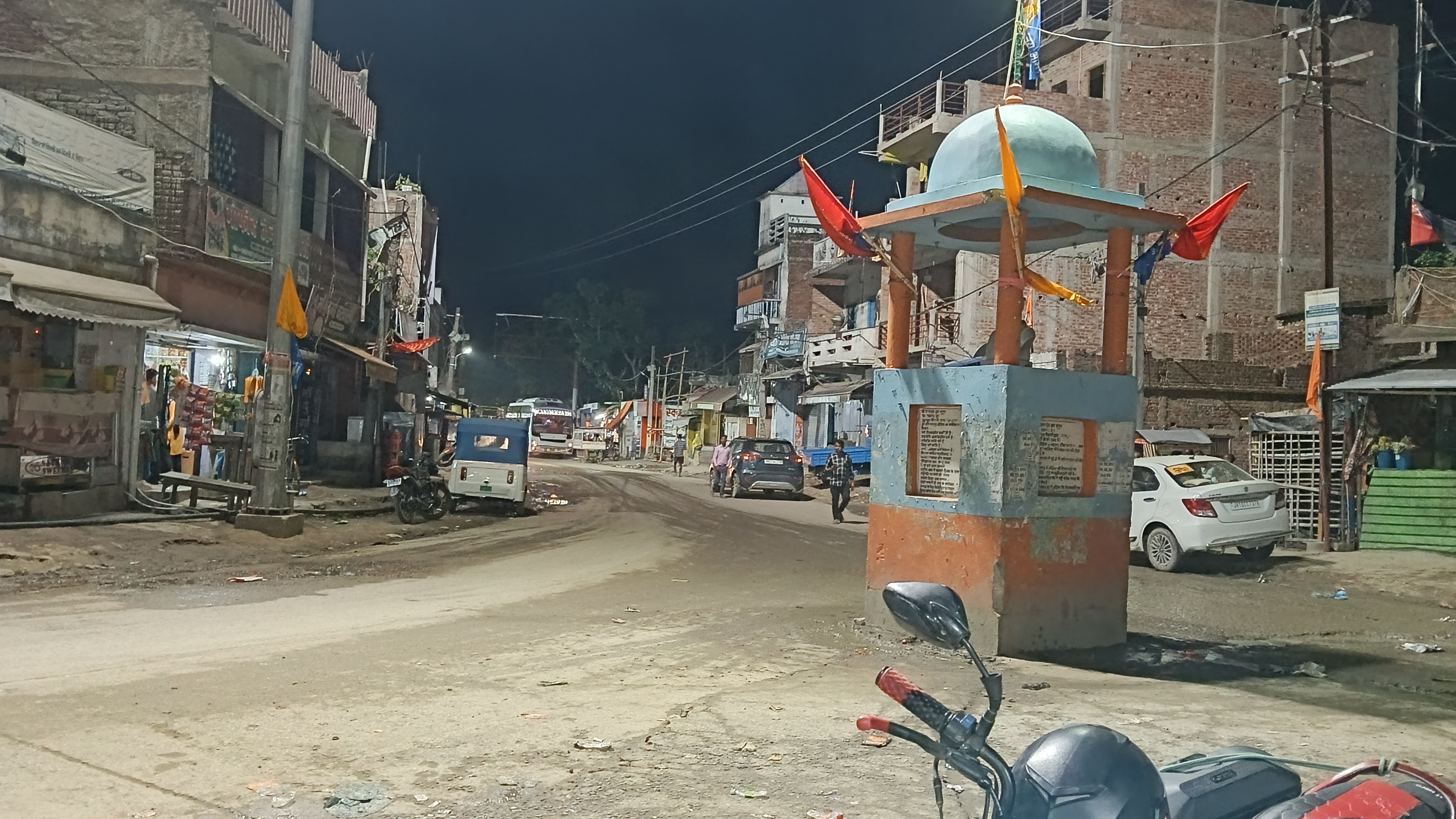
View of Lohia Chowk in Benipatti town - "A legacy attributed to his name".

== Early life ==
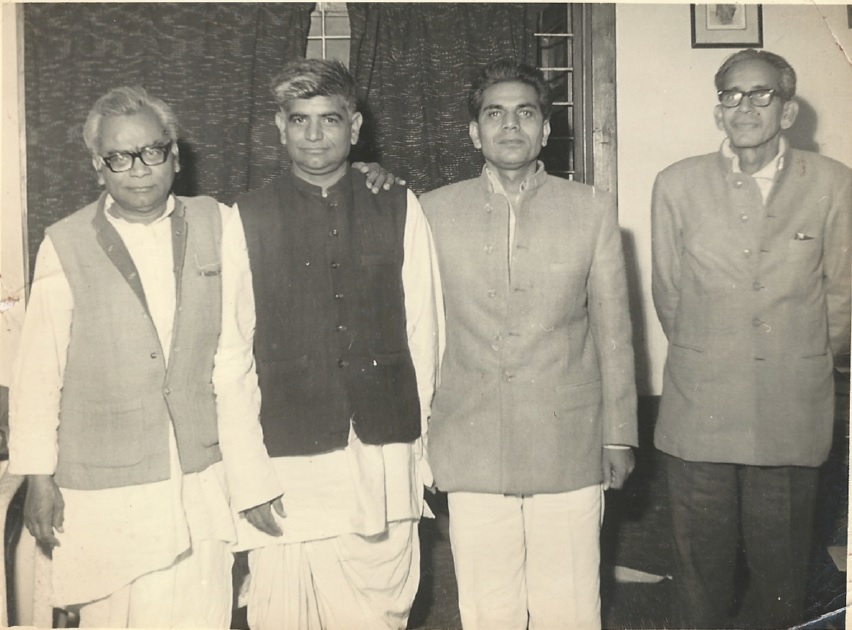
Dr Ram Manohar Lohia, Mani Ram Bagri, Madhu Limaye, S. M. Joshi

Ram Manohar Lohia was born on 23 March 1910 in a Marwari Bania family at Akbarpur, Ambedkar nagar in modern-day Uttar Pradesh. In 1912, when he was only two years old, his mother died. He was then raised by his father, Hiralal, who never remarried. In 1918, he moved with his father to Bombay, and then completed his high school education there. After securing the first position in his school at the matriculation examination, he completed his intermediate studies from the Banaras Hindu University in 1927. In 1929, he completed his Bachelor of Arts from the Vidyasagar College, under the University of Calcutta.

In 1929, Lohia went to England for further studies. However, the political environment in London did not align with Lohia's nationalist feelings, leading him to leave the country. Lohia then decided to join the Frederick William University in Berlin, Germany. He then learnt German and won a scholarship to pursue a doctorate in economics from 1929 to 1933. While studying here, Lohia wrote his Ph.D. thesis paper on the topic of Salt Taxation in India, focusing on Gandhi's socio-economic theory. However, he never completed the degree. (Note: In The Life and Times of George Fernandes, Rahul Ramagundam describes, "he never submitted a printed copy of his thesis to the university and therefore was never awarded a degree".) Lohia was greatly influenced by the events that took place in Germany during his stay there, including the rise of Hitler and Nazism. He also studied the works of Marx and Engels during this time.

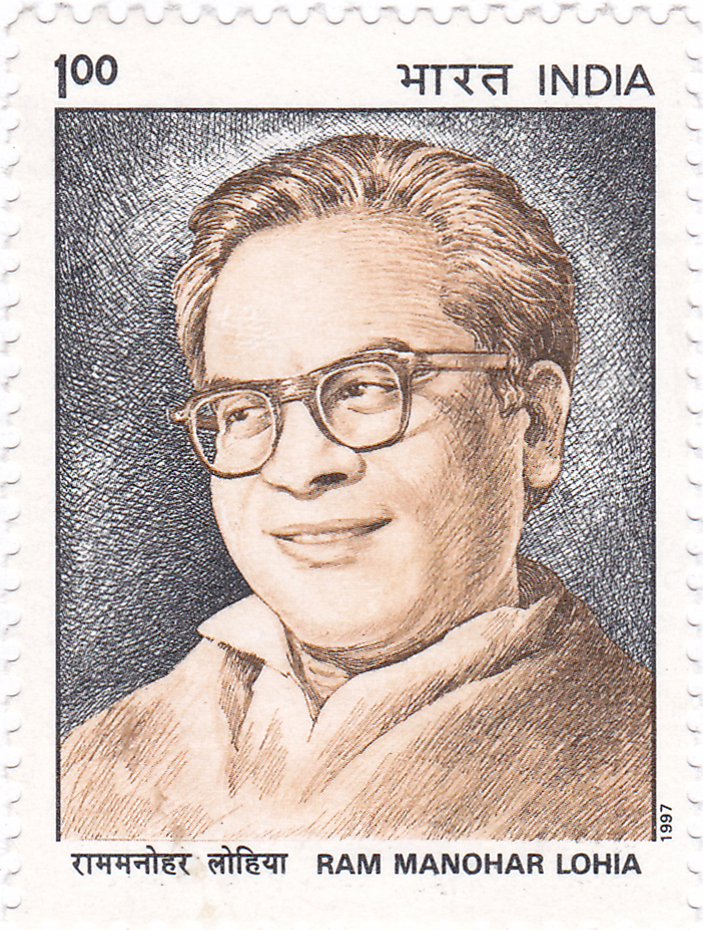
Lohia on a 1997 stamp of India

== Nationalist movement (1930–1947) ==
=== 1930: League of Nations session ===
While studying economics at Berlin University, Lohia met Goan political leader Julião Menezes, who was studying medicine. They soon became friends and were part of the Indian Students' Union in Berlin, Weimar Republic. In 1930, during the session of the League of Nations, Lohia and Menezes, who were present on the occasion, threw bundles of leaflets from the visitors' gallery. These leaflets denounced Ganga Singh, the then Maharaja of Bikaner (now Rajasthan), and an Indian representative sent by the British Crown to present to the League of Nations.

=== 1934–1938: Congress Socialist Party ===
Lohia helped found the Congress Socialist Party in 1934. He was also the editor of its publication, the Congress Socialist. In 1936, Jawaharlal Nehru chose Lohia as the secretary of the Foreign Department of the All India Congress Committee (AICC). In 1938, Lohia resigned as the secretary.

It was at this time that Lohia began to develop his own political views. He critically examined the opinions of the Congress leadership, which was greatly influenced by Gandhi, and the Communists who had joined the CSP.

=== 1940–1942: Anti-war efforts ===
As World War II intensified, Lohia began anti-war propaganda. He was critical of the Congress Party leadership's decision to support the British government in the war, stating that the British would not grant India freedom if the Congress cooperated with them. In June 1940, he was arrested and sentenced to a jail term of two years for delivering anti-war speeches. After the Cripps Mission was sent to India, Gandhi and Lohia together opposed it. Lohia stated that Britain would not grant India freedom on its own. Nehru, however, desired independence but refused to take an anti-war stand. Subsequently, Lohia criticized Nehru at the May 1942 session of the AICC, held in Allahabad.

=== 1942–1946: Quit India Movement ===
During the Quit India Movement, Lohia became an important leader after the arrest of both Gandhi and Nehru. Lohia set up the clandestine radio stations called the Congress Radio in Calcutta and Bombay. In his words, he intended to "disseminate the much needed information to the masses to sustain a leaderless movement". He was then captured and imprisoned in Lahore Fort in 1944. Lohia and Jayaprakash Narayan, who had assembled a guerilla force during the same movement, were then released on 11 April 1946.

=== 1946: Goa Revolution Day ===
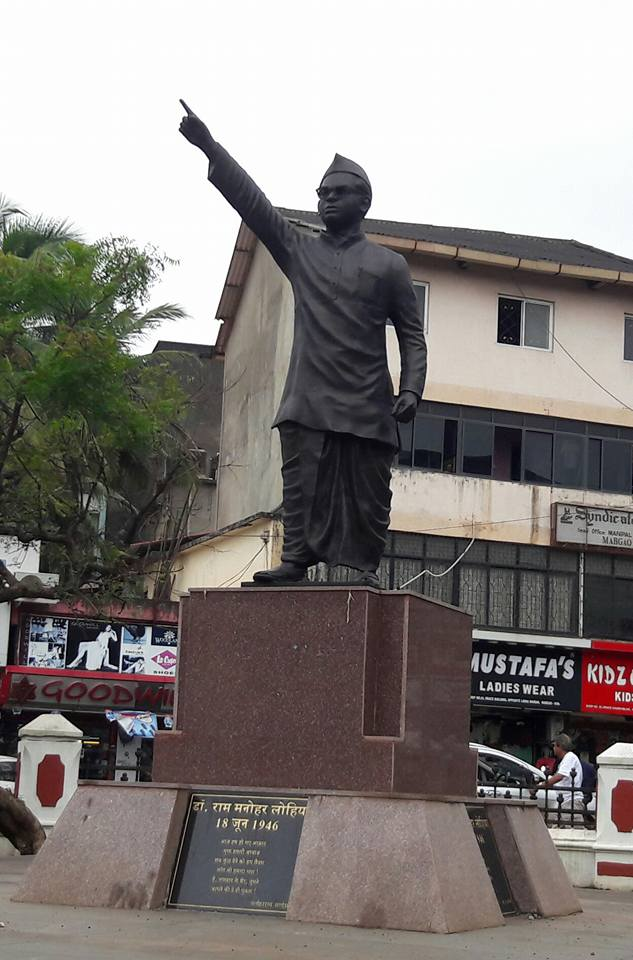
Statue of Lohia in Margao, Goa, at the location where he delivered his speech on 18 June 1946.

Following his release, Lohia met his friend Julião Menezes in Bombay for a medical consultation in April 1946. Menezes then invited Lohia to recuperate with him at his home in Goa. They reached Menezes' Goa home on 10 June 1946. After the news of Lohia's arrival spread, the general public and other local freedom fighters began visiting Lohia in large numbers. Menezes and Lohia then began planning a civil disobedience movement. Over the next few days, they addressed people around Goa, informing people that they would defy the ban on public meetings and address an audience of Goans on 18 June in the city of Margao.

On 18 June 1946, Menezes and Lohia arrived at the designated maidan in Margao, evading and defying the Portuguese police. They were greeted by a large crowd that was chanting slogans. About 600–700 people gathered before the duo was physically escorted to the police station, just as Lohia had begun addressing the audience. The police resorted to a baton charge to disperse the crowd. However, everyone regrouped at the police station and only left after Lohia addressed them briefly. The location of the gathering is today known as Lohia Maidan, and the date, 18 June, is celebrated as Goa Revolution Day.

Over the next few months, Gandhi publicly supported Lohia in his efforts to free Goa. Lohia arrived back to Goa in September 1946 but was immediately arrested and jailed for 10 days at Aguada Jail.

=== 1947: Peace mission in Calcutta ===
On the eve of the India's Independence Day, 14 August 1947, Lohia and Gandhi together helped maintain the peace between Hindus and Muslims in Calcutta. After riots on 31 August, Gandhi went on an indefinite fast. Lohia then took up a peace mission, working with rioters and gathering their weapons. His mission was successful in stopping the riots, following which Gandhi ended his fast.

== Early political career (1948–1962) ==
=== 1948–1950: Split from INC, Hind Kisan Panchayat, support for Nepali Congress ===
Following the assassination of Gandhi in 1948, the Socialists Party grew apart from the Indian National Congress (INC). At the INC session at Nashik in March 1948, the Socialists decided to leave the INC. Further, they resolved to protest for the immediate integration of the princely states into India. This protest led to Lohia's arrest in January 1950 at Rewa, Madhya Pradesh.

In 1949, the Socialists had founded the Hind Kisan Panchayat, with Lohia as its first President. Also in 1949, Lohia encouraged the Nepali Congress leaders to protest for democracy in Nepal. He led a large protest to the Embassy of Nepal in New Delhi, which led to his arrest and imprisonment for two months.

=== 1951–1954: Asian Socialist Conference and farmers' protest ===
In 1951, Lohia attended the International Socialist Congress in Frankfurt. Between 1952 and 1954, he attempted to unite Asian socialists under the banner of Asian Socialist Conference. However, his success was limited due to differences between the Indians and other Asians. Lohia's motivation behind this was that organizations like the Communist International (Comintern) and the Socialist International were under the influence of white people.

In 1954, he led a farmers' protest in Uttar Pradesh. This was to protest the high tax rates for water. As the protest intensified, Lohia was arrested under the Special Powers Act, 1932.

=== 1952–1955: Praja Socialist Party and later split ===
In 1952, the Socialist Party joined the Acharya Kripalani's Kisan Mazdoor Praja Party to form the Praja Socialist Party (PSP). Lohia was elected its president in 1953.

In 1954, in Kerala, the Congress-PSP coalition government fired at peaceful protesters. Lohia was upset about this and asked PSP's Pattom Thanu Pillai, the Chief Minister, to resign. When Pillai refused, Lohia himself resigned as president. In 1955, his relationship with the PSP was further strained after the PSP proposed to join the Congress government. Further, Lohia did not participate in talks with Jayaprakash Narayan and Nehru. He was also not happy about the PSP's policy to be the Opposition party to the ruling Congress party. This led to his removal from the PSP. Thus, in December 1955, Lohia founded the Socialist Party at a meeting in Hyderabad, in which he was elected president. He advocated a programme of "Power within seven years" at this meeting, referring to the proposed rise of socialism in the country.

=== 1955–1957: Socialist Party ===
Some points that the new Socialist Party fought for were the abolishment of the caste system, equal opportunities for all, classless bogies in trains, moving away from the English language and opposition of the rich English medium schools. The Party initiated multiple protests across the country for the upliftment of farmers and the landless. In 1957 and 1962, it launched nation-wide satyagrahas on these issues. Lohia even went to jail in 1957.

He, along with other party members, contested elections in 1957. While Lohia lost the Lok Sabha elections, the Party won seats in Legislative assemblies in multiple states across the country.

=== 1960–1962: NEFA, Tamil Nadu protest and election loss ===
In 1960, Lohia led a satyagraha to enter into the North-East Frontier Agency (NEFA) and was arrested. In 1961, he was attacked with stones at an anti-English language meeting in Tamil Nadu. In 1962, he fought the Lok Sabha elections in Phulpur Lok Sabha constituency against Nehru but was defeated.

== Later political career (1963–1967) ==
=== 1963–1965: First election win and US satyagraha ===
In 1963, Lohia won the by-election in Farrukhabad Lok Sabha constituency. The Statesman sarcastically described his entry into the Lok Sabha as that of "a bull in a China shop". During his term, he raised several issues in Parliament. The most significant of these was his 1963 speech in the Parliament, in which he exposed the fact that 2.7 crore Indians lived on 3 annas (barely 20 paisa) a day. He also criticized the government's Five Year Plan, calling its expenditure of 10,000 crores as wasteful, stating that it was only in an attempt to imitate the European ways of living.

In 1964, he toured the United States, launching a satyagraha against racism there. After he entered a hotel which had denied entry to the Blacks, he was briefly arrested. The US Administration later apologized for this.

=== 1965–1967: Samyukta Socialist Party and Samyukta Vidhayak Dal ===
By 1965, the Socialists across the country decided to merge, so as to defeat the ruling Congress Party. The Socialist Party then merged with the Praja Socialist Party to form the Samyukta Socialist Party.

In 1967, under Lohia's leadership, the Samyukta Socialist Party defeated the Congress in seven states (including Uttar Pradesh), forming the government there. This was part of an alliance that was formed by Lohia and Bharatiya Jana Sangh leader Nanaji Deshmukh. This coalition was referred to as the Samyukta Vidhayak Dal.

However, soon after, Lohia realised that the newly elected ministers from his Party were seeking power instead of implementing socialist principles. While this affected him, he continued to guide them.

In 1967, Lohia won the elections from the newly created Kannauj Lok Sabha constituency, which was split from the Farrukhabad Lok Sabha constituency. Due to strong opposition from the Congress, he won with a majority of only 472 votes.

== Death ==
In 1978, former Union Health Minister Raj Narain reported that Lohia may have died due to medical negligence. Lohia was a diabetic and a hypertensive patient. A commission appointed by the Union government to inquire into the cause of his death found that he had undergone an operation, during which one of the stitches was not properly done. This led to excessive bleeding, leading to his death at the age of 57 on 12 October 1967.

Lohia had no personal wealth when he died. He also had no house. At his funeral, Jayaprakash Narayan stated that "Dr Lohia was the messiah of the poor in India".

== Political and social views ==
Lohia repeatedly criticized Nehru's work. He also advocated against the extensive use of English language, leading an extensive campaign for the same. Lohia also publicly questioned the dominance of Upper Castes and advocated for affirmative action that was caste-based.

In 1963, Lohia proposed the idea of Saptakranti (transl. Seven Revolutions). He stated that mankind is revolting for:

- Equality between man and woman;
- The abolition of inequalities based on colour;
- Elimination of inequalities of birth and caste;
- National freedom or ending of foreign influence;
- Economic equality through increase in production;
- Protecting the privacy of individual life from all collective encroachments; and
- Limitations on armaments

Also in 1963, he spoke about the unity of Hindus and Muslims, requesting them to rethink the last 800 years of India's history.

Lohia believed that for the country to progress, caste inequality must be abolished. To implement this, he proposed the idea of "roti and beti", stating that people must first be willing to break caste barriers and eat the same roti, and then let their daughters (beti) marry people from other castes. Lohia also believed in the empowerment of women.

== Works ==
=== Major writings in English ===
- The Caste System: Hyderabad, Navahind [1964] 147 p.
- Foreign Policy: Aligarh, P.C. Dwadash Shreni, [1963?] 381 p.
- Fragments of World Mind: Maitrayani Publishers & Booksellers; Allahabad [1949] 262 p.
- Fundamentals of a World Mind: ed. by K.S. Karanth. Bombay, Sindhu Publications, [1987] 130 p.
- Guilty Men of India’s Partition: Lohia Samata Vidyalaya Nyas, Publication Dept.,[1970] 103 p.
- India, China, and Northern Frontiers: Hyderabad, Navahind [1963] 272 p.
- Interval During Politics: Hyderabad, Navahind [1965] 197 p.
- Marx, Gandhi and Socialism: Hyderabad, Navahind [1963] 550 p.
- Collected Works of Dr Lohia A nine volume set edited by veteran Socialist writer Dr Mastram Kapoor in English and published by Anamika Publications, New Delhi.
- Bandh Samrat - Tales of Eternal Rebel George Fernandes: Chris Emmanuel Dsouza, Bangalore, Cleverfox Publications[2022] 27 p.

=== Writings in Kannada Translation ===
- The complete works of Dr. Ram Manohar Lohia were translated and published in six volumes by the Government of Karnataka at the subsidized price.
- There were lot of books available in Kannada about Lohia and also many private publications published the works of Lohia.

== Legacy ==
=== Memorials ===
- Avadh University in Faizabad was renamed as "Dr. Ram Manohar Lohia Avadh University".
- The Dr. Ram Manohar Lohiya National Law University in Lucknow, one of India's top National law schools, is named after him.
- 18th June Road, in Panjim, Goa, is named after him. It was that date in 1946 where he launched an agitation against colonial rule.
- The Willingdon Hospital of New Delhi was renamed Ram Manohar Lohia Hospital in the 1970s. Ram Manohar Lohia died in this hospital due to health complications following a surgery.
- Dr. Ram Manohar Lohia Institute of Medical Sciences is a medical institute for undergraduate and postgraduate studies in Lucknow.
- Dr. Ram Manohar Lohiya Bhawan is a community hall in his hometown of Akbarpur, Ambedkar Nagar and is the only memorial in his name.
- Dr Ram Manohar Lohiya Bhawan is an academic block of commerce department in Maharaja Ganga Singh University Bikaner.

=== In popular culture ===
Emraan Hashmi portrayed Lohia in the 2024 film, Ae Watan Mere Watan.

== See also ==
- Jagdeo Prasad
- Socialist Party (India)
