= Rajkumar Rawat =

Indian politician

Rajkumar Rawat राजकुमार रावत

MLA, 16th Legislative Assembly
- In office Mar 2012 – Mar 2017
- Preceded by: Puran Prakash
- Succeeded by: Thakur Karinda Singh
- Constituency: Goverdhan

MLA, 15th Legislative Assembly
- In office May 2007 – Mar 2012
- Preceded by: Prem Singh
- Succeeded by: None
- Constituency: Gokul

Personal details
- Born: 1 January 1967 (age 59) Mathura district
- Party: Bahujan Samaj Party
- Spouse: Vimlesh Rawat
- Children: 5
- Parent: Moolchand Rawat (father)
- Education: Not known
- Profession: Farmer and politician

Rajkumar Rawat (Hindi: राजकुमार रावत) is an Indian politician and a member of the 16th Legislative Assembly of India. He represents the Goverdhan constituency of Uttar Pradesh and is a member of the Bahujan Samaj Party political party.

== Early life and education ==
Rajkumar Rawat was born in Mathura district. He is educated till twelfth grade.

== Political career ==
Rajkumar Rawat has been a MLA for two terms. He represented the Goverdhan constituency and is a member of the Bahujan Samaj Party political party. He started his political career as Block Pramukh, Raya, Mathura in 1995. His wife Mrs. Vimlesh Rawat also became unopposed Block Pramukh of Raya in 2001. He was the first Brahmin candidate who won the Jat community dominated Gokul Constituency on the ticket of Bahujan Samaj Party in 2007.

== Posts held ==
#	From	To	Position	Comments
01	2012	Incumbent	Member, 16th Legislative Assembly	
02	2007	2012	Member, 15th Legislative Assembly	

== See also ==
- Goverdhan (Assembly constituency)
- Sixteenth Legislative Assembly of Uttar Pradesh
- Uttar Pradesh Legislative Assembly
