= Meghshyam Singh =

Member of the Uttar Pradesh Legislative Assembly
- Constituency: Mathura

Personal details
- Political party: Bharatiya Janata Party

Meghshyam Singh is an Indian politician and member of Uttar Pradesh Legislative Assembly representing the Goverdhan constituency in the Mathura district. He is a member of the Bharatiya Janata Party.
