= Chaudhary Digambar Singh =

Indian politician

Chaudhary Digambar Singh (9 June 1913 – 10 December 1995) was an Indian politician from the state of Uttar Pradesh. He was Member of Parliament in the Lok Sabha from Mathura. He was elected to the 3rd, 4th, and 7th Lok Sabha. He was affiliated with the Indian National Congress, and Janata Party (Secular).
