= Amar Singh Khatik =

Indian politician

MLA
- In office March 2017 – 22 March 2018
- Constituency: Kaimganj

Personal details
- Born: Amar Singh; 1 January 1945 (age 81) Farrukhabad
- Citizenship: India
- Party: Bharatiya Janata Party
- Spouse: Mrs. Ramamurthi Devi
- Children: 3 sons, 1 daughter
- Parent: Mr. Dwarka Prasad
- Education: Diploma in Mechanical Engineering
- Occupation: Politician
- Profession: Agriculture

Amar Khatik (also known as Amar Singh) is an Indian politician and a member of the Legislative Assembly of India. He represents the Kaimganj constituency of Uttar Pradesh and is a member of the Bhartiya Janata Party political party.

== Early life and education ==
Amar Singh Khatik was born in Farrukhabad district in Hindu Khateek family. He has completed Diploma in Mechanical Engineering.

== Political career ==
Amar Singh Khatik has been a MLA for one term. He represented the Kaimganj constituency and is a member of the Bhartiya Janata Party political party.
