= Mani Ram Bagri =

Indian politician (1920–2012)

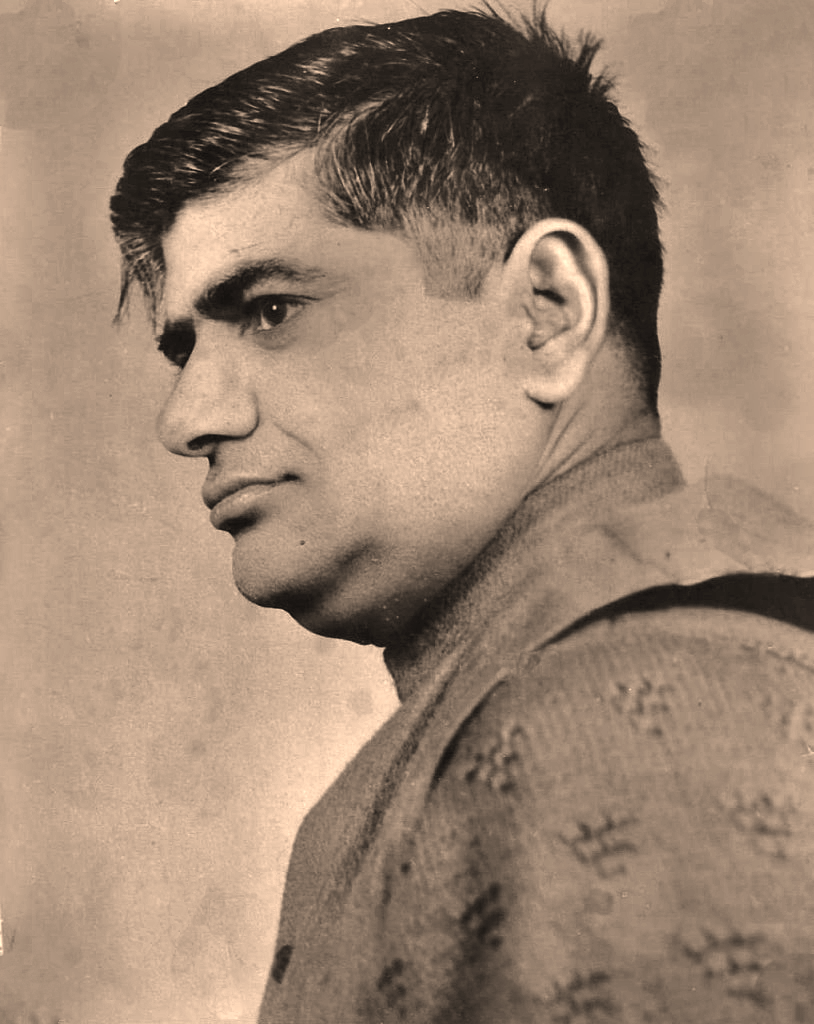

Member of Legislative Assembly
- Constituency: Fatehabad, Haryana

Member of Parliament 3rd Lok Sabha
- Constituency: Hisar, Haryana

Member of Parliament 6th Lok Sabha
- Constituency: Mathura, Uttar Pradesh

Member of Parliament 7th Lok Sabha
- Constituency: Hisar, Haryana

Personal details
- Born: 1 January 1920 Ban Mandori, Hisar, Punjab, British India
- Died: 31 January 2012 (aged 92) Hisar, Haryana
- Spouse: Dhani Devi
- Children: 5
- Profession: Activist, Politician

Ch. Mani Ram Bagri (1 January 1920 – 31 January 2012) was an Indian parliamentarian and political activist. He served three terms in the Indian Parliament, first from 1962 to 1967, and then again from 1977 to 1984 [Consisting of two terms: 1977-1980 and 1980-1984]. He belonged to the league of parliamentary opposition socialists like Dr. Ram Manohar Lohia and Jayaprakash Narayan.

Known widely throughout North India during his tenure as the "de facto" Leader of Opposition in the Lok Sabha, Bagri was widely considered to be one of the most prolific Socialist leaders of his time. He was party to the nation's international visits to the USSR, including the summit that led to the Tashkent Declaration, as well as the Warsaw Pact socialist republics in the 1960s. He is also notable for being the first speaker to address the International Parliamentary Conference in Hindi, his mother tongue.

== Early life and education, 1920-1947 ==
Mani Ram Bagri was born in the village of Ban Mandori, Hissar District, Haryana (erstwhile Panjab) on 1 January 1920. He participated in various national movements at a very young age and joined the Socialist movement led by Acharya Narendra Deva, Jayaprakash Narayan and Dr Rammanohar Lohia. Little is documented about his formative years, as he did not graduate from higher-level institutions. During his 20s, he developed a close friendship with Lohia, and the two remained allies both politically and personally, for the rest of their lives.

== Political career ==
Bagri was the undisputed leader of the Socialist parliamentary party during 1962–67, when Rammanohar Lohia entered the Lok Sabha through a by-election from Farukhabad. Mani Ram Bagri participated in and led various socialist movements. A close associate of late Dr Lohia and Raj Narain, he was also detained during Emergency under the Maintenance of Internal Security Act, and allegedly subject to sleep deprivation, mental harassment and a poor diet while imprisoned with other prominent Socialist leaders. Mani Ram Bagri was General Secretary of the All India Samyukta Socialist Party (Lohiavadi) during 1972–74, and later of Janata Party (S).

He represented Hisar and Mathura constituencies in the Indian Parliament. A three time Parliamentarian, he was a member of the 3rd Lok Sabha (2 April 1962 – 3 March 1967) as a Socialist member from Hisar (then part of Punjab state), the 6th Lok Sabha (23 March 1977 – 22 August 1979) as a Janata party member from Mathura (Uttar Pradesh) and the 7th Lok Sabha (10 January 1980 – 31 December 1984) as a Janata (S) member again from Hissar (Haryana).

Ch. Bagri at his home, early 1970s

In the 1960s. he and his team of socialists were invited to the Socialist Republic of Romania and to observe the proceedings of the Politburo. He remained close allies with Moscow, however, he disapproved of the indiscriminate Communist authoritarian state established there. He also represented India at the Tashkent Agreement following the 1965 Indo-Pakistan war, one of the few Opposition leaders present. Bagri officially retired from politics in the late 1980s, following the demise of Indira Gandhi and the 1984 Anti-Sikh riots, in which he played an active part in preventing harm from coming to innocent Sikh civilians in Delhi and Hisar.

=== Ideology and methods ===
Having risen from a very poor family, Bagri spent most of his life fighting for the underprivileged sections of the Indian society. His methods of doing so are generally described as Gandhian. He had joined politics at a young age and devoted his entire life to the poor's rights. He was a hardcore socialist and demanded the word of other Non-Congress parties in the government and this attitude earned him the honour of being the first Leader Of Opposition in the Lok Sabha. Bagri is widely regarded across party lines as having been a politician with impeccable integrity and ethics. He was renowned for living a frugal lifestyle and used to donate a large amount of his salary to the poor around Hissar, Delhi, amongst other such towns. Bagri was held in utmost esteem by successive Prime Ministers of India including Jawaharlal Nehru, Lal Bahadur Shastri, Morarji Desai, Charan Singh, Indira Gandhi, Rajiv Gandhi, Atal Bihari Vajpayee and Manmohan Singh. Despite representing a brand of socialist ideology often opposed to Congress' policies, Bagri shared a deep personal bond with Jawaharlal Nehru, Lal Bahadur Shastri and Indira Gandhi. Bagri played a pivotal role in shaping the nascent democracy in India, and gave a voice to millions of villagers, the poor and the downtrodden and represented their aspirations. He led many movements in North India championing the cause of the poor and the oppressed and is considered a major force in giving these weaker sections of society self-belief.

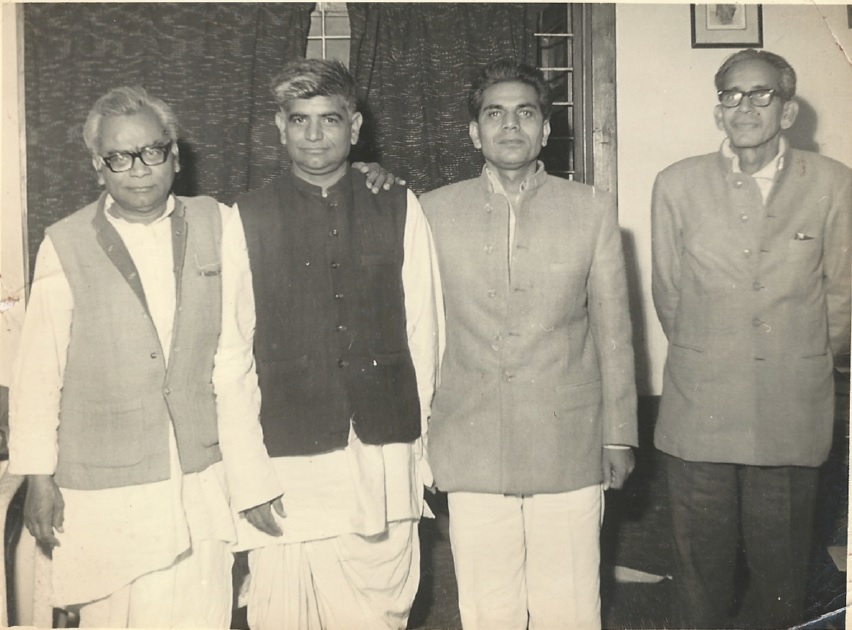
Dr Ram Manohar Lohia, Mani Ram Bagri, Madhu Limay, S M Joshi

Mr Bagri was an excellent communicator and a brilliant orator. One of Mr. Bagri's famous speeches in Parliament related to nationalization of Birla House which was owned by the Birla family. As the government was not very keen on this, Mr. Bagri being his usual fiery self thundered:

"My question is that the way Guru Tegh Bahadur’s place of martyrdom was commemorated in a foreign land, the way Ram, Krishna and other great people’s places of martyrdom was commemorated, then can the Government cite a reason that in their own country the site of martyrdom of the Father of the Nation cannot be commemorated? Actually the Government is sold out to the Birlas!".

— Sh. Mani Ram Bagri

Despite his rivalry between the Congress Leaders, he maintained a cordial relationship with prominent leaders such as Jawaharlal Nehru and Mahatma Gandhi.

He officially retired from politics in the late 1980s as the Indira Gandhi government slowly dissolved. He outlived most of his league-in-arms and spent the rest of his life at his residence in Hissar, and the chowk in which it is located is, till date, known in his honour as Bagri Chowk. Bagri, ailing for the past few years, died in Hissar on 31 January 2012 at the age of 92 years.

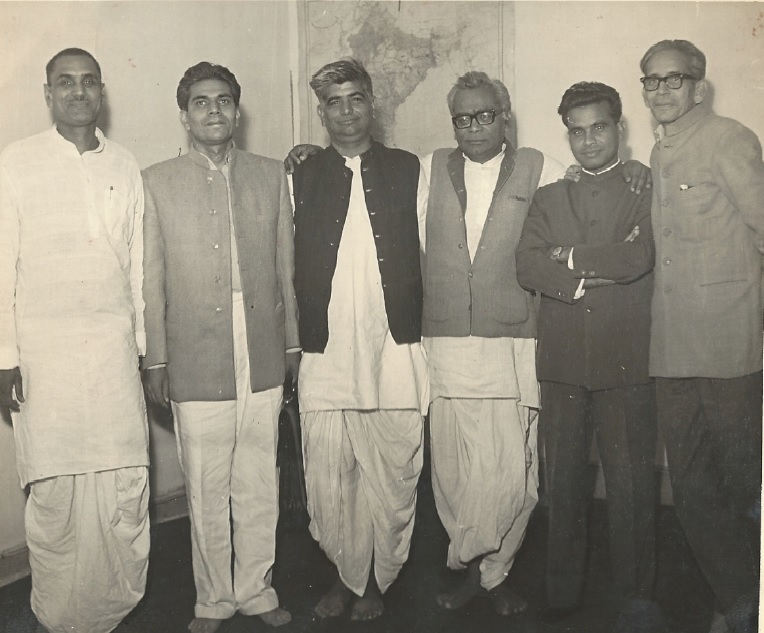
Ramdhari Singh, Madhu Limay, Mani Ram Bagri, Dr Ram Manohar Lohia, B P Maurya, and S M Joshi

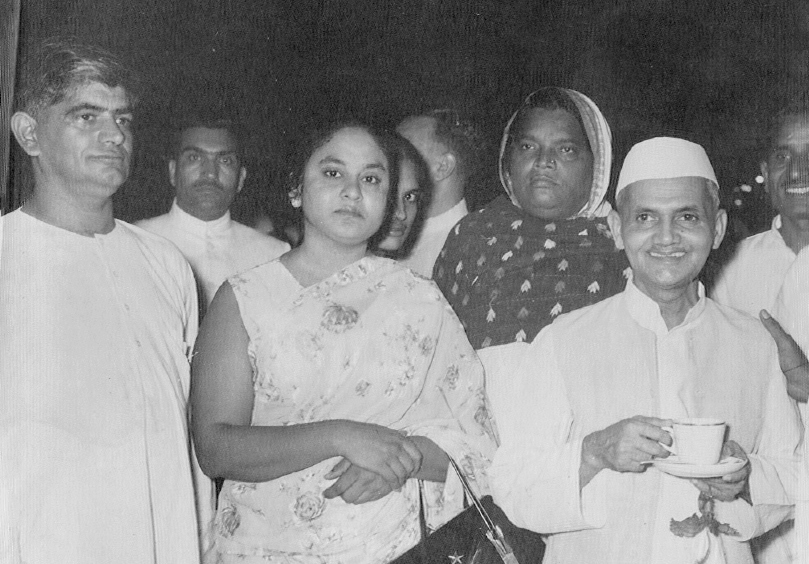
Sh. Mani Ram Bagri with Sh. Lal Bahadur Shastri

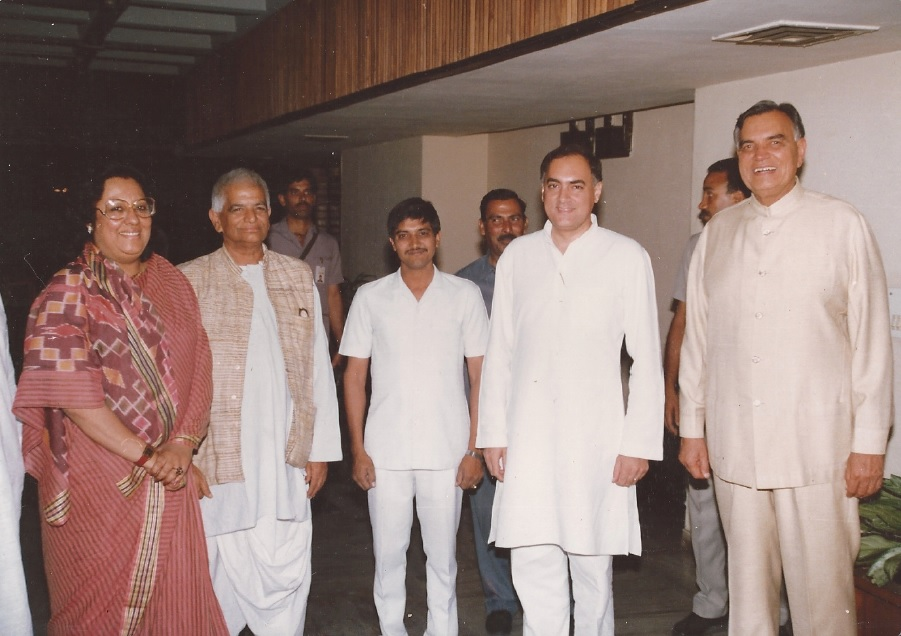
Najma Heptulla, Mani Ram Bagri, Subhash Bagri, Rajiv Gandhi, Balram Jakhar

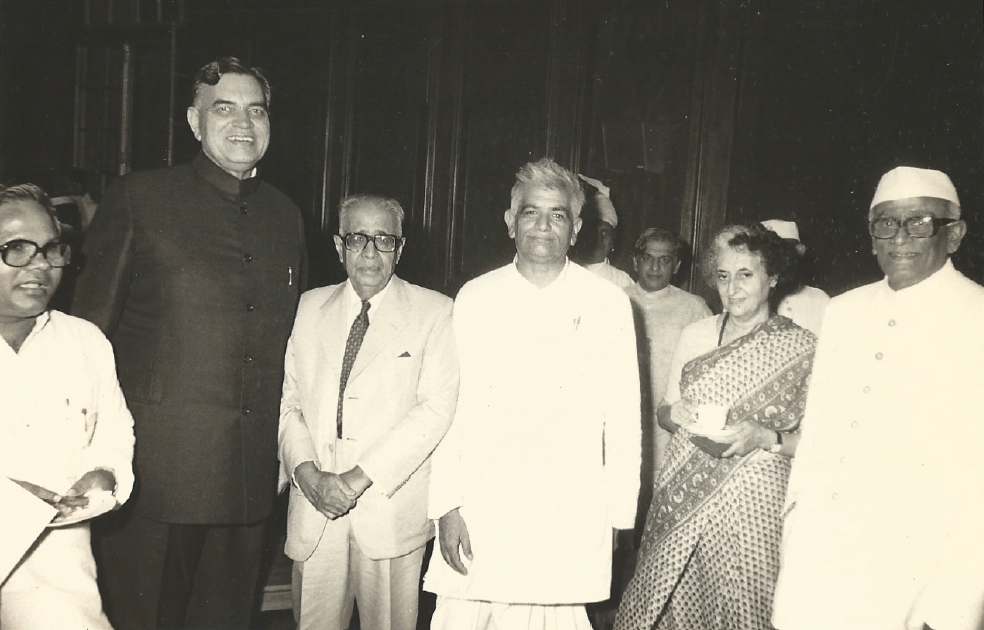
Balram Jakhar, Mohammad Hidayatulla, Mani Ram Bagri, Indira Gandhi, Neelam Sanjeeva Reddy

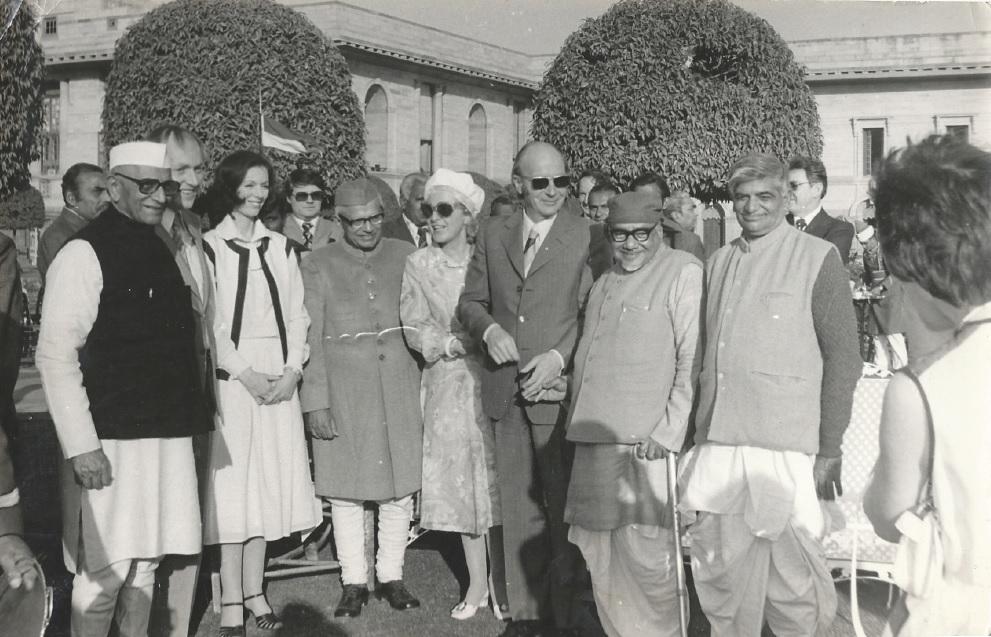
Ch. Mani Ram Bagri with friends
