= Rameshwar Singh Yadav =

Indian politician and MLA of 16th Assembly UP

MLA, Legislative Assembly of Uttar Pradesh
- In office March 2012 – March 2017
- Preceded by: Awadhpal Singh Yadav
- In office February 2002 – May 2007
- Succeeded by: Awadhpal Singh Yadav
- In office October 1996 – March 2002
- Preceded by: Awadhpal Singh Yadav
- Constituency: Aliganj (Assembly constituency)

Personal details
- Born: 19 March 1953 (age 73) Etah district
- Citizenship: Indian
- Party: Samajwadi Party
- Spouse: Rammurti Yadav (wife)
- Children: 2 sons & 2 daughters
- Parent(s): Lalaram Singh Yadav (father); Dhoopkali Devi (mother)
- Education: Janta Inter College
- Profession: Farmer, businessperson & politician

Rameshwar Singh Yadav is an Indian politician,Farmer,Gangster and a member of the Sixteenth Legislative Assembly of Uttar Pradesh in India. He represents the Aliganj constituency of Uttar Pradesh and is a member of the Samajwadi Party political party.

== Early life and education ==
Rameshwar Singh Yadav was born in Etah district. He attended the Janta Inter College and is educated politician.

== Political career ==
Rameshwar Singh Yadav has been an MLA for three terms. He represented the Aliganj constituency and is a member of the Samajwadi Party political party.

He fought the 2014 loksabha election from farrukhabad for samajwadi party and lost against Mukesh rajput He lost his seat in the 2017 Uttar Pradesh Assembly election to Satyapal Singh Rathore of the Bharatiya Janata Party.

He lost once again in the 2022 Uttar Pradesh Assembly election to Satyapal Singh Rathore of the Bharatiya Janata Party.

== Posts held ==
#	From	To	Position	Comments
01	2012	2017	Member, 16th Legislative Assembly	
02	2002	2007	Member, 14th Legislative Assembly	
03	1996	2002	Member, 13th Legislative Assembly	

== See also ==
- Aliganj (Assembly constituency)
- Sixteenth Legislative Assembly of Uttar Pradesh
- Uttar Pradesh Legislative Assembly
