= Chandra Bhushan Singh =

Indian politician

ChandraBhushan Singh

MP
- Constituency: Farrukhabad

Personal details
- Born: 14 October 1944 (age 81) Farrukhabad, Uttar Pradesh
- Party: Samajwadi Party
- Spouse: Santosh Rathore
- Children: 2 sons and 1 daughter
- As of 21 September, 2006

Chandra Bhushan Singh (born 14 October 1944), also known as Munnoo Babu, is an Indian politician who was a member of the 13th and 14th Lok Sabhas for Farrukhabad in Uttar Pradesh.
