= Farrukhabad district =

District of Uttar Pradesh in India

Coordinates: 27°30′N 79°30′E

- District of Uttar Pradesh
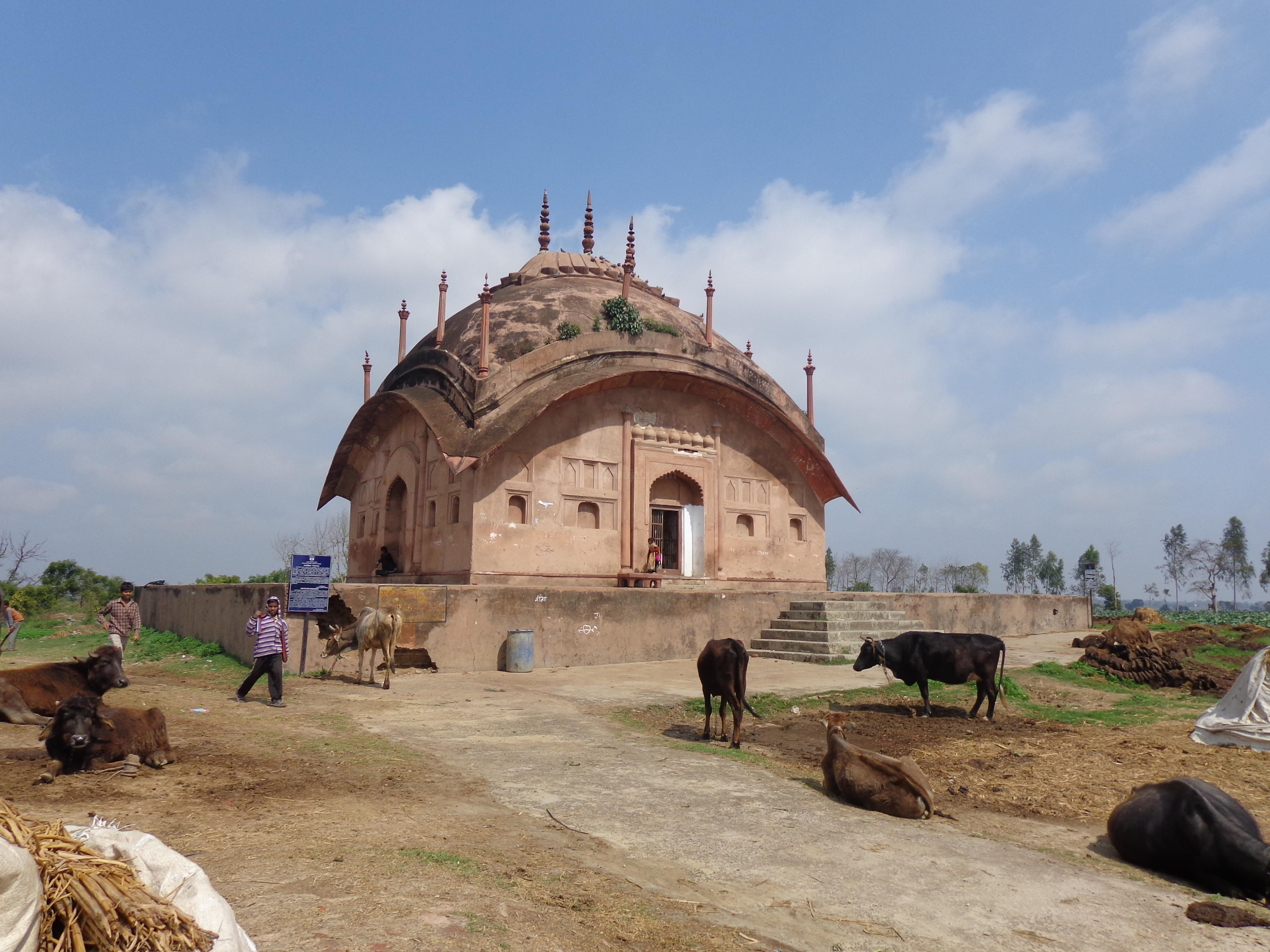
- Tomb of Nawab Rasheed Khan in Kaimganj

- Location of Farrukhabad district in Uttar Pradesh
- Country: India
- State: Uttar Pradesh
- Division: Kanpur
- Headquarters: Fatehgarh
- Tehsils: 3

Government
  - Lok Sabha constituencies: Farrukhabad
  - Vidhan Sabha constituencies: 4

Area
  - Total: 2,181 km^{2} (842 sq mi)

Population (2011)
  - Total: 1,885,204
  - Density: 864.4/km^{2} (2,239/sq mi)
  - Urban: 416,185

Demographics
  - Literacy: 69.04%
  - Sex ratio: 874
- Time zone: UTC+05:30 (IST)
- Major highways: 3
- Website: farrukhabad.nic.in

Farrukhabad district is a district of the Uttar Pradesh state of India. The town of Fatehgarh is the district headquarters. The district is part of the Kanpur division.

Farrukhabad is situated between Lat. 26° 46' N & 27° 43' N and Long. 79° 7' E & 80° 2' E. The district is bounded by Badaun and Shahjahanpur on the north, the Hardoi district on the east, the Kannauj district on the south, and the Etah and Mainpuri districts on the west. The Ganga River and Ramganga River are located to the east, and the Kali River to the south.

The district formerly included the present-day Kannauj district. It was divided into two separate districts on 18 September 1997. Farrukhabad district consists of three tahsils: Farrukhabad, Kaimganj and Amritpur. Amritpur tahsil was created from Rajepur Block after the district was split in 1997. The district has seven blocks: Kaimganj, Nawabganj, Shamsabad, Rajepur, Barhpur, Mohamadabad, and Kamalganj.

Farrukhabad is a historic city with a culture defined by the traditions of Ganga-Jamuni tehzeeb, which amalgamates aspects of Hindu and Muslim cultural practices, rituals, and folk and linguistic traditions.

== History ==
The Bangash leaders of Farrukhabad were Pathan mercenaries who came to Hindustan in the late 17th century, settling in Mau-Rashidabad in the Doab region of North India. After two decades of service amongst the warring rajas of Bundelkhand, Muhammad Khan Bangash entered the Mughal imperial service in 1712 in support of Farrukhsiyar, one of the princely contenders for the Mughal throne, who led a coup which displaced the reigning emperor Jahandar Shah (reigned 1712–1713). With Farrukhsiyar's victory, Mohammad Khan Bangash (c. 1665–1743) was raised to the rank of a commander of 4,000, given assignments on revenue in Bundelkhand to support his troops, and styled Nawab. Like other emergent state-builders, Muhammad Khan proceeded rapidly to found his new city, Farrukhabad, as the centre for his household and those of his 22 sons. The city was begun in 1714, and Mohammad Khan Bangash named it after Farrukhsiyar. It soon became a flourishing centre of commerce and industry.

Bangash also settled in Farrukhabad with his chelas (followers), the 'sons of the state' whom he recruited in great numbers from almost every social source—fellow Pathans, local rajas, Rajputs, Brahmins, Bamtela Thakurs. By the end of Muhammad Khan's life, the number of his chelas seems to have been above 4,000. These favoured young men, whose loyalty seemed more predictable than that of troublesome and ambitious brother Pathans, were entrusted with great responsibilities: in the military, as soldiers, bodyguards, and paymasters; in the household; and even as revenue collectors and deputy governors of provinces. With this formidable apparatus, Muhammad Khan Bangash entered his career as a powerful player in the political upheavals in Delhi following Farrukhsiyar's deposition in 1719.

The Bangash period of Farrukhabad's history is synonymous with the growth of Farrukhabad as an important centre of commerce and fiscal exchange. The Bangash Nawabs encouraged merchants and bankers to come and settle in Farrukhabad. For the promotion of commercial activities, they constructed many bazaars and mahallas (quarters), each devoted to a separate group of artisans or merchants. Along the main route and supply lines numerous ganjes and qasbas were erected to attract trade and credit to Farrukhabad. Very important in this respect was the establishment of the Farrukhabad mint which, apart from being an emblem of sovereignty, stimulated bullion imports and attracted numerous bankers. The superior quality of Farrukhabad currency, both gold and silver, was very well known in the eighteenth century, as it became the most trustworthy and hardest currency of northern India. An anecdote relates that Ahmad Shah Durrani preferred coins made at the Farrukhabad mint. Soon enough, because of its growing reputation as a centre of commerce and finance, Farrukhabad began to attract new immigrants from Afghanistan. The Bangash Nawab sent large sums of money to Kabul and adjoining areas via Lahore in order to invite his countrymen to come to Farrukhabad. Many khanqahs were built, and large sums of cash were distributed in order to entice the ulema, sufis and other intellectuals to settle in Farrukhabad. According to a British intelligence gatherer named Pere Wendel, the reputation of Farrukhabad as a home for holy men during the Bangash period was such that the city became popularly known as "Faquirabad".

The military station of Fatehgarh dates from 1777, although the town did not pass into the possession of the British until 1802. In this period Farrukhabad had fallen under the power of the Wazirs of Awadh and Fatehgarh formed an important outpost against the Maratha war bands. The British brigade lent to the Nawab Wazir was stationed in Fatehgarh in 1777. At the cession of 1802, Fatehgarh became the headquarters of a Governor-General's Agent and of the Board of Commissioners for the Ceded Provinces. Yashwantrao Holkar attacked the fort of Fatehgarh in 1804, but in the famous Battle of Farrukhabad, part of the ongoing Second Anglo-Maratha War, Holkar was defeated and put to flight by the timely arrival of Lord Lake.

In 1818 a gun carriage factory was established in Fatehgarh. From this time, nothing eventful occurred in the history of Fatehgarh until the outbreak of the Rebellion of 1857.

Under the colonial state of British India, Farrukhabad was a nodal centre of the riverine trade through the Ganges river system from North and North-West India towards the East. The story of Farrukhabad's economic and political decline under British rule has to begin with the closure of the famed Farrukhabad mint in 1824. The British policy of centralisation of the Indian economy led to its decision to shut down the mint at Farrukhabad and halt the bullion trade in Farrukhabad. This dealt a heavy blow to the thriving grain trade of the region and precipitated a monetary crisis in the urban and rural areas of the region. The abolition of the mint ruined the native mercantile community and created an acute shortage of money, particularly among poor peasant households. By contrast, Kanpur seems to have benefited from the decline of Farrukhabad and emerged as a major commercial centre during this period of depression lasting till the end of the 1840s.

During the days of the Sepoy Mutiny, nearly the entire population of Europeans in Fatehgarh, upwards of 200 in number, was killed by the rebels. A few succeeded in escaping from Fatehgarh and managed to reach Kanpur, only to be seized by Nana Sahib and massacred. Those who remained behind, after sustaining a siege of upwards of a week, were forced to abandon the fort, which had been undermined by the rebels, and to betake themselves to the Ganges. On their way down the river, they were attacked by the rebels and villagers on both sides of the river. One of the boats with the Europeans managed to reach Bithur, where it was captured; the travellers were taken to Kanpur, and subsequently massacred. Another boat grounded in the river the day after leaving Fatehgarh, and the passengers were shot down or drowned in their attempt to reach land. Some captured Europeans were brought back to Fatehgarh, and after being kept in confinement for nearly three weeks, were shot or sabered on the parade ground. Their remains were cast into a well, over which was built a memorial cross, with a memorial church near to it.

The main sources of information for the events that unfolded during the stormy days of the Mutiny are the British state accounts and first person reports by Europeans who were posted in different parts of India in that year. We find that the news of the outbreak of Mutiny in Meerut reached Fatehgarh on 14 May 1857; and another week brought tidings of its spread to Aligarh. British imperial gazetteer records that the 10th Native Infantry posted at Fatehgarh showed symptoms of a mutinous spirit on 29 May. It was not until 3 June that a body of insurgents from Awadh crossed the Ganges, and arranged for a rising on the following day. The European officials and residents abandoned Fatehgarh the same evening, but several of them returned to Fatehgarh a few days later and remained till the 18th, when another outbreak occurred and the rebels placed the Bangash Nawab of Farrukhabad on the throne. The Europeans had called for additional troops from Sitapur to reinforce their control of the fort of Fatehgarh. On 25 June, the rebels attacked the European positions, forcing them to flee.

The Bangash Nawab continued to rule Farrukhabad till 23 October 1857, when he was defeated by the British at Kannuaj. The British forces went on to quell the rebellion in other parts of Rohilkhand. On 2 January 1858, the British forces were once again at the doors of Fatehgarh, crossed the Kali Nadi and recaptured the fort of Fatehgarh the next day. The Nawab and his small entourage fled to Bareilly. In May 1858, a force of 3,000 insurgents from Bundelkhand crossed into the district and captured Kaimganj. The British forces successfully drove them out into the last rebel refuge, in Awadh, and the British order was never again disturbed in Fatehgarh.

== Demographics ==
Historical population
Year	Pop.	±% p.a.
1901	493,642	—
1911	479,956	−0.28%
1921	456,824	−0.49%
1931	477,369	+0.44%
1941	519,387	+0.85%
1951	593,888	+1.35%
1961	704,476	+1.72%
1971	829,697	+1.65%
1981	1,031,970	+2.21%
1991	1,284,419	+2.21%
2001	1,570,408	+2.03%
2011	1,885,204	+1.84%

Religions in Farrukhabad district (2011)
Religion	Percent
Hinduism	84.67%
Islam	14.69%
Other or not stated	0.64%
Distribution of religions

According to the 2011 census Farrukhabad district has a population of 1,885,204, roughly equal to the nation of Lesotho or the US state of West Virginia. This gives it a ranking of 250th in India (out of a total of 707). The district has a population density of 865 inhabitants per square kilometre (2,240/sq mi). Its population growth rate over the decade 2001–2011 was 20.2%. Farrukhabad has a sex ratio of 880 females for every 1000 males, and a literacy rate of 69.04%. 22.08% of the population lived in urban areas. Scheduled Castes make up 16.59% of the population.

Languages of Farrukhabad district (2011)
1. Hindi (95.0%)
2. Urdu (4.68%)
3. Others (0.36%)

At the time of the 2011 Census of India, 94.96% of the population in the district spoke Hindi (or a related language) and 4.68% Urdu as their first language.

== Government and politics ==
=== District administration ===
As of January 2026, Ashutosh Kumar Dwivedi is the district magistrate. Arti Singh is the superintendent of police. Neeraj Kumar is the district judge.

=== Twin towns: Farrukhabad and Fatehgarh ===
The district is called Farrukhabad and its headquarters is located at Fatehgarh. Fatehgarh derives its name from an old fort on the bank of the river Ganges. The fort presently falls in the Fatehgarh cantonment area and serves as the headquarter of the Rajput Regiment stationed at Fatehgarh Cantonment. The two cities are separated by a distance of 5 km and in the present times, with an increase in population, have merged into a single urban expanse. The district with a total area of 228,830 hectares consists of three tahsils, seven development block, 580 gram panchayats, 1020 villages, 15 police stations, 2 nagar palikas (Municipal Committees) and seven nagar panchayats (Town Area committee) and one Cantonment Board.

== Economy ==
In 2006 the Ministry of Panchayati Raj named Farrukhabad one of the country's 250 most backward districts (out of a total of 640). It is one of the 34 districts in Uttar Pradesh currently receiving funds from the Backward Regions Grant Fund Programme (BRGF). Industrial development in the Farrukhabad district has been lethargic. This is despite the fact that Farrukhabad has been famous for its cloth printing and zardozi embroidery work. Zardosi remains Farrukhabad's primary industry spread across the city and its rural periphery. Approximately 175,000 trained handicraftsmen are engaged in this industry, and around 360 zardosi units are registered in the district. Zardosi embroidery from Farrukhabad is exported to many international markets in Europe, North America and Middle Eastern countries. In recent years, the Textile Ministry of India in collaboration with the state government of Uttar Pradesh, has proposed the setting up of a 'textile park' in Farrukhabad to promote local textile industry and create job opportunities for the local youth. Farrukhabad is registered for its famous 'Farrukhabad Prints' under the Handicraft category of geographical indication registry (GI tags). Source

=== Agriculture ===
The area under cultivation in Farrukhabad is 148,000 hectares (370,000 acres) with cropping intensity of 145% and 86% of net cultivated area being irrigated. Farrukhabad is a leading producer of potatoes in India and a significant producer of wheat, paddy, mustard, sunflower, maize, sugarcane. tobacco, vegetables and fruits. The percentages of net cropped area under various crops during kharif season are rice (11%), maize (27%), millets (4%), pulses (4%), tobacco (5%) and vegetables (10%). The percentages of net cropped area under different crops during rabi season are wheat (48%), potato (20%), vegetables (12%) and other crops (20%). There are about 61 cold storage facilities in Farrukhabad district catering to the potato storage needs of the district. Farrukhabad is located in the fertile Ganges river plains and the river plays an important role in the irrigation system of the district. Most of the regions in district are capable of producing three crops per year with an extremely high acreage yield. The administrative division (tahsil) of Kaimganj, about 25 km from Farrukhabad, is a noted producer of mangoes, guavas and many other fruits. Tobacco cultivation is another important agricultural activity of the region. Kaimganj is a centre of chewing tobacco industry. There is one sugar mill in Kaimganj as well. In recent years, some small scale agro-industries which include rice plants and oil mills have been set up in the district.

=== Investment opportunities ===
In June 2014, in a report produced by IBRD/World Bank, Farrukhabad was ranked 18th (out of 70 districts) in High Economic Potential Index of districts in Uttar Pradesh with EPI score of 2013 (mean EPI score was 1858). This score was above the score of districts such as Varanasi (2001.8), Allahabad (1996.9), Mathura (1978.9), Agra (1943), Gorakhpur (1770.6), Jhansi (1506.8), etc. This report is based on the following parameters: Market accessibility, Industrial diversity, Commodity flow, Per capita industrial investment, Specialization in agriculture, and Social conditions.

Comparison with neighbouring districts
District	EPI Score
Lucknow (Capital of Uttar Pradesh)	2338.04
Kannauj	2209.97
Etah	2017.15
Mainpuri	2016.00
Farrukhabad	2013.65
Etawah	1965.51
Badaun	1960.76
Bareilly	1909.74
Hardoi	1855.84
Shahjahanpur	1811.67

== Places of interest ==
=== Fatehgarh Cantonment ===
The Fatehgarh Cantonment dates from 1777 and is situated near the river Ganges. It houses three regiments, namely Rajput Regiment, Sikh Light Infantry and Territorial Army. From British colonial times, Fatehgarh has remained a military station of considerable importance.

=== Shamsabad ===
Shamsabad is a historical town of Farrukhabad district in Uttar Pradesh which is established in early ninth century much before the establishment of Farrukhabad by the then king Khor. In 12th century It was captured by the army of Shams al-Din [Iltutmish] of the Delhi Sultanate in 1212 AD. Thereafter, the town was renamed after the reigning Sultan of Delhi and came to called Shamsabad. It has one railway station in Manjhana village.

=== Kaimganj ===
Kaimganj is a town in Farrukhabad district. Kaimganj is the birthplace of Zakir Hussain who was the third President of India from 13 May 1967 until his death on 3 May 1969, and the founder of Jamia Milia Islamia. It is also the birthplace of eminent linguist, Professor Emeritus Masud Husain Khan, the Pakistani Army's General Rahimuddin Khan, who was also Balochistan's longest-serving governor, Gulam Rabbani Khan Taban, a well-known poet and Syed Abdul Salam Shah, an Indian politician belonging to the Indian National Congress (INC), and a well-known freedom fighter. Pandit Puttu Lal Dubey was born at Kindar Nagla Tyor Khas in Kaimganj. He was the "Sirpunch" of Tyor Khas Gram Sabha. He was also a freedom fighter. His family lives in Kindar Nagla Kaimganj.. Also, the tomb of Nawab Rashid Khan is located there.

=== Kampil ===
The town Kampil is situated in the district of Farrukhabad, tahsil of Kaimganj, about 45 km north-west of Fatehgarh. Kampil is a typical agricultural village of the Gangetic plains, in the fertile territory of the Doab between the Ganges and Yamuna rivers. The present of Kampil conceals a deep interest in its past.

Alexander Cunningham, the founder of the Archaeological Survey of India, in his capacity as the chief archaeological surveyor of the British colonial state in the 1860s and 70s, visited Kampil for the first time in March 1878 and identified it with Kampilya, the capital of the ancient kingdom of South Panchala. In his record of the visit, Cunningham writes that the most eastward mound at the site was shown to him as corresponding to the site of King Drupad's palace.

Eighty years later Kampil was once again the object of archaeologists' attention. It appeared both in the list of sites with Painted Grey Ware (PGW) and in the one with Northern Black Polished Ware (NBPW) drawn up by B.B. Lal in 1954–55. The first official survey of Kampil dates back to 1961. It was carried out by V.N. Mishra of the Poona Deccan College Post-Graduate and Research Institute. He confirmed the identity of the present village with Kampilya. These observations made on the basis of the data obtained from investigations and official excavations are very sketchy, however, and the description of the archaeological remains visible on the surface are lacking in documentation. From S.B. Singh and Meenu Gupta we learn that the terracotta figurines found at the time may be ascribed to a period between the 2nd century BC and 1st century AD. At Kampil, numerous architectonic stone remains can also be seen such as door-posts, architraves, etc., either engraved and decorated or simply squared, which can be attributed to the 8th–10th century AD. The state museum of Lucknow preserves some of the most significant stone sculptures, damaged to varying degrees, and terracotta figurines found at the site of Kampil.

Data gathered up to now on the history of Kampil, and, in particular, the results of the excavation carried out in 1976, indicate the beginning of a settlement in the place no earlier than the 7th century BC. These findings deny the hypothesis put forward by Alexander Cunningham. Ancient literature dates Kampilya farther back in time and gives it an importance and a royal dignity which clearly contrasts with the results of the excavation of 1976. Limited archaeological research carried out at Kampil up to now cannot be considered definitive, therefore the identity of Kampil = Kampilya has still to be proved.

Besides being a prosperous town, Kampilya was also an important Jaina and Buddhist religious centre. Tradition recognises the town as the birthplace of the thirteenth tirthankara Vimalanatha. The religious importance of Kampilya was no less a measure of its reputation as a centre of trade and commerce. It has been suggested that Kampilya could have been the site of a strategic ford to go across the river Ganges. To further underline the importance of the town, moreover, there is evidence of its connection with the most important inhabited centres of the period. "The Grand Route" stretched from Taxila to Vaishali and farther, and at Panipat split into two branches: the southern route also went through Kampilya. It has also been pointed out that Kampilya lay on a route mentioned in the Satapatha Brahmana.

=== Sankassa / Sankisa ===
Sankisa is located about 47 km from Farrukhabad. Every year in the month of Vaisakha (May), on the occasion of Buddha's birth-anniversary, a large fair is held at Sankissa. Tourists from all over the world, particularly from Sri Lanka, Vietnam, Myanmar, Korea and Japan visit Sankisa. Situated close to the river Kali, Sankisa appears to be a circular, fortified site with deep historical significance. In Buddhist religious canon, Sankisa is regarded as the site where the Buddha came down a ladder from the 'thirty-third heavens' of Buddhist legends, accompanied by Indra and Brahma. The historical significance of Sankisa is bolstered by the find of an Ashokan capital, still found at the site near the highest still existing mound locally known as Bisai or Bisari Devi. In his study of the site Alexander Cunningham had also recorded the Buddhist artefacts found in a nearby village called Pakna Bihar, a few kilometres east of Sankisa. He found an inscription from the Kushan period, a few railing fragments with lotus medallions, and some period images of Buddhist and Vedic culture. Many Buddhist sealings of the Gupta and post-Gupta period were also found. On the basis of these material findings, Cunningham concluded that a monastery and stupa must have existed at the site. In an essay on the ancient historical geography of the Ganga plain, its authors make the following observation about Sankisa: "Our assumption is that Sankisa was the most important administrative centre of the Central Doab in the second half of the first millennium B.C. and later. In terms of communication, it was advantageously located. The villagers of Sankisa point to the ferry crossing on the kali Nadi, with the road beyond it leading to Mainpuri and from there to the Agra and Mathura region. It is also easy to move in the other direction towards Kanauj and beyond. Sankisa offers an easy access, through Etawah where Chakranagar is located, to the trans-Chambal region of central India. The importance of Sankisa seems to be related to its strategic location at this intersection of routes. Sankisa is part of the Uttar Pradesh state government's ambitious Buddhist Circuit to promote tourism in the state.Source This connects S3 & K3 (Sarnath, Sankisa, Sravasti, Kapilvastu, Kaushambi, and Kushinagar).

== Arts and culture ==
=== Food ===
Potato is the staple of the Farrukhabadi diet as Farrukhabad produces more than 50 varieties of potatoes and is the largest supplier of potato in the country. The most popular street food of Farrukhabad is the papadi or papadiya, a snack enjoyed by the locals of the region. Another popular delicacy is the 'bhunje aloo' or roasted potatoes. A winter street food, it involves roasting newly dug out batches of potatoes in a bed of sand heated in a huge cauldron over wood logs or cow dung cakes. The roasted potatoes are served with coriander and green chilli chutney and locally made spice mix. Besides, aloo tikki chaat and golgappe are consumed by the local people.

=== Music ===
Farrukhabad gharana is one of the six prominent playing styles or gharanas of North Indian tabla drums in Hindustani classical music. The Farrukhabad gharana is known for its use of the entire vocabulary of the instrument and high tonal quality. These have become the definitive attributes of the Farrukhabadi style, also called the 'khula baaj' or open/resonant style. Founded by Ustad Haji Vilayat Ali Khan, this school has produced some of the greatest tabla players of our time, like Ustad Ahmed Jan Thirakwa, Ustad Habibuddin Khansaheb and Ustad Amir Hussain Khansaheb.

Listen to the table maestros of the Farrukhabad gharana blend different styles: https://scroll.in/article/822465/listen-tabla-maestros-of-the-farrukhabad-gharana-seamlessly-blend-styles

Before the rebellion of 1857, the tabla players of the Farrukhabad gharana were affiliated with the royal court of the Nawabs of Awadh at Lucknow. Following the sepoy mutiny in 1857, the locus of arts and culture moved to Rampur from Lucknow which ultimately emerged as the leading center of classical music in North India. Rampur maintained this distinction until 1949 when it became part of unified India, at which time the courts were abolished. The royal court of Rampur under the Nawab Hamid Ali Khan (1899–1930) was known for its patronage to musicians and artists. It was during the reign of Hamid Ali Khan that the tabla players of Farrukhabad became permanently established at Rampur. It appears that Nawab Raza Ali Khan who succeeded Nawab Hamid Ali Khan could not extend patronage to artists and musicians like his predecessor. As a result, many of the court musicians and dancer left Rampur. The Farrukhabad tabla players were among these. In 1936, Masit Khan, the head of the Gharana, moved to Calcutta with his entire family and this city has since remained the center of the Farrukhabad tradition. A documentary 'Doyen of Farrukhabad' was released in 2015, directed by Nitin Mahadar, and hosted by Tom Alter. This documentary is on legendary Tabla Maestro Ustad Amir Hussain Khan of Farrukhabad Gharana.

== Transportation ==
=== Highways ===
There are two state highways and one national highway that connect the district to other parts of Uttar Pradesh.

1. UP – NH 730C (Lipu Lake-Pilibhit-Shahjahanpur-Fatehgarh-Etawah)
2. UP – SH-29A (Fatehgarh-Gursahaiganj)
3. UP – SH-43 (Farrukhabad-Moradabad)

=== Railways ===
Farrukhabad district is served by two railway stations – Farrukhabad Junction and Fatehgarh. The stations fall in the Izzatnagar division of North Eastern Railway with its headquarters at [Gorakhpur] in Eastern Uttar Pradesh. Both stations fall on the Kanpur-Mathura broad gauge section. A branch line opened in 1906 connects Farrukhabad to Shikohabad on the Howrah–Delhi main line.

=== Air ===
Farrukhabad has an airstrip at Mohammadabad under the control of the Airports Authority of India which is occasionally used by small aircraft and helicopters.

== Education ==
Farrukhabad was a major centre of Indo-Islamic learning during the Mughal period. Scholars from all over the Islamic world, from as far away as Iran, Central Asia and Arabia travelled to Farrukhabad to learn Persian, Urdu and Arabic with famous teachers of the city. By the 19th century.

== Literature ==
Farrukhabad had emerged as an important centre of Hindi literature with notable personalities such as Mahadevi Verma representing the cultural and social ethos of the region. Anwar Farrukhabadi – Indian Sufi poet. His ghazal "Yeh jo halka halka suroor hai" has been rendered by various artists including Nusrat Fateh Ali Khan. Well known Hindi poet Shivom Amber is from Farrukhabad. Dr. S.G. (Shantanu Gopal) Mukherjee was a pioneering homeopathic practitioner who compiled and published the first comprehensive Homoeopathic Materia Medica in Hindi in May 1926. Animesh Mukharjee, a Farrukhabad-born author, is known for his bestselling books Thakurbadi and Itihas Ki Thali.

== Notable people ==
- Muhammad Khan Bangash (1665–1743) – Mughal military servant and founder of the city of Farrukhabad
- Ramesh Chandra (1939–) – founder of Unitech Group (a real estate company).
- Anwar Farrukhabadi (1928 – 2011) – Indian Sufi poet. His ghazal "Yeh jo halka halka suroor hai" has been rendered by various artists including Nusrat Fateh Ali Khan.
- Anna Martha Fullerton (1853–1938) – physician, medical educator, established Fullerton Memorial Hospital for Women and Children in 1907.
- George Stuart Fullerton (1859–1925) – Philosopher, Psychologist, Professor of Philosophy at Columbia University.
- Zakir Husain (1897–1969) – The third President of India and Bharat Ratna
- Khurshed Alam Khan (1919–2013) – Indian politician, former Governor of Karnataka & Goa, Member of Parliament (both Lok Sabha and Rajya Sabha), Member of the Union Council of ministers, and has handled various portfolios, namely, External Affairs, Tourism, Civil Aviation, Textiles, and Commerce.
- Renu Khator – Eighth Chancellor of the University of Houston System, USA
- Salman Khurshid (1953–) – Indian politician, advocate, author, former Minister of External Affairs, Law and Justice, Minority Affairs of India.
- Mriganka Sur – Newton Professor of Neuroscience, Head of Brain and Cognitive Sciences, and Director of the Simons Initiative on Autism and the Brain at Massachusetts Institute of Technology, USA
- Mahadevi Varma (1907–1987) – Hindi poet and educationist; recipient of the Jnanpith Award in 1982 for her service to Hindi literature.
