= Lightner Witmer =

American psychologist

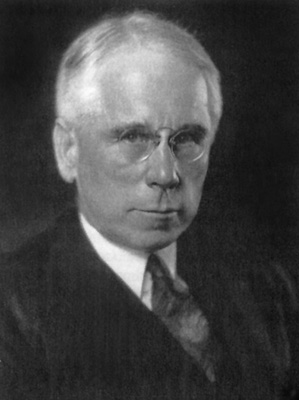
- Lightner Witmer
- Born: David L. Witmer Jr. June 28, 1867; Philadelphia, Pennsylvania, U.S.
- Died: July 19, 1956 (aged 89); Bryn Mawr, Pennsylvania, U.S.
- Education: University of Pennsylvania
- Scientific career
- Fields: clinical psychology, child psychology, educational psychology

Lightner Witmer (June 28, 1867 – July 19, 1956) was an American psychologist. He introduced the term "clinical psychology" and is often credited with founding the field that it describes. Witmer created the world's first "psychological clinic" at the University of Pennsylvania in 1896, including the first journal of clinical psychology and the first clinical hospital school in 1907.

Witmer contributed to numerous branches of psychology including school psychology. He contributed to the field of special education.

Little is known about Witmer's life. He is described as an introverted and private person.

== Early life ==
Witmer was born in Philadelphia on June 28, 1867. His birth name was David L. Witmer Jr., but he changed it to Lightner at age 50. His parents were devout Catholics: his father, David Witmer, a Germantown, Philadelphia, pharmacist who graduated from a Philadelphia college in 1862, and his mother, Katherine Huchel, about whom little is known. He was the eldest of four children, followed by Albert Ferree, Lilly Evelyn, and Paul DeLancey. Later in life, Witmer became a faculty member at the University of Pennsylvania. Ferree earned his doctorate in physiology from the University of Pennsylvania, Lilly Evelyn received her bacteriology medical degree in Berlin, and Paul DeLancey earned a doctoral degree in pharmacy. By the end of 1905, Witmer and his siblings had all become doctors in a range of disciplines.

== Education ==
As a young man, Witmer wanted a better future and a better world after the social problems he saw as a result of the American Civil War. In 1880, Witmer and his brother Ferree enrolled in the Episcopal Academy of Philadelphia, a preparatory school and one of the best schools in America at the time.

Witmer showed his intelligence and reasoning ability at prep school. Witmer and two other boys were told to build a canoe, each having everything they needed to complete their task. His two schoolmates were arguing over who would build the canoe first, but Witmer thought and told the other children, "I wish to finish last as I will learn from others' mistakes and build the best canoe."

He graduated with high honors at age 17. In 1884, Witmer enrolled at the University of Pennsylvania to study art, but after a couple of years he transferred to the Finance and Economy Department, from which he obtained a bachelor's degree in 1888 (aged 20). During his first year, he was chosen as the class president and earned a reputation as an outstanding student. After a stint as a teacher, Witmer decided to return to the University of Pennsylvania for his graduate studies in political science.

== Rugby Academy ==
During the fall of 1888, Witmer was offered a job as an instructor at Rugby Academy, a male secondary school. He taught history and English.

While he was teaching at the academy, Witmer noticed that a 14-year-old student who wished to attend college had extreme difficulty distinguishing between sounds, as well as other speech problems that might today be called dyslexia. Witmer decided to help him correct his problem; the child progressed satisfactorily and was able to continue studying, eventually enrolling at the University of Pennsylvania. This success made Witmer believe that children with learning difficulties could satisfactorily engage in education with support, dedication, and special education.

The following year, Witmer decided to attend graduate school at the University of Pennsylvania and was accepted into the Philosophy Department. He intended to study law and to work towards an advanced degree in political science.

== Career ==
=== James McKeen Cattell and the Experimental Psychological Lab ===
While at UPenn, Witmer was introduced to experimental psychologist James McKeen Cattell, who inspired him to begin studying in the emerging field of psychology. George Stuart Fullerton, a faculty member of the university, brought Cattell to join the faculty. At the time, Cattell was known as one of the best-trained psychologists, educated by the influential psychologist Wilhelm Maximilian Wundt. Witmer accepted Fullerton's offer to become Cattell's assistant. He decided to resign from the Rugby Academy and attend graduate school at UPenn.

Witmer and Cattell worked together to found an experimental psychology laboratory to study individual differences by examining a range of subjects. Witmer's main lab tasks were to gather data on individual differences in reaction times. Through these, he gained knowledge of psychological experiments. While at the lab, Witmer published a manual that explained how experimental psychology should be properly conducted. Witmer intended to get his doctoral degree under Cattell's supervision, but Cattell suddenly left the university—effectively abandoning his students and laboratory—to obtain a higher-paying position at Columbia University. Witmer also left in search of a new teacher.

=== Under Wundt's Supervision ===
Cattell helped Witmer to get a job as an assistant to Wilhelm Wundt at Leipzig University in 1891; Witmer also took classes with Oswald Külpe and Ludwig Strümpell. Historians have found no letters he wrote to colleagues while under Wundt's supervision. However, it is said that while Witmer was Wundt's assistant, they had several disagreements. One of those disputes was that Witmer desired to continue working on the study of reaction times he had previously started with Cattell, but Wundt insisted that they should study the aesthetic value of different visual forms, and other branches of psychology, such as educational psychology and developmental psychology. Witmer obtained his PhD in 1892 from Wundt.

=== Return to Pennsylvania ===
In 1892, Witmer left Germany and returned to the University of Pennsylvania, becoming the director of the laboratory of psychology. He was interested in teaching child psychology and taught several different courses. He also began researching individual differences in sensory-perceptual variables and presented papers in experimental psychology. In 1896, he taught public school teachers at the university. During March of that year, Margaret Maguire, a Philadelphia public-school teacher, brought a special case before Witmer: a fourteen-year-old student who was having extreme difficulties learning to spell, yet was quite able and excelled in other subjects. This case offered a special challenge to Witmer and was in line with his developing view that psychology should be of practical benefit. He soon began remedial work with the youth. Needing a workspace, Witmer established the first psychological clinic at the university. In 1896, he presented a plan of organization for practical work in psychology to the American Psychological Association, in which he first used and defined the term "clinical psychology". Witmer was elected to the American Philosophical Society in 1897.

In 1902, he started advising graduate students and published a laboratory manual. He married Emma Repplier, a prominent graduate from the Agnes Irwin School, in 1904. She was a writer who worked for the American Philosophical Society, to which both she and Witmer belonged. In 1908, he established and staffed a small, private residential school near Wallingford, Pennsylvania, an institution dedicated to the care and treatment of the developmentally disabled and children with what are now recognized as emotional and behavioral disorders. Later, he established a similar, but larger facility in Devon, Pennsylvania. He founded the world's first speech clinic in 1914.

== American Psychological Association ==
By 1896, Witmer, Stanley Hall, William James, and James McKeen Cattell decided to create a new association for psychology professionals during a meeting of the American Psychological Association (APA). Witmer and other experimental colleagues proposed that the APA should accept only psychological papers, be separated from the American Philosophical Association, and have a better selection process for choosing new members. These proposals sparked a debate among APA members because many of the current members did not want the field to separate from philosophy. Their proposals were rejected, so Witmer attempted to start an association with Hall, exclusively for experimental psychologists, but Hall refused. In 1904, Edward B. Titchener accepted Witmer's proposal to separate psychology from philosophy and decided to abandon the APA and help Witmer create a society solely for experimental psychologists, the Society of Experimental Psychologists (SEP).

Witmer told Titchener that the association should be only for men and that women should be excluded because they were too emotional when discussing scientific issues. He eventually changed his attitude and decided to teach female students; he accepted women to work at his clinic and later appointed a woman to manage it.

Witmer wrote and published articles for the APA. In one article, "The Organization of Practical Work in Psychology", he expressed his desire to assist children academically and described a plan for organized education. He proposed that schools should become more involved with their students' classes and grades, that schools should have better educational tools, and that faculty members should receive teaching reflecting psychological findings.

== First psychological clinic ==
Witmer opened the first psychological clinic at the University of Pennsylvania in 1896 to study children with learning or behavioral challenges. Witmer's main participants were children who attended public schools in Philadelphia and the surrounding areas and were brought to the clinic by their teachers or parents. Witmer's clinic was appreciated by many because it proactively applied psychology. In the clinic, Witmer regularly dealt with issues such as speech difficulties, sleep disturbances, behavioral problems, hyperactivity, and refusal to stay in school. Every child was given a complete mental and physical examination, which often ruled out physiological symptoms. His method of aiding children with psychological problems involved breaking down information to a level that they could understand. He would focus on specific problems and work with the child in those areas, often improving several areas at once.

In 1907, Witmer founded the journal The Psychological Clinic. In its first issue, he published the article "Clinical Psychology", which explained its definition in the following way:

Although clinical psychology is clearly related to medicine, it is quite as closely related to sociology and pedagogy... An abundance of material for scientific study fails to be utilized, because the interest of psychologists is elsewhere engaged, and those in constant touch with the actual phenomena do not possess the training necessary to make the experience and observation of scientific value...I have borrowed the word "clinical" from medicine because it is the term I can find to indicate the character of the method which I deem necessary for this work.

Witmer's "Clinical Psychology" was published and received a lot of attention because it focused on the study of individual children. In his article, Witmer presented the idea that all kinds of children (smart or intellectually disabled) could reach their full potential with help. He included definitions of retardation using two different terms: "physiological retardation" referred to individuals who had not acquired a normal development for their chronological ages, whereas the other term, "pedagogical retardation", referred to children who did not develop their full capacities when they reached adulthood.

In the first issue of The Psychological Clinic, he criticized some of his colleagues and their departments because they had rejected ideas he proposed to the American Psychological Association. In 1908, in a later issue of his journal, he criticized William James for what he felt was his unscientific attitude, calling James "the spoiled child of American Psychology".

Witmer always defended his ideas and beliefs, even if it seemed that he did not care about other points of view. This and other disagreements caused Witmer to lose the friendship of his colleagues, who decided not to attend Witmer's meetings.

Witmer also attacked Harvard University for using the theory of introspection and teaching psychology incorrectly, since Witmer also refused the theory of introspection and did not care much for pure experimental psychology. He also criticized "intelligence tests" and encouraged his students not to trust them, because he thought those tests only gave a measure of the individual's efficiency, nothing else. He thought that people should not be referred to as normal or abnormal due to the results of such tests, as one could then say that an individual was "normal" or "abnormal", depending on whether, for example, they knew how to write and read properly.

Witmer studied monkeys and a chimpanzee, Peter, trained for theatre performance. He compared them using tests he used on children. He investigated Peter's ability to vocalise and found he could only say "mamma," though he doubted whether the "a" vowel was properly pronounced. He found Peter could string beads, light and smoke cigarettes, unlock padlocks with keys, hammer nails, turn on taps, and write the letter "W" with chalk on a blackboard.

Witmer's studies of individual behavior extended to gifted children. In 1900, in his The Restoration of Children of the Slums, Witmer stated that criminal behavior was not hereditary. Instead, he thought criminal behavior was caused due to environmental exposures.

In 1911, Witmer supported a bill in the state of Pennsylvania to sterilize severely developmentally disabled people to minimize their reproduction. In 1912, he traveled to Italy to study pedagogical methods with special children.

== Clinical psychology ==
In his 1896 APA paper, cited to be the first instance of his use and explanation of the term "Clinical Psychology," Witmer outlined four main goals for his new discipline. Firstly, it was to focus on the investigation of mental and intellectual disability using statistical and clinical methods. Secondly, clinical psychology as a discipline was to establish more psychological clinics and hospitals specifically for children suffering from intellectual disability or physical defects that impact academic progress. The discipline was to focus on providing opportunities for those in other disciplines, such as teaching, medicine and social work to observe and work with children with intellectual disability and normal children. Witmer's fourth goal was to train more psychologists to become experts in working with mentally and/or morally intellectually disabled clients. In this same paper, Witmer outlined the main concern of clinical psychology: that the discipline focus on active clinical intervention for the purpose of the restoration and treatment of mentally or intellectually disabled individuals. According to Witmer, for clinical psychology to actually be of any worth, it needed to help and improve clients' mental health and well-being.

As clinical psychology was the first discipline in psychology that attempted to apply the principles of scientific psychology to diagnostic and therapeutic treatment, it required its own techniques and procedures. Clinical psychology's original methodologies were highly practical and problem-oriented and were developed solely by Witmer. His early work used a hands-on approach to observation and interviews, emphasizing one-on-one interaction between the client and the clinician.

Additionally, emphasis was placed on the ability of the clinician to be able to work with their clients in a professional, yet personal way. Witmer highlighted the concept of treating each client as an individual, and not simply as a physical manifestation of their problem or a phenomenon to be observed and explained. He emphasized examining each client's personal background history, as he believes it would allow clinicians to better and more fully understand their situation. He was one of the first psychologists to recognize that a client's problems could have environmental as well as hereditary factors, and because of this, he emphasized the importance that treatment should not end with returning the client into the environment from which their physical, mental, or moral problem originated unless something had been done to change it.

Although the treatment programs Witmer created for clinical psychology were systematic, they were constantly revised and implemented new treatment methods as the client improved or problems arose. Treatment involved weekly visits to the clinic and would continue until either the problem was resolved, or the client, or the client's parent/guardian, decided to end it. Witmer's treatment programs were not limited to the clinic in which they took place; he emphasized the importance of ongoing remediation both in between treatment sessions and after treatment had officially ended. To this end Witmer made a point to provide direct advice and consultation to both the client and their caregivers on their living environment and other aspects of their lives in order to improve their problems or disabilities. Many of Witmer's original approaches still exist in modern-day clinical psychology.

== Other contributions ==
Witmer was responsible for major advancements in the field of school psychology and was cited as the founder of this discipline. Witmer was the first psychologist to undertake and focus on the treatment of those with mental, physical or moral handicaps with the goal of improving their lives. He ensured that the treatment of children suffering from a deficit impairing their academic success would be a major focus of clinical psychology when he made one of the discipline's main goals the creation of psychological clinics and hospitals to treat impaired children.

Witmer was the first psychologist to realize teachers' integral role and began offering classes at his clinic for teachers. He opened up his clinic to those in medicine and social work and gave them the opportunity to observe and work with normal and impaired children. This allowed those who interacted with children a chance to work with them in a therapeutic environment. By mixing developmentally typical children with those with disabilities, Witmer gave professional educators the chance to directly observe the differences between the two groups for themselves. He offered these professionals courses that demonstrated how to practically apply his clinical methods. This helped the other disciplines to see the importance of working with disabled children.

Final days

By 1917, Witmer joined the Red Cross. His main task was to help to rehabilitate homeless people who were war victims. When he went to the United States in 1920, his mother died, followed a few years later by Titchener, and he stopped publishing.

By 1930, the University of Pennsylvania presented him with a volume called Clinical Psychology: Studies in Honor of Lightner Witmer.

On July 19, 1956, at age 89, Witmer died at the hospital in Bryn Mawr from heart failure.

== Legacy ==
Witmer gained little recognition outside of clinical psychology and is little talked about. Several factors are claimed to have contributed to this perception.

One had to do with Witmer's personality. Within his field he was vicious, argumentative and blunt, regardless of his opponent. Witmer's targets included the American Psychological Association, non-experimentalists, psychology as a discipline, and his colleagues.

A second factor was that many of his theories were not empirically testable. Although Witmer was a major advocate for scientific procedures, he often presented his theories as facts, rather than hypotheses. He then often failed to provide methods for testing his theories.

Many of his principles, methods and ideas are basically congruent with later developments in his field, but were far from the mainstream when he offered them. At his official address in 1897, his ideas for clinical psychology produced only a few raised eyebrows.

Witmer was highly critical of many popular trends in psychology and society during his career. For example, he directly opposed popular education methods of his time, which focused on mass instruction. Witmer argued that education required personalization and a focus on students as individuals. He was highly critical of intelligence tests, which he claimed measured efficiency, rather than intelligence. He saw intelligence as having both hereditary and environmental components.

== Works ==
- The Association Value of Three-Place Consonant Syllables. Journal of Genetic Psychology 47 (1935): 337-360.
- Are We Educating the Rising Generation?” Education Review. 37 (1909): 456-467.
- Children with mental Defects Distinguished from Mentally Defective Children.” Psychological Clinic. 7 (1913): 173-181.
- Clinical Psychology.” Psychological Clinic. 1 (1907): 1-9.
- Courses in Psychology for Normal Schools. Education Review 13 (1897): 45-57, 146-162.
- The Exceptional Child and the Training of Teachers for Exceptional Children. School & Society. 2 (1915): 217-229.
- Experimental Psychology and the Psych-physical Laboratory. University Extension (1894): 230-238.
- Intelligence—A Definition.” Psychological Clinic. 14 (1922): 65-67.
- Performance and Success: An Outline of Psychology for Diagnostic Testing and Teaching. Psychological Clinic 12 (1919): 145-170.
- The Problem of Educability. Psychological Clinic 12 (1919): 174-178.
- The Raining of Very Bright Children. Psychological Clinic 13 (1919): 88-96.
- The Nearing Case: The Limitation of Academic Freedom at the University of Pennsylvania by Act of the Board of Trustees, New York: B. W. Huebsch, 1915.
- What Is Intelligence, and Who Has It? Scientific Monthly 15 (1922): 57-67.
