= Amritpur, Uttar Pradesh =

Amritpur, Uttar Pradesh Amritpur
- Tehsil
- Location in Uttar Pradesh, India Amritpur, Uttar Pradesh (India)
- Coordinates: 27.55°N 79.35°E
- Country: India
- State: Uttar Pradesh
- District: Farrukhabad
- Elevation: 136 m (446 ft)

Population (2001)
  - Total: 83,773

Languages
  - Official: Hindi
- Time zone: UTC+5:30 (IST)
- PIN: 209622
- Vehicle registration: UP 76
- Website: farrukhabad.nic.in

Amritpur is a prominent town and one of three tehsils in Farrukhabad district of Uttar Pradesh state in northern India. The other two tehsils are Farrukhabad and Kaimganj. Amritpur tehsil was created from Rajepur Block after the district was split in 1997.

== Transport ==
The nearest railway stations are at Farrukhabad and Fatehgarh. The nearest airport is Amausi Airport.

== Geography ==
Amritpur is located at 27.33°N 79.35°E. It has an average elevation of 136 metres (449 feet). The town has an alluvial fertile soil. Farming activities take place the year round. Sugercane, potato and other vegetables are produced in the area. The average annual rainfall is around 25 cm.
