= Sankissa =

Historical city in India

- Uttar Pradesh, India
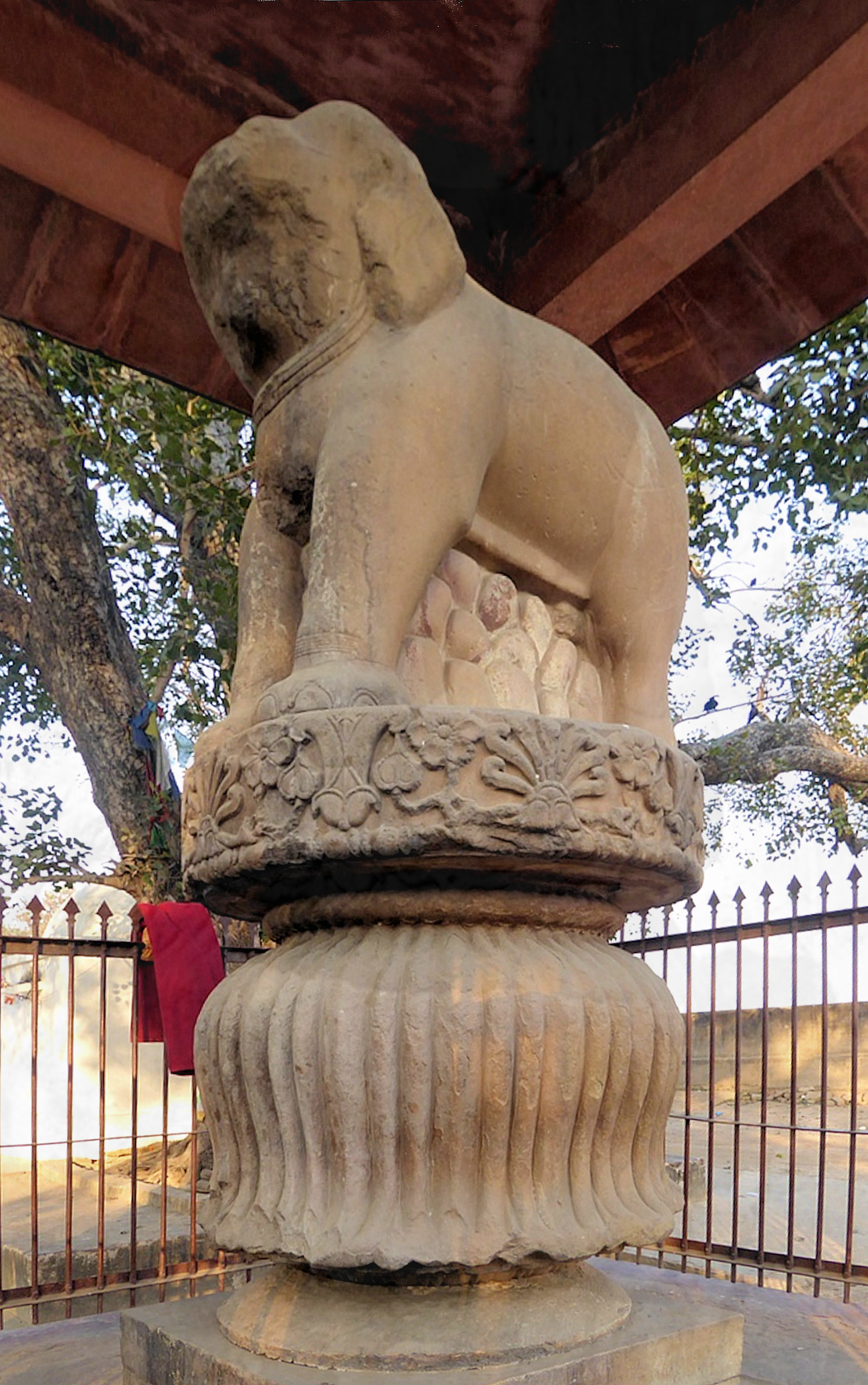
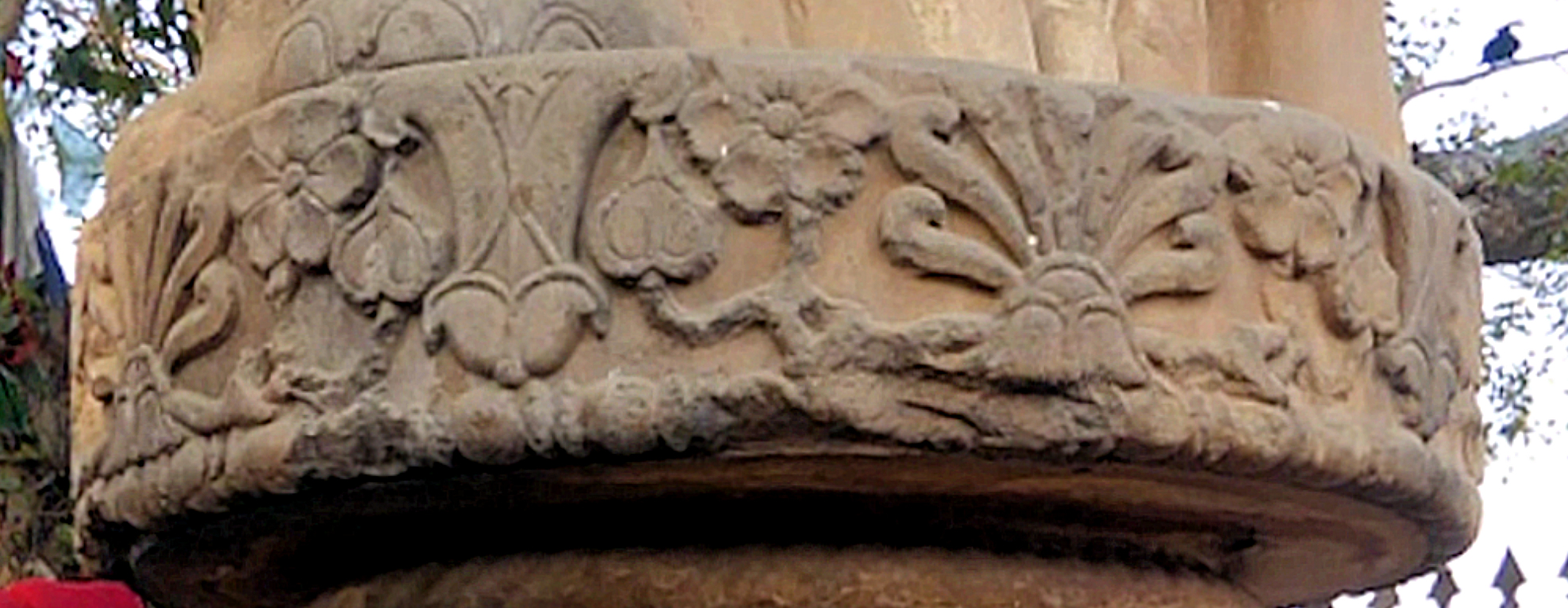
- Elephant capital at Sankissa, one of the Pillars of Ashoka, 3rd century BCE Detail of the abacus.

- Location within India Location within Uttar Pradesh
- 27°20′02″N 79°16′16″E
- Type: Settlement
- Location: Farrukhabad district, Uttar Pradesh, India.

Sankissa ( Pali: Saṅkassa, Sanskrit: Sāṅkāśya ) is an ancient city in India renown for the descent of Gautama Buddha from the Tushita heavens where he taught his mother before landing at Sankissa. Considered among the eight great pilgrimage sites, it was thirty leagues from Sravasti. Around 300 years after the Gautama Buddha's Mahaparinirvana, king Ashoka visited and built a Pillar of Ashoka of which the elephant capital survives. He also built a stupa and a temple commemorating the Buddha's descent from the heavens. The ruins of the stupa are still present, as is a temple of Vishari Devi and an ancient staircase.

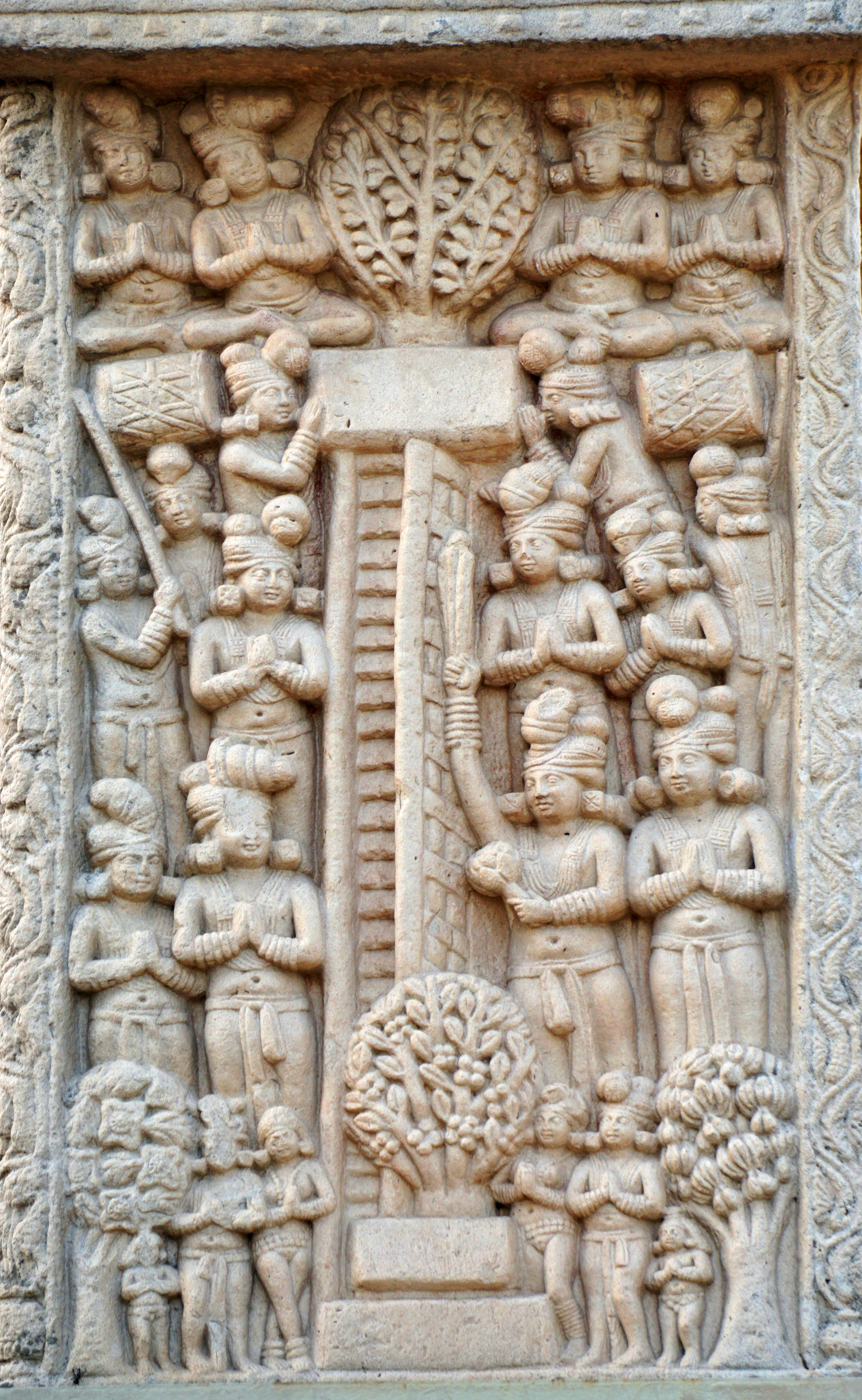
Descent of the Buddha from the Trayastrimsa Heaven at Sankissa.

Sankissa has ruins of ancient Buddhist monasteries, and other monuments from Buddhist and Hindu traditions. The Briton Alexander Cunningham explored the site in 1842.

Sankissa is now identified with Sankisa Basantapura on the north bank of the Ikkhumati river (Kalinadi), between Kampil and Kannauj. It is twenty-three miles west of Fatehgarh, twenty-five south of Kaimganj and forty-five north of Kannauj, in the Farrukhabad district of the Uttar Pradesh state of India.

== The Buddha's return at Sankissa ==
Events at Sankissa are recorded in the Tipitaka. It was at Sankissa that the Buddha returned to earth, after preaching the Abhidhamma Pitaka in Tavatimsa heaven to his mother and to the gods, following his performance of the Twin miracle at Sravasti. As the time approached for the Buddha to leave Távatimsa after his three-month stay, his disciple Moggallana (Anuruddha, according to Sutta Nipāta Commentary ii 570) announced his coming return to the multitude who had been waiting at Sravasti. They had been fed by Culla Anathapindika as Moggallana taught the Dhamma. They all then made their way to Sankissa to meet the Buddha at his return.

The descent of the Buddha took place on the day of the Mahapavarana festival. The king of the gods Indra built three ladders for the Buddha's descent from Mount Meru to the earth with his retinue: On the right was a ladder of gold for the gods; on the left a silver ladder for Maha Brahma and his retinue; and in the middle a ladder of jewels for the Buddha. The assembled people covered the earth for thirty leagues round. At the top of the ladder, there was a clear view of the nine Brahma worlds above and of the Avici hell below. The Buddha was accompanied by many beings including Pañcasikha, Mátali, Mahá Brahmá and Suyáma. His disciple Sariputta was the first to welcome him, followed by Uppalavanna.

On this occasion the Parosahassa Jataka was taught to proclaim to the multitude the unparalleled wisdom of Sariputta. It is also written that the Buddha's descent at Sankissa had provided opportunities for Moggallana to show his eminence in iddhi (supranormal knowledge), Anuruddha in dibbacakkhu (ability to see far), and Punna in his skills in teaching, while the Buddha wished to give Sariputta a chance of showing his profound wisdom.

The location of the city gate of Sankissa is said to be at one of the "unchangeable" spots of the world, or avijahitatthanam, where all of the Buddhas descend to the human world after preaching the Abhidhamma to their mothers in the Heavens. From Sankissa, the Buddha went to Jetavana grove.

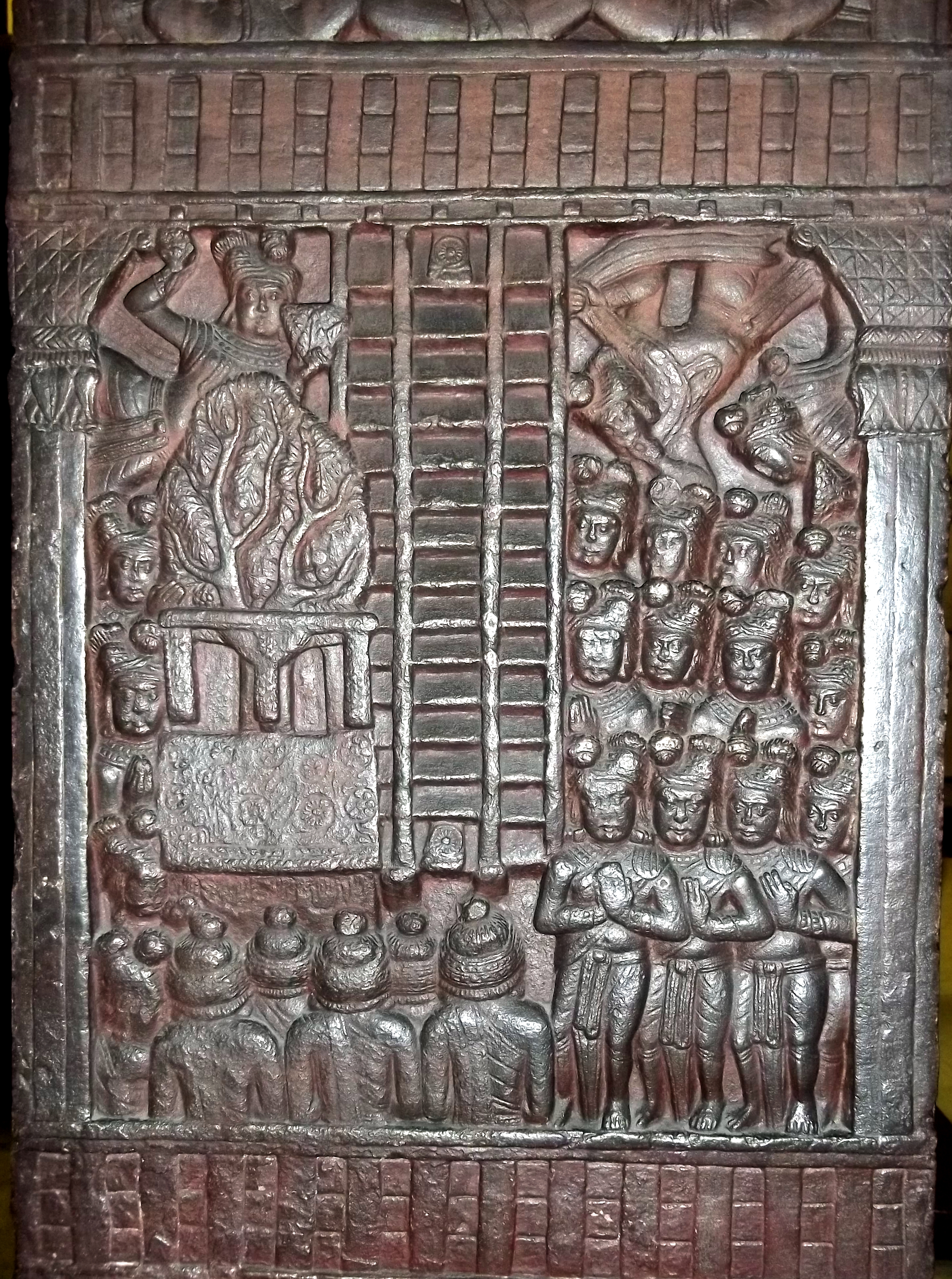
Descent to Sankissa in Bharhut.

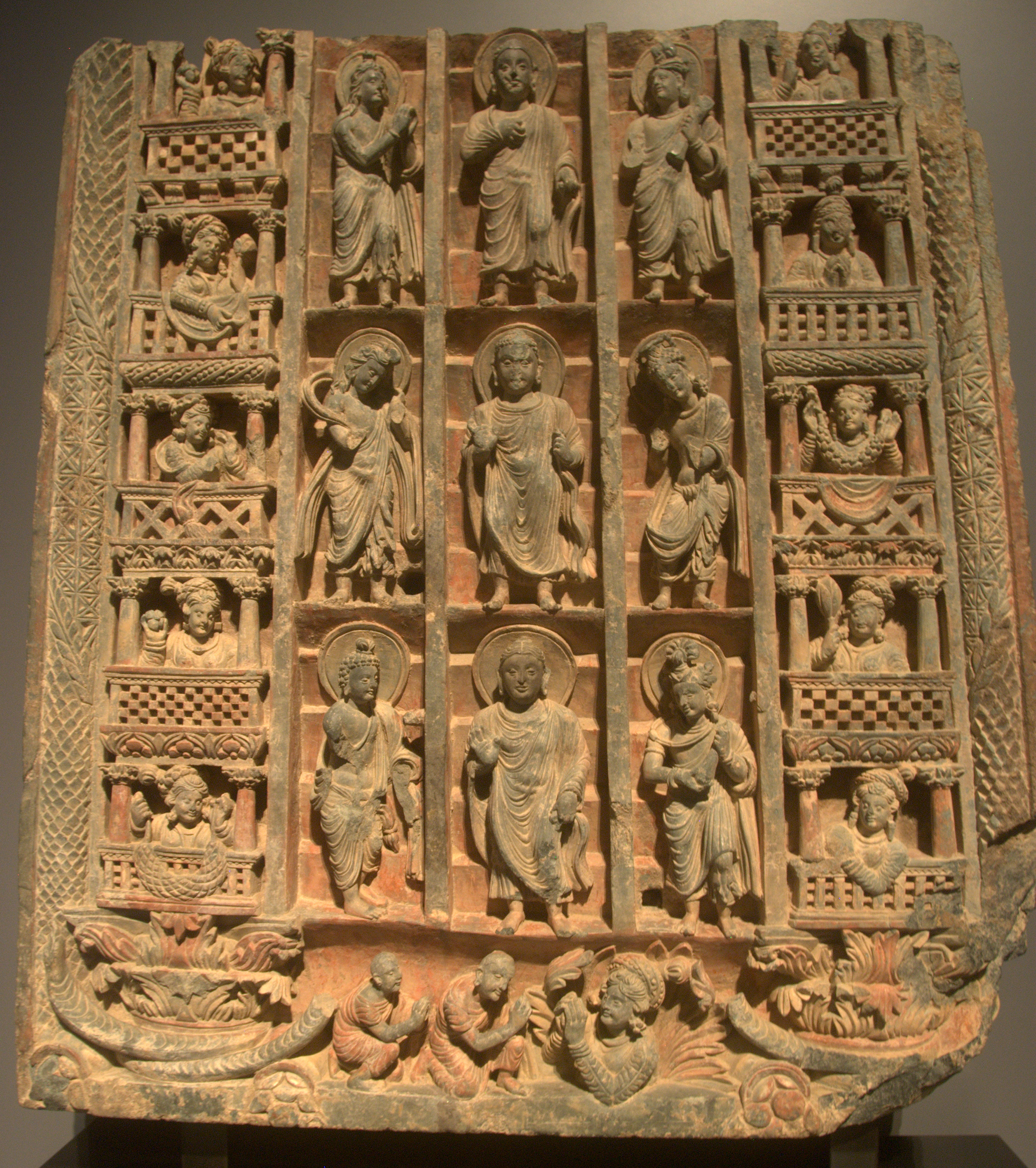
Descent to Sankissa, in the Greco-Buddhist art of Gandhara.

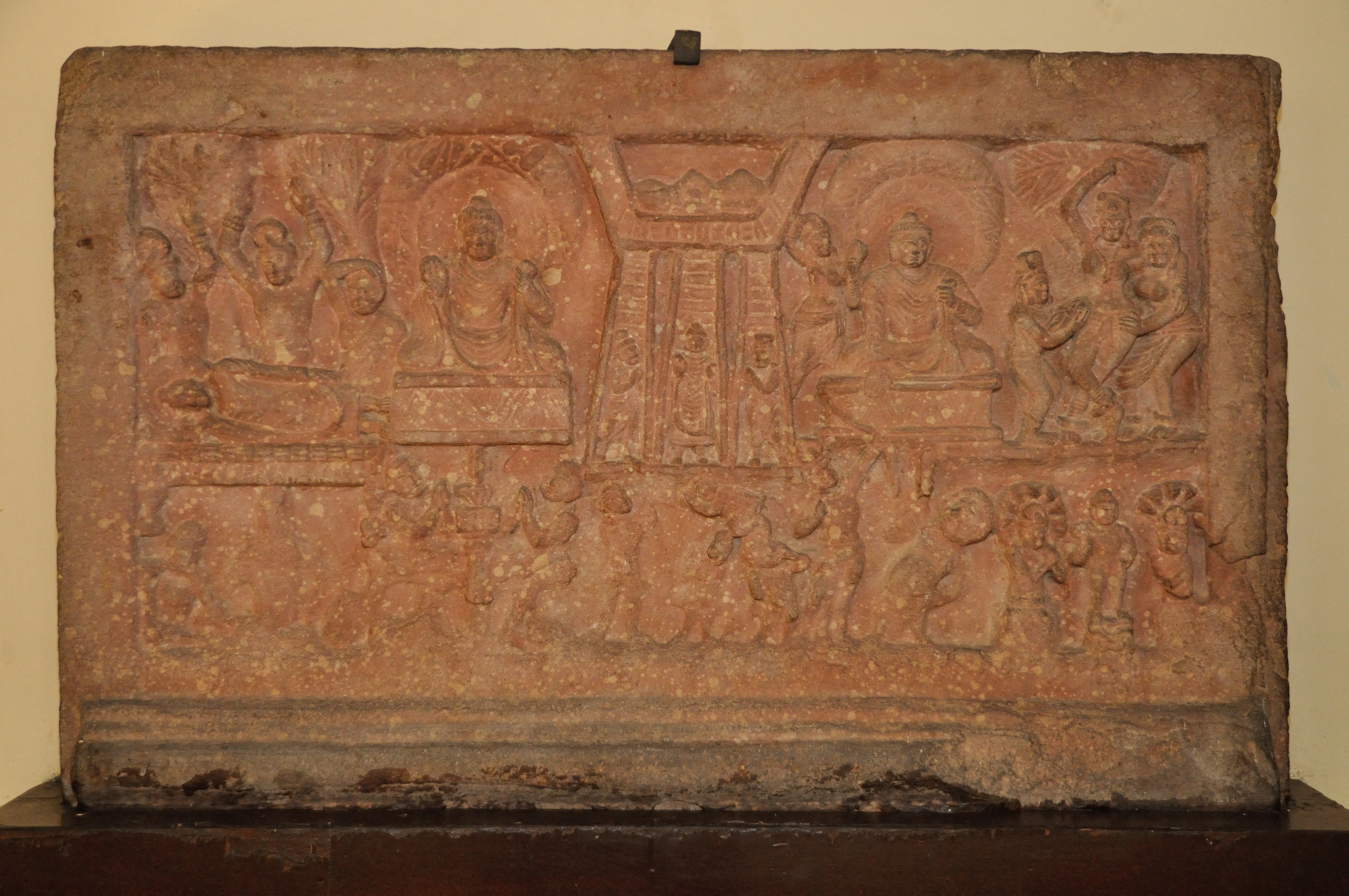
Descent from Heaven, 2nd century CE, Mathura.

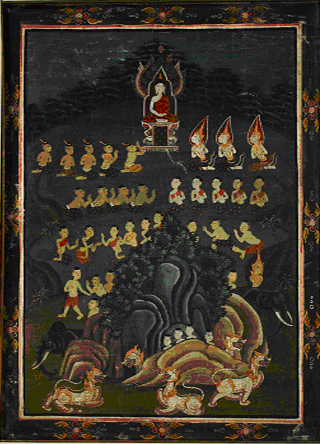
The Buddha Preaching in Sankissa, Thailand

== Architecture ==
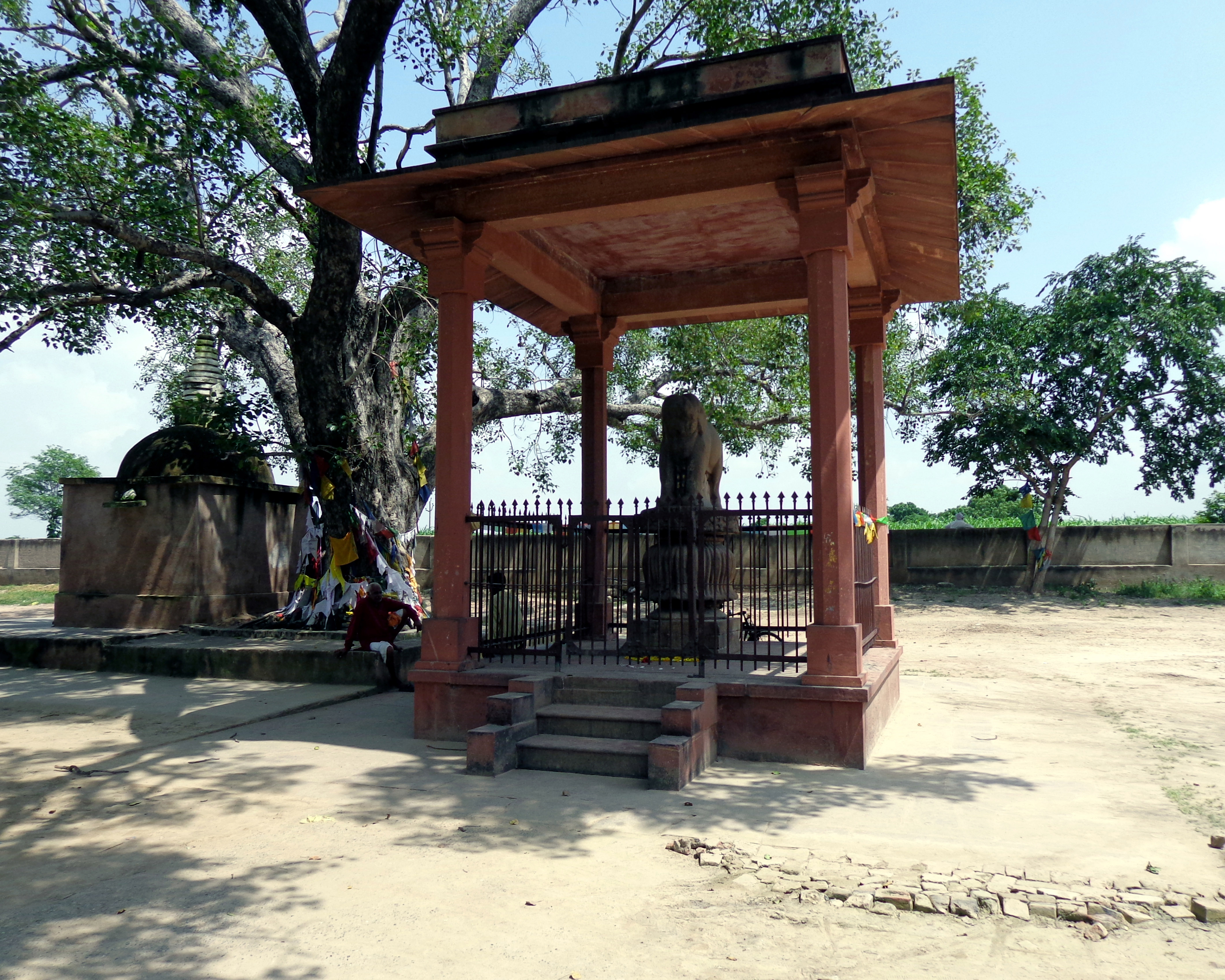
The Sankissa elephant under a protective roof.

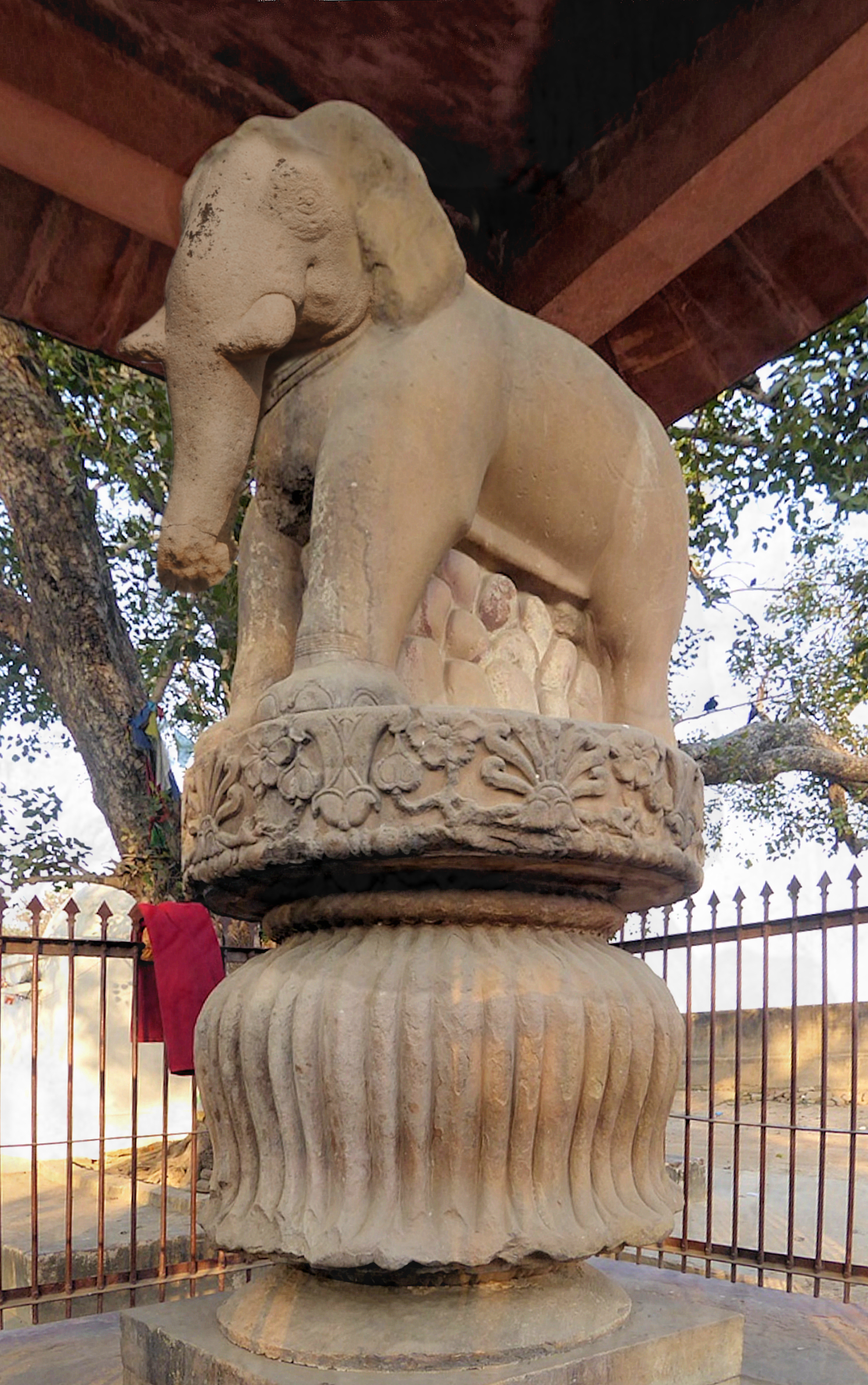
Possible reconstitution of the elephant.

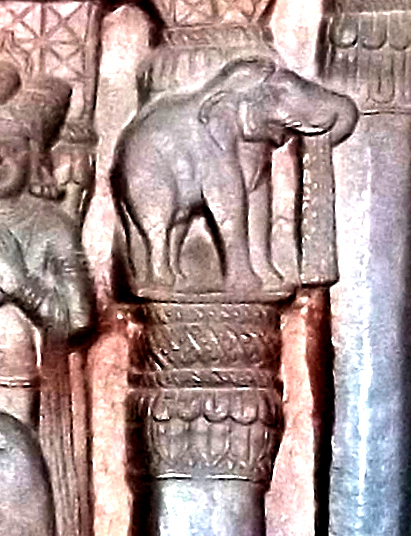
The Bodh Gaya Mahabodhi Temple pillar, another Ashokan elephant pillar, portrayed in a Bharhut relief, 100 BCE.

A shrine was erected on the spot where the Buddha's right foot first touched the ground at Sankissa. When the Chinese pilgrims, Xuanzang and Faxian, visited the place, they found three ladders, which had been built of brick and stone by the ancients, to commemorate the Buddha's descent, but the ladders were nearly sunk in the earth.

There was, in the Buddha's time, a deer park at Sankissa where Suhemanta Thera heard the Buddha preach. During the Vajjiputta controversy, Revata Thera, on his way from Soreyya to Sahajati, went through Sankissa. The road he took passed through Sankissa, Kannakujja, Udumbara and Aggalapura. The excavations carried out in the place did not reveal any artifacts of importance.

An elephant capital from the period of the Mauryas was found at the site.

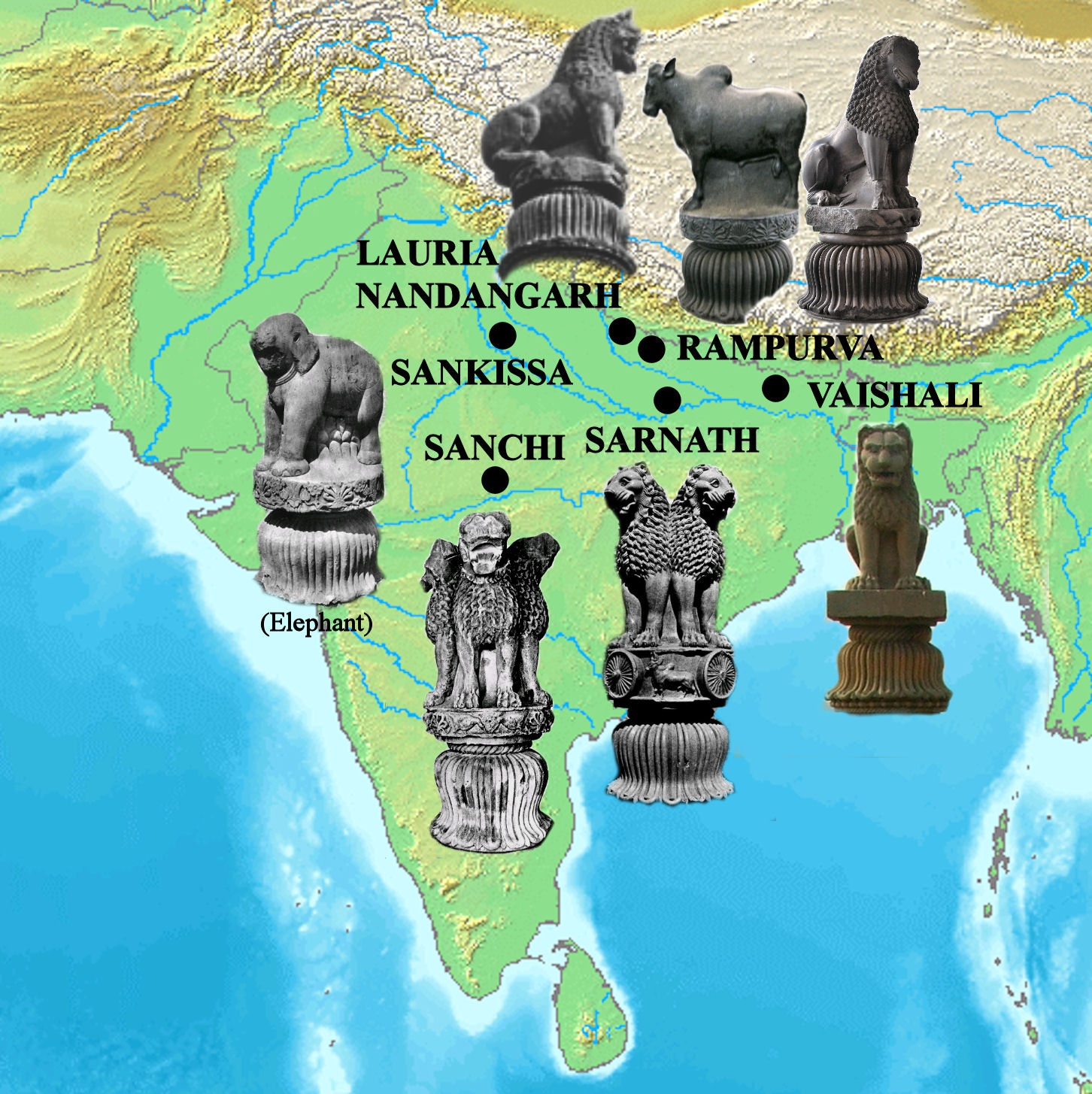
Geographical spread of known capitals of the pillars of Ashoka.

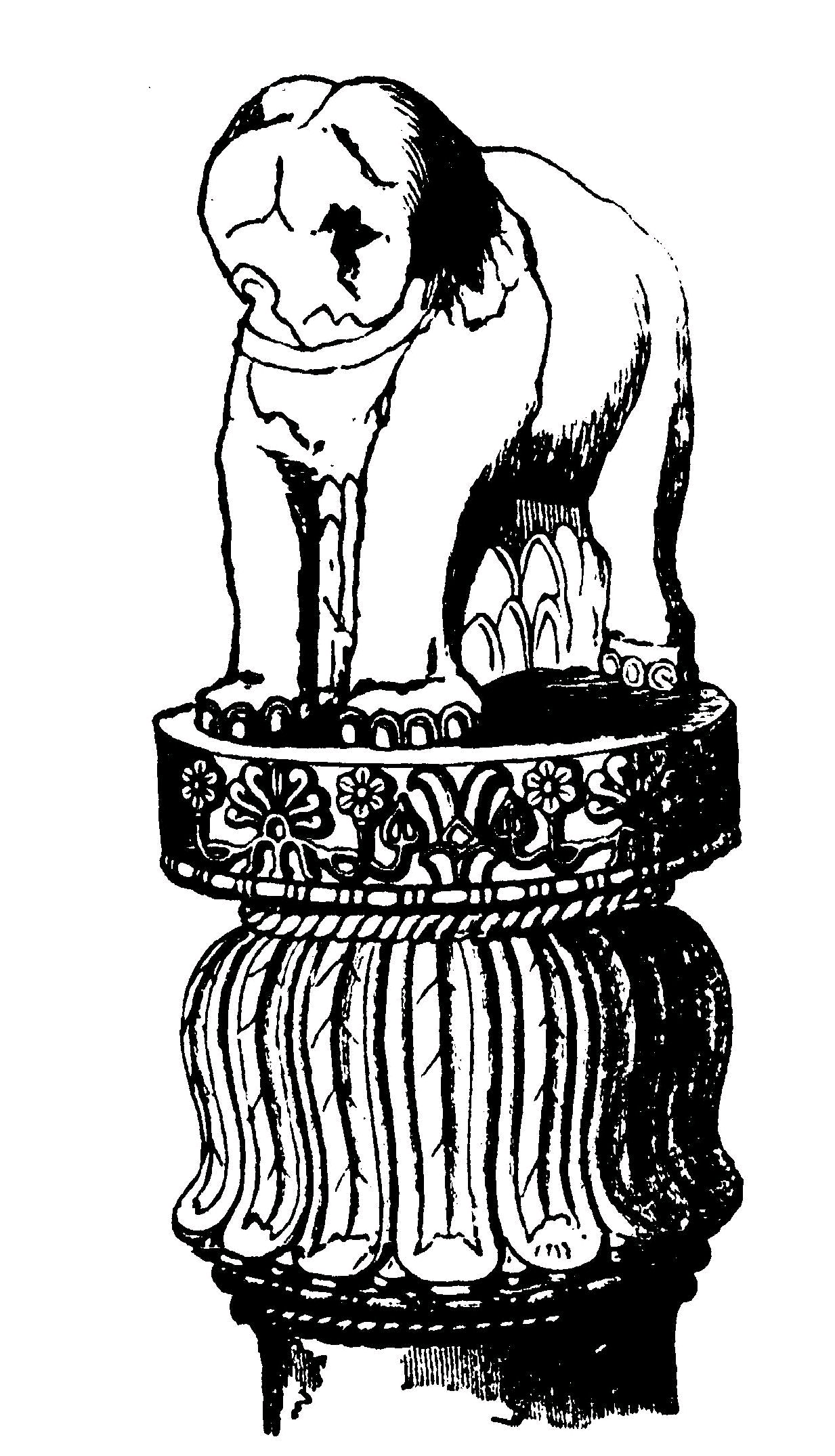
Sankissa elephant (drawing).

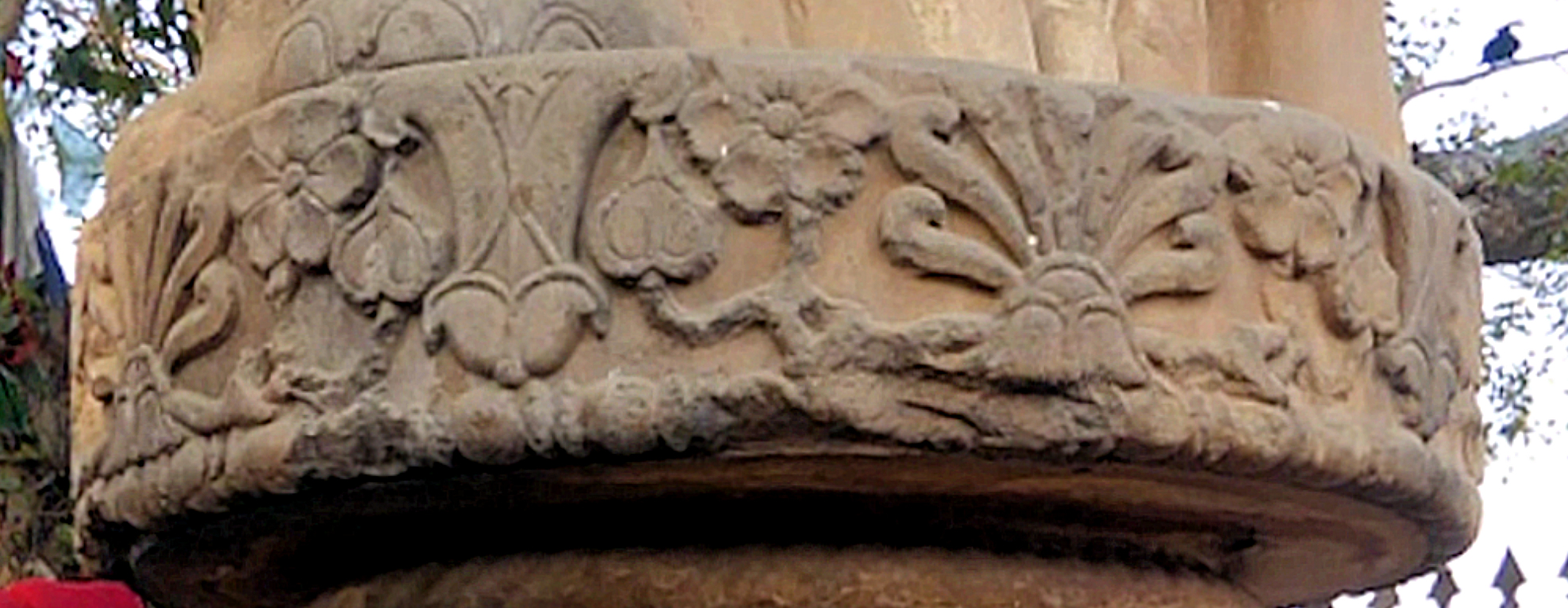
Abacus in hellenistico-Persian style.

== Location ==
Map of Sankissa in relation to other Eight Great Places Buddhist pilgrimage sites and notable nearby cities

Sankissa is about 250 km and is a 4 hours 30 minutes' drive from Kanpur Airport.
