= Ali Ahmed Fazeel =

Pakistani politician

- Born: 5 September 1922; Fatehgarh, United Province, India
- Died: 22 October 2002 (aged 80); Karachi, Pakistan
- Education: Aligarh University
- Occupation: Lawyer
- Title: Attorney General of Pakistan
- Term: 30 October 1986 – 30 May 1988
- Predecessor: Aziz A Munshi
- Successor: Aziz A Munshi

Supreme Court of Pakistan

Ali Ahmed Fazeel (Urdu: علی احمد فضیل; 5 September 1922 in Fatehgarh, United Province, India – 22 October 2002) was a Pakistani Attorney General.

== Aligarh University ==
Fazeel was born to a lawyer. He received his early education at Lucknow and Fatehgarh. Following in his father's footsteps he attended Aligarh Muslim University in the early 1940s. He excelled in school. He passed his MsC (Masters in Science – Major: Geography) in First Division and with First Position. Again, in LLB he had the honour of standing on top of his class of 1945 at Aligarh. The same year, he was the recipient of the Abdul Karim Khan University Medal from Aligarh University. At Aligarh, he was tutored by the eminent Sir Dr. Ziaduddin, namesake of Dr Ziauddin Hospital in Karachi. In the meantime, the Pakistan Movement was gaining momentum, he became the Secretary of Aligarh University Muslim League. He worked alongside Liaqat Ali Khan and Jinnah. Upon graduation, he started his law practice in Fatehgarh, by joining the bar in 1946. Here, he was appointed Joint Secretary of City Musliam League Fatehgarh. He also was a member of the Muslim League Writers Committee.

== Career in Pakistan ==
Pakistan was born in August 1947, and Fazeel moved to Karachi, Pakistan's capital city, in November 1947. There, he became Joint Secretary for Karachi Muslim League and Zonal Secretary for the Zonal Muslim League.

Being a professional lawyer, Fazeel set up his law offices, "Fazeel & Co." in Karachi's Jehangir Kothari building. Later on, he would set up offices at Mohammadi House, located at Karachi's I.I Chundrigarh Rd. Liaqat Ali Khan, was assassinated in mysterious circumstances in 1951. Heartbroken at his mentor's murder, Fazeel quit active politics.

In the early phase of his career, Fazeel temporarily acted as the Special Assistant Public Prosecutor. He enrolled as Advocate Federal Court of Pakistan in 1955. Subsequently, he was enrolled as Senior Advocate of the Supreme Court of Pakistan in 1962. He was twice elected as President Sindh High Court Bar Association. He was Joint Editor of Pakistan Law Reports (P.L.R) and Editor for Weekly Progress. Prior to the partition, he was a delegate at the Indian Science Congress in Nagpur. He acted as Custodian Karachi University. He served as the Legal Advisor to the Custodian of Enemy Property, to the Custodian of Evacuee Property (departments that overlooked the disposition of properties for migrants and emigrants after the independence of Pakistan) and to the university of karachi. He got tenure as lecturer on the faculty at the SM Law College on 8 January 1956. He was Member Board of Studies for Law at Karachi University and Member of the Board of Governors at Sindh Law College.

Fazeel reached the pinnacle of his career amongst Pakistani lawyers in the 1980s. He was counted amongst Pakistan's most eminent lawyers that included Khalid Ishaq, S M Zafar and Sharifuddin Pirzada. He was a member of the Karachi University Syndicate, Pakistan Law Commission, University Grants Commission, elected as the vice-chairman of the Pakistan Bar Council, the Chairman of the Pakistan Bar Council from 1986 to 1988, the Chairman of the High Court Bar Association Benevolent Trust in Karachi, President of the High Court Bar Association (twice), Chairman of Finance Committee of the Pakistan Bar Council, Member Sindh Bar Council, Member West Pakistan Bar Council Disciplinary Tribunal, and hosted the All Pakistan Jurist Conference. He also represented his country as Delegate to the XIV Australian Legal Convention at Adelaide in 1967. He was the Leader of the Pakistan delegation to the International Conference on Drug Abuse and illegal Trafficking, held at Vienna in June 1987 (elected vice-president of conference). He delivered the key note address at the Pakistan Chartered Accountants Conference held at Karachi on 24 May 1984.

== Some of the important cases handled ==
He represented Pakistan Muslim League in Om Mandir Firing Inquiry, was engaged by Pakistan Muslim League to file suit regarding Dawn Trust, addressed the High Court of Sindh as amicus curiae in the matter of the administration of Mohammed Ali Jinnah's "Will", engaged in constitutional petition against the ban on Daily Sun, represented the Government of Pakistan in the Constitutional petition filed by Air Marshal (Retd.) Asghar Khan, Nawabzada Nasrullah Khan and others before the full bench of the Lahore High Court viz-a-viz holding of elections in 1977 and addressed the full bench of the Sindh High Court in the matter of challenge to the authority of the President to amend the constitution. He was invited to address the Supreme Court amicus curiae in a number of pivotal civil and constitutional matters. He represented the Federation of Pakistan in the Supreme Court in appeal filed by Ghulam Mustafa Khar against his detention in 1987 (involving interpretation of Article 270-A of constitution), in Benazir Bhutto's petition regarding Political Parties Act and in the case of the detention of Ghous Ali Shah by Pervez Musharraf in 1999.

On the corporate side, he appeared in some of the most important business litigations of the 80s and 90s concerning Byram Avari, Pakistan Burmah Shell, Jahangir Siddiqui & Co., Tibet Group, Amin Lakhani, Sultan Lakhani, Asharfi Brand Atta, Sohrab Cycle, Akbar Hashwani, Shahzada Citizen Watches, Bishop Lobo vs Cowasjee etc.

== Attorney General For Pakistan ==
In 1985, Muhammad Khan Junejo (then Prime Minister of Pakistan) dismissed the Attorney General A. K. Munshi and offered Mr Fazeel to join his government as the chief law officer of the state. A few years later, Zia ul Haq, the military President in uniform dismissed Junejo due to political rivalry in May 1988. Zia wanted to retain Fazeel and offered him a place in his Zia's Senate Majlis Shoora (the General's version of a technocrat advisory body). However, Fazeel chose to resign. He would often remark to his friends: "The Attorney General comes with the Prime Minister and goes with the Prime Minister." Consequently, he was named amongst Pakistan's 100 most influential citizens in a book published in 1990.

== Junejo case ==
Following the dismissal of the Junejo government, Fazeel was retained by the Former Prime Minister, to contest the dismissal in the Supreme Court of Pakistan, in the famous haji Saifullah's case. The Supreme Court invalidated Zia's action terming it illegal. However, it allowed the Federation of Pakistan to continue with the announced dates of general elections in Pakistan.

== The historical context of PIL (Public Interest Litigation) in Pakistan ==
The seeds of PIL were planted in Pakistan in the mid to late-1980s by notable jurists including Chief Justices Muhammad Haleem and Nasim Hasan Shah and former Attorney General Ali Ahmad Fazeel. In the wake of a newly reintroduced Constitution, elements within judicial circles began to debate the question of how the fundamental rights enshrined therein could be effectively enforced by a population which was (and is) largely ignorant or unaware of their rights. Part of the answer to this question was identified by Chief Justice Muhammad Haleem as a “massification” of society; where citizens were “increasingly drawn together” on the basis of rights and interests. Former Attorney General Ali Ahmad Fazeel and Former Chief Justice of Pakistan Nasim Hasan Shah also recognised the phenomenon of “massification” and, carrying the principle to its logical conclusion, were able to formulate more concrete answers to the question: That the enforcement of the rights of groups of people could be achieved if the law recognised the enforcement of rights beyond the concept of the aggrieved person; that justice for all could be served if the rights of groups of people could be enforced.

== Articles published ==
- My Leader As I Know Him (published in Sindh Information on 13 January 1949, Daily Sun 11 September 1975 and Pakistan Times 11 September 1975)
- With Pakistan's First Prime Minister: "Sun" 16 October 1975
- Raja Mahmoodabad As I Knew Him
- Wveil Plan and After: "Dawn Delhi" 22 July 1945
- Forthcoming Elections (some suggestions): "Dawn Delhi" 16 September 1945
- Assam Eviction Issues: "Dawn Delhi" 24 January 1947
- The Wheel of Progress: "Progress" 16 January 1948
- Whose Homeland: "Progress" 23 January 1948
- Preliminaries of Our Economic Reconstruction: "Aligarh University Magazine Pakistan Number" 1944
- Future of Soybean: "Dawn Delhi" 7 June 1945
- Fixation of Wages: "S.M Law College Journal"
- Legislation as Means of Social Reforms: "Pakistan Bar Council Journal" January 1978
- Refugee Registration: "Progress" 30 Jan 1948
- Pakistan Evacuee Property Ordinance: "Sindh Observer" 8 December 1949
- Power Resources of Pakistan: "Dawn Delhi" 1 April 1945
- Chinese Vestiges in Pakistan: "Dawn" 4 October 1948
- Provincial Languages and the Constitution: "Sun" 5 June 1972
- Censor Not Legal: "Sun" 13 July 1972
- Mr Justice Tufail Ali Abdur Rehman Chief Justice: "Dawn" 16 January 1975
- Reciprocities in Constitution Making: "Dawn" 28 January 1947
- Retrenchment: "Dawn" 11 October 1946
- Grain Procurements or Party Propaganda: "Dawn" 13 June 1946
- Schedule Castes and our Direct Action Day: "Dawn" 12 August 1946
- Nothing But Calculation: "Aligarh University Magazine" 1943
- Congress Clogs in Way of Pakistan: "Deccan Times" 18 May 1947
- Kashmir Adjournment and After: "Progress Weekly" 20 February 1948
- Storm In Tea Cup: "Progress Weekly" 12 February 1948
- Great Sir Syed: "Tahzeeb", "Leader" and "Daily News"

Political offices
Preceded by Aziz A Munshi	Attorney General of Pakistan; October 1986 – May 1988	Succeeded by Yahya Bakhtiar
