= Anwar Farrukhabadi =

- Born: 19 July 1928
- Died: 29 June 2011 (aged 82)
- Occupation: Sufi poet
- Writing career
- Pen name: Fana

Anwar Farrukhabadi (Urdu: انور فرخ آبادی; Hindi: अनवर फर्रुखाबाद), also known as "Fana (فنا)", was a Sufi poet from Farrukhabad district in India. He is known as a lyricist of Ghazal, songs, poems and Qawaali.

== Work ==
He also wrote Marsiya (مرثیہ) and Mashhoor Daastan Hai Shahadat Hussain Ki (مشہور داستاں ہے شہادت حسینؑ کی ), sung by Shamshad Begum and Yusuf Ad.

Farrukhabadi died in Farrukhabad on 29 June 2011.

== Filmography ==
Filmography
Year	Title	Credited as
1959	Bank Manager	Lyricist
1961	Room No.17	Lyricist
1963	Holiday in Bombay	Lyricist
1982	Dil Hi Dil Mein	Lyricist
