= Henry J. Watt =

Scottish experimental psychologist

Henry Jackson Watt
- Born: 1879; Aberdeen, Scotland
- Died: 1925 (aged 45–46)
- Education: University of Aberdeen
- Scientific career
- Fields: Psychology

Henry Jackson Watt (1879–1925) was a Scottish experimental psychologist. He was student of Oswald Külpe and a member of the Würzburg School. He is perhaps best known for his pioneering work on mental set in problem solving, what he referred to as "Einstellung" or "task mental set".

== Biography ==
Watt was born and raised in Aberdeen, Scotland. He entered the University of Aberdeen in 1896, graduating with a Master's degree in philosophy in 1900. He attended the University of Berlin under the supervision of Carl Stumpf in 1901–1902, but then moved on to Külpe and Würzburg, where he completed his doctorate in 1906. Watt's dissertation was on thought processes and problem solving (Experimentelle Beiträge zu einer Theorie des Denkens). An English abstract of his dissertation appeared in the journal article "Experimental Contribution to a Theory of Thinking" (1906).

In 1907 Watt returned to Britain, taking up lectureships in psychophysiology at the University of Liverpool and, in 1908, in psychology at University of Glasgow. In 1909 he published The Economy and Training of Memory, a book for teachers.

He was visiting Würzburg in 1914 when World War I broke out, and was interned in a civilian prisoners camp. He was released and returned to Glasgow in 1915, his health permanently damaged. (American philosopher-psychologist George Stuart Fullerton suffered a similar fate.)

"The Main Principles of Sensory Integration" extended Watt's earlier work about the integration of sensory inputs and its relationship to how the brain organises and synthesises sensory inputs.

In 1917, Watt published The Psychology of Sound, and, in 1919, The Psychology of Music, topics that he had studied under Stumpf more than 15 years earlier.

Watt died in 1925 at the age of 46. Two additional books were published posthumously: The Sensory Basis and Structure of Knowledge (1925) and The Common Sense of Dreams (1929). In the latter, Watt proposed an alternative to Sigmund Freud's method of dream interpretation.

== Books ==
- Watt, H. J. (1906) Experimental Contribution to a Theory of Thinking. Journal of Anatomy and Physiology, 40(3), 257–266.
- Watt, H. J. (1929) The Commonsense of Dreams. International University Series in Psychology. London: Humphrey Milford, Oxford University Press.
