= Revata =

Elder Revata was one of the Elders who took a prominent part in the Second Buddhist Council. His other name was Soreyya Revata. He lived in Soreyya, and, on discovering (by means of his divine ear) that the orthodox monks, led by Sambhūta Sānavāsī and Yasa Kākandakaputta, were anxious to consult him, Revata left Soreyya, and, traveling through Sankassa, Kannakujja, Udumbara and Aggalapura, reached Sahajāti.

There the monks met Elder Revata and consulted him regarding the "Ten Points which were practiced by Vajjiputian monks."

1. Storing salt in a horn.
2. Eating after midday.
3. Eating once and then going again to a village for alms.
4. Holding the Uposatha Ceremony with monks dwelling in the same locality.
5. Carrying out official acts when the assembly was incomplete.
6. Following a certain practice because it was done by one's tutor or teacher.
7. Eating sour milk after one had his midday meal.
8. Consuming strong drink before it had been fermented.
9. Using a rug which was not the proper size.
10. Using gold and silver.

He enquired into these, and, after condemning them as wrong, decided to end the dispute. The Vajjiputtakas, too, had tried to win Revata over to their side, but on failing to do so, persuaded Revata's pupil, Uttara, to accept robes, etc., from them, and speak to his teacher on their behalf. Uttara did this, but was dismissed by Revata as an unworthy pupil. Revata suggested that the dispute should be settled in Vesāli, and the monks having agreed, he visited Sabbakāmī, who was the oldest monk then living and a pupil of Ānanda. Revata himself was a pupil of Ānanda and had seen the Buddha during the night, and talked to him on matters of doctrine. During the conversation, Sānavāsī arrived and questioned Sabbakāmī regarding the Ten Points, but the latter refused to express an opinion in private. On Revata's suggestion, a jury of eight, four from either side, was appointed to go into the question. Revata himself was a member of this jury, and he it was who questioned Sabbakāmī during the meeting, held in Vālikārāma, regarding the Ten Points. All the Ten Points were declared to be wrong, and, at the end of the questions, seven hundred monks – chosen from one hundred and twelve thousand, at the head of whom was Revata – held a recital of the Dhamma, which recital therefore came to be called Sattasatī ("Seven Hundred"). This recital lasted for eight months. It gives an account of this Council, which account differs in numerous details. In both accounts it is Revata who takes the most prominent part in settling the dispute. The introduces Kālāsoka as the patron of the Second Council. it would appear from the Dpv. account that the heretics refused to accept the decision of Revata's Council and separated off, to the number of ten thousand, forming a new body called the Mahāsanghikas.
