= Anna Martha Fullerton =

American physician

- Born: August 16, 1853; Agra, India
- Died: September 16, 1938 (aged 85); Dehradun, India
- Occupations: Medical educator, physician, hospital administrator, textbook author
- Years active: 1880s-1910s
- Relatives: George Stuart Fullerton (brother)

Anna Martha Fullerton (August 16, 1853 – September 16, 1938) was an American physician and medical educator, born in India.

== Early life and education ==
Anna Martha Fullerton was born in Agra, the eldest of the seven children of American Presbyterian missionaries Rev. Robert Stewart Fullerton and Martha White Fullerton. She was 12 when her father died, and she moved to Philadelphia with her widowed mother and younger siblings. She trained as a teacher, then attended the Woman's Medical College of Pennsylvania, studying obstetrics under Dr. Anna Broomall and graduating with a medical degree in 1882.

One of her brothers was philosopher and psychologist George Stuart Fullerton.

== Career ==
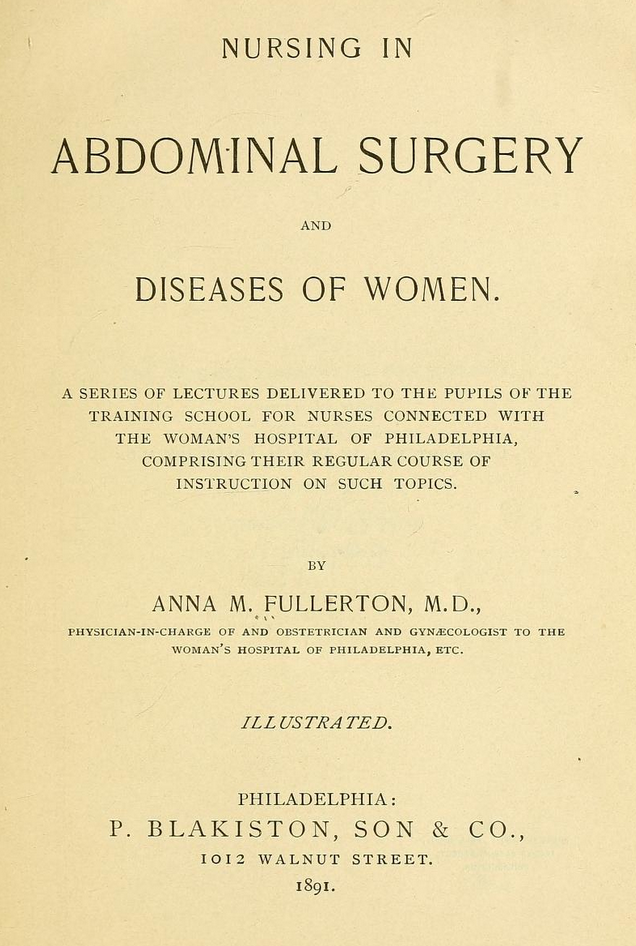
The title page of Nursing in Abdominal Surgery and Diseases of Women (1891) by Anna M. Fullerton, M. D.

Fullerton joined the faculty of the Women's Medical College of Pennsylvania after she graduated, taught obstetrics and gynecology courses, and was physician-in-charge of the Woman's Hospital of Philadelphia from 1886 to 1896. She had a private practice in Philadelphia for a few years, then returned to India in 1899, to teach at the Christian Medical College in Ludhiana, the first medical school for women in India. In 1902 she and her sister Mary started working toward raising funds and establishing a hospital at Fatehgarh; the Fullerton Memorial Hospital for Women and Children opened in 1907.

Fullerton wrote two nursing textbooks: A Handbook of Obstetrical Nursing for Nurses, Students, and Mothers (1891), and Nursing in Abdominal Surgery and Diseases of Women (1893). She also wrote a health textbook for schoolchildren in India, The Human Body and How to Take Care of It. She wrote on "Missionary Work and Public Health" for the Women's Medical College of Pennsylvania Alumnae Association conference in 1900. That same year, her essay "The Woman Physician in India" was published in the college's alumnae journal.

Fullerton and her sister Mary moved to Dehradun in 1911; she continued practicing medicine and midwifery there.

== Personal life and legacy ==
In 1911, Fullerton spent some months in Hartford, Connecticut, caring for her dying brother Edward. Her sister Mary died in 1931, and Fullerton died in 1938, aged 85 years, in Dehradun. Her papers are in the collections of Drexel University and the Presbyterian Historical Society.
