= Rajepur =

- Market
- Location in Uttar Pradesh, India Rajepur (India)
- Coordinates: 26°17′10″N 83°07′50″E
- Country: India
- State: Uttar Pradesh
- Established: 16
- Founder: 1910
- Named for: Raja Mishra

Government
  - Type: Town Aria
- Elevation: 1,349 m (4,426 ft)

Population (2011)
  - Total: 15,632
  - Rank: 5

Languages
  - Official: Hindi, Awadhi, English
- Time zone: UTC+5:30 (IST)
- PIN: 224176
- Vehicle registration: UP 45
- Sex ratio: 1000/1200 ♂/♀

Rajepur is a town in Ambedkar Nagar district in the Indian state of Uttar Pradesh and is Subpost Office of Rajesultanpur.

== Demographics ==
As of 2011 India census, Rajepur had a population of 15632. Males constitute 51% of the population and females 49%. Rajepur has an average literacy rate of 62%, higher than the national average of 59.5%: male literacy is 71%, and female literacy is 52%. In Rajepur, 17% of the population is under 6 years of age.

Religions in Rajepur
Religion	Percent
Hindus	75%
Muslims	25%
Jains	0%
Others†	0%
Distribution of religions †Includes Sikhs (0%), Buddhists (<0%).

== Nearby settlements ==
- Rajesultanpur 0.3 km
- Tanda 53 km
- Azamgarh 28 km
- Gorakhpur 62 km
- Faizabad 124 km
