= Oswald Külpe =

German structural psychologist (1862–1915)

- Born: 3 August 1862; Kandau, Governorate of Courland, Russian Empire
- Died: 30 December 1915 (aged 53); Munich, Kingdom of Bavaria, German Empire
- Education: Leipzig University
- Known for: Würzburg School
- Scientific career
- Fields: Psychology
- Workplaces: University of Würzburg
- Doctoral advisor: Wilhelm Wundt
- Doctoral students: Max Wertheimer, Ernst Bloch
- Other notable students: Karl Bühler

Theodor Oswald Rudolph Külpe (German: [ˈkʏlpə]; 3 August 1862 – 30 December 1915) was a German structural psychologist of the late 19th and early 20th century. Külpe, who is less well-known than his German mentor, Wilhelm Wundt, revolutionized experimental psychology at his time. In his obituary, Aloys Fischer wrote that, “undoubtedly Külpe was the second founder of experimental psychology on German soil; for with every change of base he made it a requirement that an experimental laboratory should be provided.”

Külpe studied as a doctoral student and assistant to Wundt at the University of Leipzig, though his ideas differed from Wundt's as he developed his own research (Boring, 1961). Külpe made significant contributions to the field of psychology, some of which are still relevant, including the systematic experimental introspection, imageless thoughts, mental sets, and abstraction.

== Biography ==
In August 1862, Oswald Külpe was born in Kandau, Courland, one of the Baltic provinces of the Russian Empire, to Baltic German parents. Consequently, Külpe's native tongue was German. His father was a notary, while a brother, Alfons Külpe, was a clergyman, and a sister was a nurse. He lived a large portion of his life with his older, unmarried cousins, Ottillie and Marie Külpe, at their residences in Leipzig, Würzburg, Bonn, and Munich. He never married either and throughout the years he devoted an immense amount of time to his work. It was said that Külpe would joke that science was his bride. He learned Russian during his training at the Gymnasium in Libau, where he graduated in 1879. He then taught history and other subjects at a boys’ school for a year and a half before relocating to Leipzig. In 1881, he enrolled in the University of Leipzig. He focused his studies mostly on history, however he attended the lectures of Wilhelm Wundt. In these, he became familiar with the blossoming field of psychology, the area upon which his life work eventually would be focused. In between 1882 and 1883, Külpe studied at the University of Berlin, where he attended the lectures of Heinrich von Treitschke, a nationalist German historian. Following his studies in Berlin, he transferred to Göttingen, where he spent two years as a student of Georg Elias Müller, where it is said he received the idea for his doctoral dissertation.

Following his time with Müller, he returned to Leipzig to study under Wundt as his assistant in the autumn of 1886. On 12 October 1887, Külpe was awarded his PhD. He titled his thesis "Zur Theorie der sinnlichen Gefühle" ("Regarding the Theory of Sensual Feeling"). This is a topic that Külpe was interested in over the course of his life, and especially influenced his later studies and lectures on aesthetics. He then became Privatdozent at Leipzig University, before being promoted to a professorship extraordinarius in 1894. In October 1894, he assumed the position of professor ordinarius–the highest obtainable rank as a professor at a German university–at the University of Würzburg, where he taught both philosophy and aesthetics. It was here in 1896 that Külpe founded a psychological laboratory. He was able to increase the size and improve the equipment until the Würzburg laboratory became the most outstanding institute of psychology in Germany, aside from Leipzig. Here, he trained numerous influential psychologists, including the likes of Max Wertheimer, Narziß Ach, and Henry J. Watt.

Following fifteen years of service at the lead of the Würzburg laboratory, Külpe also established first-rate psychological institutes at the University of Bonn and the Ludwig-Maximilians-Universität München. It was his innovative experimental psychology methods and success in establishing these psychological institutes that led to Külpe being referred to as the second founder of experimental psychology on German soil. Though Külpe and Wundt differed on matters of principle, Külpe regarded Wundt highly and published three tributes to him. In his later years, Külpe began to focus less on psychological issues and more on his interests in philosophical problems such as esthetics, where it seemed his true passion lay. Just before Christmas of 1915, Külpe suffered a bout of influenza. He recovered to the point where he was able to return to his university teachings. He was, however, suffering from a heart infection, which he succumbed to on 30 December, after a few days of illness. It was said that had he lived longer, Külpe likely would have accepted the request to succeed Friederich Jodl and establish a psychological laboratory at the University of Vienna as well.

== Laboratory at Würzburg ==
By 1896, Külpe had founded a laboratory at the University of Würzburg and remained there for fifteen years. He received a private endowment and he managed to make it one of the foremost psychological institutes, second only to the University of Leipzig. At the Würzburg school, a key area of focus was the development and formation of concepts. Külpe and his students expanded the use of introspection and were the first to research thought processes using experimental methods (Watson, 1978). In doing so, they developed and improved the process of what became known as systematic experimental introspection, which was the retrospective reporting of the experiences of a subject after performing a complex task involving thinking, remembering, or judging. Abstraction experiments were especially important in distinguishing relevant features of objects for individuals in differing stages of development. Throughout his time at Würzburg he acted as a devoted teacher and administrator. In fact, most of his prestige comes from his dedication to his students and the hard work he directed towards his teaching duties.

Though he published many of his own personal works, Külpe never penned any of the traditional Würzburg papers, so it is difficult to specify his personal interpretation of the work of the school. However, in many of his personal works, he often anticipated notions that were later discussed by his students. Külpe managed to exert his influence on the field of psychology via his students. Max Wertheimer, the founder of Gestalt psychology was undoubtedly his most famous student. However other noteworthy students include Narziß Ach and Henry Watt, both of whom worked on the concept of mental set; Robert Morris Ogden, who played a major role in introducing Gestalt psychology to the United States; and Kurt Koffka, one of the founders of the Gestalt school.

Distinct from the view of Wundt, the Würzburg school developed an innovative, holistic view, where the focus was on studying both act and content. This research established a strong foundation for the Gestalt psychologists who were to come. This research was not the only notable contribution to psychology made by the Würzburg school. The emphasis on motivation and the role that it plays in the results of thinking was stressed at the school and is still relevant today. Today, it is still a widely accepted principle that motivation is a variable that affects thinking outcomes. Another contribution from the school was the theory that the behaviour of the ‘id’ depended not only on the element within the thinker's consciousness, but that there were unconscious determinants of behaviour as well. This is another notable idea born from the Würzburg school that is still relevant and widely accepted in psychology today.

== Imageless thought ==
Perhaps the most famous psychological contribution to come out of the Würzburg Laboratory was related to Külpe's beliefs in philosophical realism. The work focused on the idea of imageless thought, which is the belief that there is an objective significance that can be found within experiences that are not necessarily associated with specific words, symbols or signs. Külpe anticipated the notion of imageless thought in his early work as evidenced in Grundriss der Psychologie. He used an experiment to demonstrate that our ability to recognize something one has seen before is unrelated to whether or not we can remember an image of it. In his demonstrative experiment, he took participants into a darkened room and asked them to visualize colors as he called them out. In all situations but one, participants were able to visualize the colors. The participant who was unable to visualize the colors had no cognitive deficits, which led Külpe to his conclusion that recognition is independent of remembrance

Külpe believed that the research on thought processes up to that point, including Wundt's study on the associations between thoughts and images, had been incomplete. Influenced by his interest in philosophy, Külpe believed that there were certain sensations, feelings, or presentations that could neither be described nor associated in the mind with an image. Once they were given the opportunity to objectively self-observe and describe what was neither sensation, feeling, nor presentation, yet was still a thought process, Külpe and his colleagues identified the need for new definitions and concepts aside from those that already exist. For example, Külpe and his students, A.M. Mayer and J. Orth, identified that following the presentation of the stimulus word “meter”, an indescribable conscious process occurred that led to the subject responding with the word “trochee”. This, they proposed, indicated that Wundt was wrong in his belief that all events in the thought process have either associated or direct images. Their research, although imperfect, using the systematic experimental introspection methods that Külpe and the students had developed and refined, established a foundation for imageless thought research that is still relevant and debated within the field of psychology today.

== Abstraction and attention ==
In the early 1900s, Külpe performed experiments on the concept of abstraction at the Würzburg School. Külpe defined abstraction as a process in which one focuses on certain aspects of reality while ignoring others. In one famous experiment, Külpe instructed participants to observe a display of numbers, letters, colors, and shapes. For example, if he told the participants beforehand to report on the numbers observed, then they were unable to describe the letters, colors, or shapes with any accuracy after the experiment. If he told participants to describe the colors, then with subsequent questioning, they were unable to describe the letters, numbers, or shapes. The item people could describe with the highest level of accuracy was always the item they were instructed to observe. These results indicated that the subjects of the experiment would abstract the requested features, while at the same time remaining “unconscious” to all of the other present features. Külpe wrote in a letter about the conclusions from these experiments: "The old doctrine of an inner sense with the involved idea of a distinction between the reality of consciousness and objectivity must now have its opportune renewal in the domain of psychology. This is the principal conclusion I would draw from my experiments. In connection there with I define abstraction as the process by which the logically or psychologically effective is separated from the logically or psychologically ineffective. The effective partial contents are positively abstracted for thinking and ideation. The ineffective are those from which the abstraction is made. For our consciousness, therefore, there are abstract ideas; for psychical reality, there are only concrete ideas. At the same time the old controversy between nominalism and realism approaches its solution."

In another letter, Külpe identified a key distinction in his ideas as compared to Wundt's ideas. Külpe differentiates 'thought' from 'thinking'. Thoughts are 'contents’, he argues, whereas thinking in its various forms, such as meaning, judging, and concluding, can be considered acts or functions. In this case, the contents are the thoughts themselves, whereas the acts or functions are the thinking process. To Külpe, function and content are different and independently variable. He proposed that the acts or functions are not analyzable in consciousness, are relatively unstable, and can only be observed and known after an event has occurred. In order to observe them, Külpe's process of systematic experimental introspection is critical. Külpe believed that contents, on the other hand, are analyzable in consciousness, observable in introspection, and relatively stable. He also cautioned against speculating about what is occurring physiologically at the time of thinking. Instead, Külpe encouraged the finding and improving of facts on the subject. That is, ignore the physiological processes occurring as part of the thinking process, but instead, introspect upon what you know has occurred. As a result of his experiment, Külpe determined that visual perception is determined not only by external stimulation but also by Aufgabe, which is another word for the task or directive. Since he varied the Aufgabe (task) slightly in each session of the experiment, he was able to find a correlation between the range of attention and degree of consciousness. He found that the wider one's span of attention, the lower one's degree of consciousness is to any specific aspect, and vice versa. He concluded that there is a limited amount of energy driving attention and that this limitation is constant. He also concluded that the abstraction process is based on apprehension, rather than sensational differences in presentation, and that these two concepts are distinct.

== Mental set ==
Külpe and his Würzburg associates also used his abstraction experiments to reject associationism as the elementary thinking method. For example, in situations where participants were asked to provide a superordinate category, or superior group within a classification system, for birds, they were more likely to respond by saying, 'Animal' than a specific bird, such as a 'hummingbird.' As a result, Külpe and the students at the Würzburg laboratory concluded that behavior such as the above example could not be explained according to associationistic logic. They determined that the actual task, instead of the stimulus, directs the thinking process. This mechanism became known as the mental set. Specifically, the mental set refers to an innate tendency to respond a certain way. Eventually, the mental set was seen as a factor that could account for a large portion of the variation in the ways that people solve problems.

== Major works ==
Oswald Külpe's books and published works cover a variety of subject matter, which impacted his interest in psychology. Examples of his publication topics include logic, aesthetics, philosophy, and epistemology. His first major book, published in 1893, was Grundriss der Psychologie. The handbook summarized a comprehensive amount of experimental research at the time, including new research on reaction time, contributions to psychophysics, Carl Stumpf's research into tonal fusions, and Hermann Ebbinghaus’ research on memory. He defined psychology as "the facts of experience," as the book concerned itself strictly with scientific fact. The lack of focus on the concept of thought in his book is interesting because the Würzburg school greatly researched mental set and imageless thought. He once wrote to a colleague, however, that the concepts behind the book were, “the source of the investigations in the psychology of thinking.” So, he had anticipated the idea of imageless thought in this publication. Külpe was still under the shadow of Wundt during this time. In fact, only one of his distinctive views was included, which was his criticism of the subtractive procedure on reaction time. Two years later, Grundriss der Psychologie was translated into English by Edward Titchener under the title Outlines of Psychology.

In 1895, Külpe published a handbook called Einleitung in die Philosophie (which translates to Introduction to Philosophy). This book was a guide to both past and present philosophy at the time, and a basic text for German university students of not just general philosophy, but psychology, logic, ethics, and aesthetics as well. In the book, Külpe also looks at the relations of the body and the mind, and in doing so, takes a dualistic position. Külpe also gives a clear description of the relationship between physical and psychical, or in other words, natural science and psychology. He identifies the possibility of what he refers to as a mind substance. He theorized that both matter and mind are abstractions from thought experience. He believed that if matter required the idea of substance, why would the mind not require substance as well? The book is less than 350 pages and went through seven editions and four translations, including into English by W. B. Pillsbury and Titchener under the title Introduction to Philosophy.

In 1912, Külpe published Über die moderne Psychologie des Denkens, which translates into English as On the Modern Psychology of Thinking. In this book, he was looking back on his focus on the systematic experimental introspection method. He believed that before systematic experimental introspection existed, research on thought was incomplete. He also believed that having the subject report only on sensations, feelings, and presentations in thought research was severely limiting in that it did not provide an acceptable opportunity to identify what could be considered neither sensation, feeling, nor presentation. Once they were given the opportunity to objectively self-observe and describe what was neither sensation, feeling, nor presentation, yet was still a thought process, Külpe and his colleagues identified the need for new definitions and concepts aside from those that already exist. As Külpe wrote: “The subjects began to speak in the language of life and assign less importance to the presentations for their inner world. They knew and thought, they judged and understood, they grasped the meaning and saw connections without receiving any real help from occasionally occurring imagery.”

Die Realisierung, a three-volume text composed of Külpe's lectures, was published from 1912 through 1923. Other notable publications include the publication of a monograph, Zur Katagorienlehre, which was presented in the year of his untimely death, 1915, before the Bavarian Academy of Science. Other books by Külpe include the 1912 publication of Psychologie und Medizin and Philosophie der Gegenwart.
