= George Stuart Fullerton =

American philosopher and psychologist

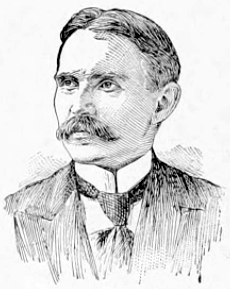
- Born: August 18, 1859; Fatehgarh, British India
- Died: March 23, 1925 (aged 65); Poughkeepsie, New York, U.S.
- Occupations: Philosopher, psychologist
- Spouses: Rebekah Daingerfield Smith (m. 1884; died 1892) Julia Winslow Dickerson (m. 1897)

Academic background
- Education: University of Pennsylvania; Yale Divinity School

Academic work
- Institutions: University of Pennsylvania
- Doctoral students: Edgar A. Singer Jr.

George Stuart Fullerton (August 18, 1859 – March 23, 1925) was an American philosopher and psychologist.

== Early life and education ==
Fullerton was born in Fatehgarh, British India, the son of the Rev. Robert Stuart Fullerton and Martha White Fullerton, American Presbyterian missionaries. He moved to Philadelphia with his widowed mother and his siblings, after his father's death in 1865. He graduated in 1879 from the University of Pennsylvania and in 1884 from Yale Divinity School.

== Career ==
Fullerton returned to the University of Pennsylvania to be an instructor, adjunct professor, and dean of the department of philosophy, dean of the college, and vice provost of the university. In 1904 he was appointed professor of philosophy at Columbia University, and served as head of the department.

In 1890, Fullerton was elected to the American Philosophical Society. He was the host of the first annual meeting of the American Psychological Association in 1892 at the University of Pennsylvania, and the APA's fifth president, in 1896.

In 1914, while he was an exchange professor at the University of Vienna, World War I broke out. He was lecturing at Munich, Germany when interned. Fullerton was imprisoned as a civilian enemy national. He remained imprisoned for four years, until the end of the war, and conditions were so harsh that he returned to the U.S. with his health permanently damaged. (Scottish psychologist Henry J. Watt suffered a similar fate.)

== Personal life ==
In 1884 Fullerton married Miss Rebekah Daingerfield Smith of Alexandria, Virginia; she died in 1892. Five years later, he married Julia Winslow Dickerson of Philadelphia, his widow. There were no children. Nearly an invalid for the last decade of his life, Fullerton died by suicide on March 23, 1925, at the age of 66. He was survived by his sisters in India, teacher Mary Fullerton, and physician Anna Martha Fullerton.

== Selected publications ==
Fullerton's philosophy was realist. His writings include:

- The Conception of the Infinite (1887)
- A Plain Argument for God (1889)
- On Sameness and Identity (1890)
- On the Perception of Small Differences, with Cattell (1892)
- The Philosophy of Spinoza (1894)
- On Spinozistic Immortality (1899)
- A System of Metaphysics (1904)
- An Introduction to Philosophy (1906)An Introduction to Philosophy. Reprint. Publisher: Ruby Press & Co.First Edition: 2015 ISBN 978-9-3823-9537-9
- The World We Live in, or Philosophy and Life in the Light of Modern Thought (1912)
- Germany of to-day. by George Stuart Fullerton, Ph. D. LL.D. Professor of Philosophy in Columbia University, New York. Honorary Professor in the University of Vienna. First American Exchange Professor in Austria. Publisher: The Bobbs-Merrill Company Indianapolis, 1915
- A Handbook of Ethical Theory (1922) A Handbook of Ethical Theory. Reprint. Publisher: CreateSpace Independent Publishing Platform; 1 edition (September 2, 2013) ISBN 978-1-4923-1845-3
