= Fatehgarh =

Fatehgarh Cantt
- Town
- Location in Uttar Pradesh, India
- Coordinates: 27.37°N 79.63°E
- Country: India
- State: Uttar Pradesh
- District: Farrukhabad

Government
  - Type: Cantonment Board
  - Body: Cantonment Board

Area
  - Town: 28.86 km^{2} (11.14 sq mi)
- Elevation: 138 m (453 ft)

Population (2011)
  - Town: 276,581
  - Density: 350/km^{2} (910/sq mi)
  - Metro: 552,335

Languages
  - Official: Hindi
- Time zone: UTC+5:30 (IST)
- PIN: 209601
- Telephone code: 05692
- Vehicle registration: UP 76
- Sex ratio: 842/1000 ♂/♀

Fatehgarh is a cantonment town in Farrukhabad district in the state of Uttar Pradesh, India. Located on the south bank of the Ganges River, it is the administrative headquarters of Farrukhabad District. Fatehgarh derives its name from an old fort. It is a small city with no significant industrial activity. Asia's largest potato market is located in Farrukhabad. It contains a large Indian Army establishment in the form of the Rajput Regimental Centre, 114 Infantry Battalion TA and the Sikh Light Infantry Center.

== Demographics ==
As per provisional data of 2011 census, Farrukhabad-cum-Fategarh urban agglomeration had a population of 290,540, out of which males were 154,630 and females were 135,910. The literacy rate was 75.60 per cent.

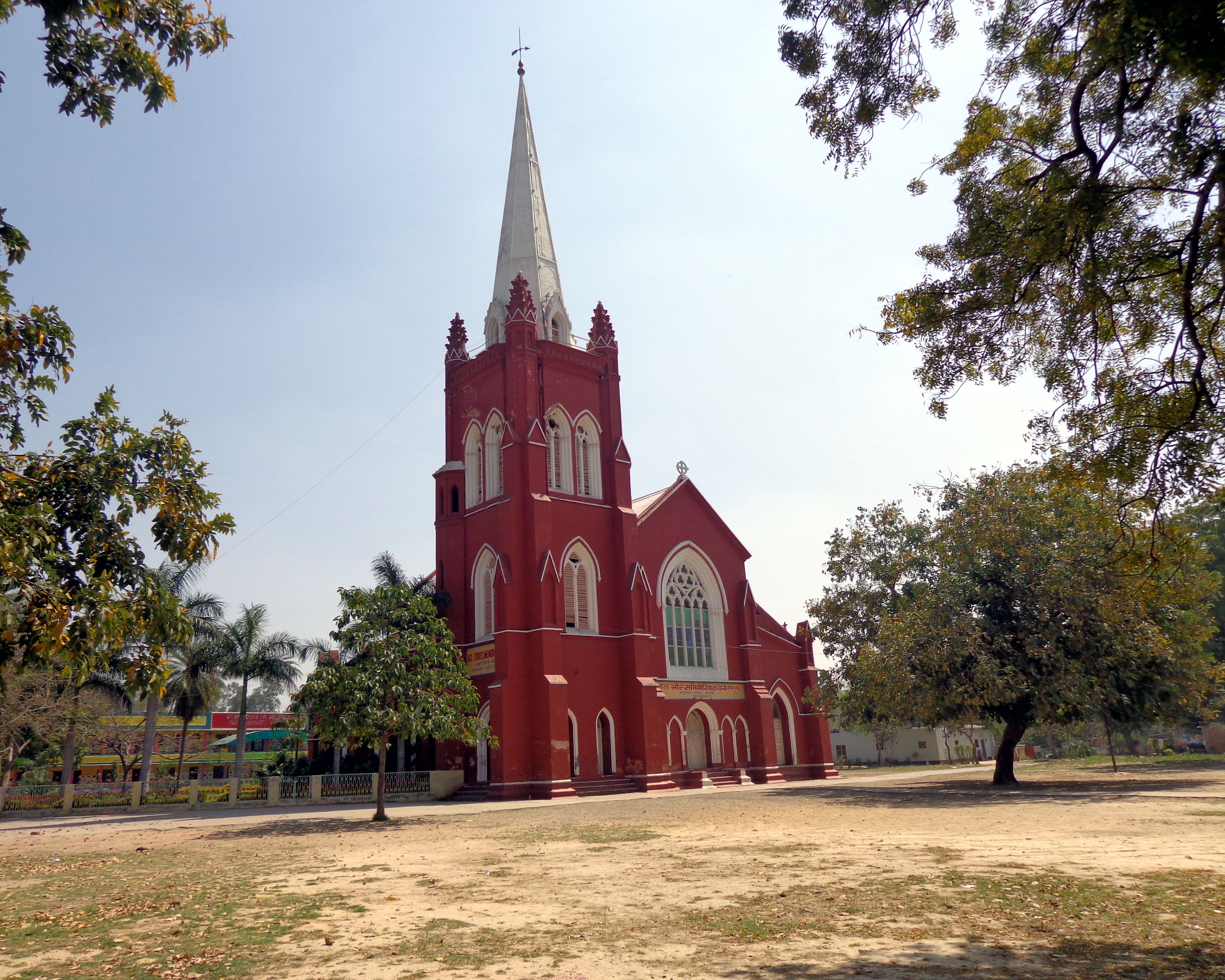
The All Souls Memorial Church in Fatehgarh

As of 2001 India census, Fatehgarh had a population of 14,682, males constituting 60% of the population and females 40%. Fatehgarh has an average literacy rate of 76%, higher than the national average of 59.5%: male literacy is 83%, and female literacy is 65%. In Fatehgarh, 12% of the population is under 6 years of age.

== Climate ==
Climate data for Fatehgarh (1991–2020)
Month	Jan	Feb	Mar	Apr	May	Jun	Jul	Aug	Sep	Oct	Nov	Dec	Year
Record high °C (°F)	30.1 (86.2)	34.9 (94.8)	39.7 (103.5)	43.1 (109.6)	47.7 (117.9)	48.8 (119.8)	44.7 (112.5)	39.8 (103.6)	38.9 (102.0)	39.4 (102.9)	34.7 (94.5)	36.4 (97.5)	48.8 (119.8)
Mean daily maximum °C (°F)	20.1 (68.2)	24.6 (76.3)	31.1 (88.0)	37.5 (99.5)	40.5 (104.9)	39.7 (103.5)	34.9 (94.8)	33.6 (92.5)	33.3 (91.9)	32.4 (90.3)	28.8 (83.8)	23.0 (73.4)	31.7 (89.1)
Mean daily minimum °C (°F)	7.0 (44.6)	10.3 (50.5)	14.5 (58.1)	19.2 (66.6)	22.7 (72.9)	23.8 (74.8)	23.3 (73.9)	23.0 (73.4)	22.2 (72.0)	18.6 (65.5)	13.5 (56.3)	8.6 (47.5)	17.3 (63.1)
Record low °C (°F)	2.1 (35.8)	3.7 (38.7)	6.2 (43.2)	11.5 (52.7)	12.6 (54.7)	13.6 (56.5)	13.1 (55.6)	13.7 (56.7)	12.8 (55.0)	11.9 (53.4)	7.5 (45.5)	2.1 (35.8)	2.1 (35.8)
Average rainfall mm (inches)	9.9 (0.39)	13.0 (0.51)	9.0 (0.35)	6.1 (0.24)	17.6 (0.69)	63.4 (2.50)	170.4 (6.71)	167.1 (6.58)	137.0 (5.39)	31.4 (1.24)	1.4 (0.06)	5.0 (0.20)	631.2 (24.85)
Average rainy days	1.0	1.2	0.7	0.6	1.3	3.3	8.3	8.2	5.9	1.1	0.2	0.5	32.3
Average relative humidity (%) (at 17:30 IST)	67	59	49	37	39	49	70	74	72	61	55	62	58
Source: India Meteorological Department

== Notable people ==
- Sri Ram Chandra of Fatehargh (Adi guru of Sri Ram Chandra Mission)Ram Chandra (Lalaji) (2 February 1873 – 14 August 1931)
- Mriganka Sur (born 1953), neuroscientist
- Ali Ahmed Fazeel, Attorney General
- George Stuart Fullerton, psychologist
- Anna Martha Fullerton, physician
- Rear-Admiral Spencer Login, C.V.O., Royal Navy (1851–1909), rugby union international who represented England in 1875
