= Gangwar =

Gangwar may refer to:

- Gangwar (social group), a sub-caste native to northern India
- Bhagwat Saran Gangwar, Indian politician from Samajwadi Party
- Chetram Gangwar, Indian politician from Indian National Congress
- Harish Kumar Gangawar, Indian politician from Indian National Congress
- Kuldeep Singh Gangwar, Indian politician from Bahujan Samaj Party
- Parshuram Gangwar, Indian politician from Bharatiya Janata Party
- Santosh Gangwar, Indian politician from Bharatiya Janata Party
- Siyaram Gangwar, Indian politician from Indian National Congress
- Kesar Singh, Indian politician from Bhartiya Janta Party

== See also ==
- Gang war (disambiguation)
- Gangwal, an Indian surname
