= Masud Husain Khan =

Indian linguist (1919–2010)

- Born: 28 January 1919; Kaimganj, United Provinces of Agra and Oudh, British India
- Died: 16 October 2010 (aged 91); Aligarh, Uttar Pradesh, India
- Education: Zakir Husain Delhi College, University of Delhi, Aligarh Muslim University
- Organization(s): Zakir Husain Delhi College; Aligarh Muslim University, Jamia Millia Islamia, Osmania University, Kashmir University, University of California, Berkeley, Anjuman-i Taraqqi-i Urdu, All India Muslim Education Conference, Khuda Bakhsh Oriental Library
- Notable work: Iqbal Ki Nazari-o-Amali Sheriyat, Muqaddama-e-Tareekh-e-Zaban-e-Urdu, Urdu Zaban-o-Adab, Do Neem, Roop Bengal, Urdu Lafz ka Sautiyati aur Tajz-e-Sautiyati Mutala, Muhammad Quli Qutb Shah, Yusuf Husain Khan, Wurood-e-Masood.
- Spouse: Najma Begum
- Relatives: Zakir Husain, Yousuf Hussain Khan, Mahmud Hussain, Gulam Rabbani Taban, Khurshed Alam Khan, Salman Khurshid, Anusha Rizvi, General Rahimuddin Khan, Ijaz-ul-Haq, Mahmood Farooqui, Haroon Khan Sherwani, Rahil Begum Sherwani
- Awards: Sahitya Akademi Award, Kul Hind Bahadur Shah Zafar Award, Ghalib Award, Karachi Niaz Fatehpuri Award

Masud Husain Khan (28 January 1919 – 16 October 2010) was an Indian linguist known for his contributions to Urdu literature and history.

He the first Professor Emeritus in Social Sciences at Aligarh Muslim University. He also served as fifth Vice-Chancellor of Jamia Millia Islamia, a Central University in New Delhi.

On 16 October 2010 Masud Husain Khan died in Aligarh from Parkinson's disease.

== Family ==
Masud Husain Khan was born in Qaimganj district Farrukhabad, into a Pashtun family of the Afridi and Kheshgi tribe of Uttar Pradesh. His family is sometimes referred to as the Family of Vice-Chancellors, having provided Vice-chancellors to four different universities across the Indian subcontinent.

Masud Husain's father Muzaffar Husain Khan (1893–1921) completed his education at Islamia High School Etawah and Mohammadan Anglo Oriental (M.A.O.) College, Aligarh. He started his judicial career in Hyderabad but died of tuberculosis at the early age of 28; Masud Husain was just two years old. Muzaffar Husain Khan was eldest brother of-

- Zakir Husain, the third President of India. He was awarded the Bharat Ratna, India's highest national honour (1963). Zakir Husain also served as Vice-Chancellor of Jamia Millia Islamia and Aligarh Muslim University.
- Yousuf Husain Khan, professor at Osmania University Hyderabad and Urdu's critic who later became Pro-vice-chancellor at Aligarh Muslim University. He was awarded the Sahitya Academy Award in 1978.
- Mahmud Husain Khan, who was appointed both Minister of State for Defense and Minister of State for Foreign Affairs and Commonwealth Relations in the cabinet of Prime Minister Liaquat Ali Khan, before becoming State Minister for State and Frontier Regions a year later. In 1951, he was appointed Minister for Kashmir Affairs in Liaquat's cabinet, and then served as Minister for Education from 1952 to 1953. He served as Vice-Chancellor of Dhaka University from 1960 to 1963, and of Karachi University from 1971 until his death in 1975. He was the father of Anwar Hussain, former managing director of Pakistan Television Corporation. Mahmud Husain's daughter, Saqiba, is married to General Rahimuddin Khan, the Chairman Joint Chiefs of Staff Committee of the Pakistan Army and the longest-serving Governor of Balochistan. Rahimuddin Khan later served as Governor of Sindh in 1988. Saqiba and Rahimuddin Khan's son-in-law is Ijaz-ul-Haq, son of General Zia-ul-Haq, the sixth President of Pakistan.

Masud Husain's mother, Fatima Begum was eldest sister of-

- Sultan Alam Khan, member of the First and the Second Uttar Pradesh Legislative Assembly, representing the constituency of Kaimganj. He was also a state minister in the Sampurnanand Government. His grandson Shakeel Ahmad married the widow of Shabbir Sharif, the most decorated officer of Pakistan Army and elder brother of Chief of Army Staff of Pakistan General Raheel Sharif.
- Quddus Alam Khan, Zamindar of Kaimganj and also Masud Husain's father-in-law. Quddus Alam's wife and Masud Husain's mother-in-law, Badrud-duja Begum, was the daughter of Nawab Muhammad Yusuf Khan Sherwani of Datawali and Budhansi. Badrud-duja Begum's paternal grandfather, Nawab Faiz Ahmed Khan Sherwani of Datawali, gave a financial assistance of Rs. 50,000/- to Sultan Abdul Hamid II of the Ottoman Empire during the Russo-Turkish War (1877-78), for which Nawab Faiz Ahmed Khan was granted a salute of 8-guns. Masud Husain was also related through marriage to Haroon Khan Sherwani, Rahil Begum Sherwani, Nawab Sir Muhammad Muzammilullah Khan of Bhikampur, Zahida Khatun Sherwani, and the Nawabs of Malerkotla, Kurwai and Dujana
- Gulam Rabbani Taban, a poet and member of the Progressive Writers' Association. He received the Sahitya Akademi award in 1979. He was honoured by the Government of India in 1971 with Padma Shri, the fourth highest Indian civilian award. He is the grandfather of filmmakers Anusha Rizvi and Syed Ahmad Afzal.
- Khurshed Alam Khan, former Indian Minister of State for External Affairs in Government of India. He was Governor of Karnataka from 1991 to 1999 and Governor of Goa from 1989 to 1991. He has also officiated as Governor of Kerala. He was the Chancellor of Jamia Millia Islamia from 1985 to 1990, and from 1995 to 2001. He married Sayeeda Begum, daughter of Dr. Zakir Husain. Salman Khurshid, former Indian Minister of External Affairs, is their son.

== Education ==
After finishing primary education at Jamia Millia Islamia, Husain studied in Dhaka for a time. He completed his BA at Zakir Husain College, Delhi University and MA at Aligarh Muslim University. His PhD was directed under Professor Rasheed Ahmad Siddiqui, culminating in his published magnum opus Muqaddama-e-tareekh-e-zaban-e-Urdu. He also studied Hindi and Sanskrit literature and was familiar with Bengali, Persian and French. Later in 1953 he finished his DLitt at University of Paris in Linguistics.

== Career ==
Husain served as visiting professor at Department of South Asian Studies, University of California, Berkeley, USA. In 1962, he became chairman at Osmania University's Urdu department where he served till 1968 when he was made the head of the linguistics department at Aligarh Muslim University. He was Anjuman-i Taraqqi-i Urdu Hind's acting general secretary during 1969–1970. From 3 November 1973 to 15 August 1978 he served Delhi's Jamia Millia Islamia as vice-chancellor. After his retirement, Husain was appointed as visiting professor at Iqbal Institute, Kashmir University, Srinagar and used to teach research methodology. Masud Husain was also the vice-chancellor of Jamia Urdu Aligarh until the mid-1990s. Jamia Urdu, Aligarh was established as a distance education institution in 1939 for imparting Urdu education. He was the president of All India Muslim Educational Conference until his death in 2010. He was a member of the executive board of Khuda Bakhsh Oriental Library.

== Works ==
Hussein's works include:

- Husain's magnum opus, Muqaddama-e-tareekh-e-zaban-e-Urdu, describes in detail the history of Urdu's origin and development. On account of coherence and plausibility, the book is considered to offer one of the most acceptable theories on the genesis and development of Urdu. He proved his theory with historical evidence, taking into account the formation of Indo-Aryan languages. Keeping in view the theories of historical linguistics and ancient sources, he proved that Urdu was born in and around Delhi. According to him, four vernacular dialects, namely Braj Bhasha, Mewati, Haryanvi and Khariboli, exerted their influences on Urdu during its long formative phases and among them Haryanvi and Khariboli were the ones that proved to be more decisive. Later, the same language reached Deccan in the 13th and 14th centuries AD with the Muslim armies and slowly gained refinement over the centuries and a standard Urdu language emerged. Before Masud Husain, Muhammad Husain Azad, Hafiz Mehmood Khan Shirani, Sayyid Shamsullah Qadri, Mohiuddin Qadri Zore, Syed Sulaiman Nadvi, T. Grahame Bailey and some other scholars had presented their theories on Urdu's origin but none found favour with Masud Husain. In his opinion, the emergence of these modern Indo-Aryan dialects could not have begun earlier than 1000 AD and, therefore, Hafiz Mehmood Shirani's theory that saw the Punjab region as the cradle of Urdu and premised that Urdu was a language that was brought to Delhi by Muslim armies after the conquest of Punjab, was not plausible. First published in 1948, the book, originally his PhD dissertation, has run into many editions in India and Pakistan.
- His second book Urdu Zaban-o-Adab written in 1954 was equally popular.
- Husain was the first to analyse the words of Urdu from the phonetic and phonological point of view. During his stay in London, Husain had a chance to benefit from the insights of Professor J. R. Firth who was the first to introduce the concept of 'Prosodic Phonology'. Basing his D.Litt. thesis A phonetic and phonological study of the word in Urdu on Firth's theory, he carried out research that was published in 1954. It was translated into Urdu by Professor Mirza Khalil Ahmad Beg under the title Urdu Lafz ka Sautiyati aur Tajz-sautiyati Mutalia, and was published by the Department of Linguistics, Aligarh Muslim University, Aligarh in 1984.
- Another sphere of Husain's scholarly interest was Literary criticism but at the beginning of his literary career, he used to scoff at the then prevalent trend of criticism that indulged in flowery language and had become too rhetoric. The so-called 'impressionistic school of literary criticism' used to eulogise literary works in a way that reeked of romanticism and based evaluation on subjectivity rather than on any literary theory. Stylistics (field of study), in Urdu called Uslubiyat, is a significant branch of Applied linguistics. During his stay in the US, he was inspired by the theory of stylistics presented by Professor Archibald A. Hill. He then began applying linguistics to Urdu literary criticism and wrote many articles on Ghalib, Muhammad Iqbal and Fani Badayuni, not only presenting the linguistic critical analysis of their poetry but also laying the foundations for what came to be known as Linguistic Criticism in Urdu which later served as a launching pad for other well-known Urdu critics such as Gopi Chand Narang, Mughni Tabassum and Mirza Khalil Ahmad Beg.
- His assertion that Prem Chand's Urdu novel Godaan is not Prem Chand's original work in Urdu but a translation of Prem Chand's Hindi novel by the same title and that it was rendered into Urdu by Iqbal Bahadur Varma Sahar took the literary world by storm. Many doubted Husain's intentions. Manik Toula, a Prem Chand scholar, said Husain was trying to 'disown' Chand as an Urdu writer. Even a scholar of Gian Chand Jain's stature accused Husain of 'literary Jihad'. But the evidence brought to light by Husain was so genuine that it had to be accepted that the Urdu rendering of Godaan began only after Prem Chand's death.
- Husain commands respect of Urdu researchers when it comes to editing classical Urdu texts. Aside from other rare manuscripts discovered and edited by Husain, Qissa-e-Mahr Afroz-o-Dilbar, edited and annotated by him, is a work that brought to light an important rare 'daastaan'.
- He had a rare insight into Dakhini and Dakhiniyat. He calls the Dakhini Dialect of Urdu 'the Old Urdu'. A work of his on Dakhini is the compilation and publication of a Dakhini Urdu dictionary that has been compiled on the basis of a large number of rare and unpublished manuscripts, citing the couplets of Dakhini along with the words and meanings.
- In his monograph on Muhammad Quli Qutb Shah, Husain re-evaluated the poetry of Quli Qutb Shah for the benefit of the Urdu readers.
- He has a large number of books to his credit, including his autobiography Wurood-e-Masood and the collection of his poetry Do Neem, all of which are considered as valuable contribution to Urdu prose and linguistics.
- In his brief stay of almost one and a quarter-year at Iqbal Institute, he published several papers of Allama Iqbal and his poetry in different journals including Iqbaaliyaat, the journal of Iqbal Institute Kashmir University.
- He was also the Chief Editor of Urdu-Urdu Lughat.
- When he came to Pakistan in the early 1980s, the Urdu Dictionary Board consulted him on their flagship dictionary.

== Awards and honours ==
- It was at Iqbal Institute where he finished his book Iqbal Ki Nazari-o-Amali Sheriyat (Criticism) for which Husain received Sahitya Akademi award in 1984.
- He was conferred with Delhi Urdu Academy's highest honour – Kul Hind Bahadur Shah Zafar Award—in recognition of his contribution to the study of Urdu language and literature in March 2010.
- In February 2010 Ghalib Institute, New Delhi felicitated him in a grand function for his yeoman contribution to Urdu language and literature.
- He was granted the designation of "Professor Emeritus" by the Aligarh Muslim University in 1987, the first in Social Sciences.
- He was also awarded the Karachi Niaz Fatehpuri Award in 1986.
- Besides, he was given Uttar Pradesh Urdu Academy Award on his book Urdu ka Alamia in 1974. This book was edited by Professor Mirza Khalil Ahmad Beg.
- A felicitation volume Nazr-e-Masud (edited by Professor Mirza Khalil Ahmad Beg) was presented to him on his 70th Birth Anniversary in 1989 in a function held at Jamia Urdu, Aligarh.
- After his death (16 October 2010), Professor Mirza Khalil Ahmad Beg wrote a book titled Masud Husain Khan: ahwal-o-aasar to commemorate his 5th death anniversary. This book was published by Educational Publishing House, Delhi in 2015.
- A critical essay named Masud Hussain Khan: Modern Linguistic Perspective (Masud Hussain Khan: Jadeed Lisani Tanazur) was written by Muhammad Usman Butt highlights his contributions in the field of modern Urdu Linguistics.

== See also ==
- List of Indian writers
