= Kaimganj =

Town in Uttar Pradesh, India

Kaimganj Qaimganj
- Town
- Location in Uttar Pradesh, India
- Coordinates: 27.57°N 79.35°E
- Country: India
- State: Uttar Pradesh
- District: Farrukhabad
- Elevation: 147 m (482 ft)

Population (2011)
  - Total: 31,150
  - Density: 435/km^{2} (1,130/sq mi)

Languages
  - Official: Hindi, Urdu
- Time zone: UTC+5:30 (IST)
- PIN: 209502
- Telephone code: 05690
- Vehicle registration: UP-76
- Sex ratio: 848 ♂/♀

Kaimganj also referred to as Qaimganj, is a town and Nagar Palika Parishad in Farrukhabad district in the Indian state of Uttar Pradesh. Kaimganj Railway Station is a major station between Farrukhabad and Kasganj on the Rajputana railway link of the North Eastern Railway.

== Description ==
Kaimganj is just 10 km from the ancient city of Kampil (ancient Kampilya) on the left bank of the great river Ganges in Farrukhabad district. The town was founded by the Nawab Mohammad Khan Bangash in 1713 and named Qaimganj (क़ायमगंज) after his son Qaim Khan, who was also the first administrator of this town. The word Qaim (क़ायम) means "upright" and the meaning of the word Ganj (गंज) is market place.

This town is also associated with Dhruva, Draupadi and Charak. The famous book on Ayurveda, Charaka Samhita was also written in the same town. The town has an ancient grand JAMA masjid whose foundation was laid by omar Daraz khan aka Munnu Khan and also the land was given by Minda Khan who was a zamindar and a well-known figure in Kaimganj.

This town is the birthplace of Dr. Zakir Hussain, the third President of India from 13 May 1967 until his death on 3 May 1969, and the founder of Jamia Millia Islamia. It is also the birthplace of the Pakistan Army's General Rahimuddin Khan, who was also Balochistan's longest-serving governor, Gulam Rabbani Khan Taban, a well-known poet, and Syed Abdul Salam Shah, an Indian politician belonging to the Indian National Congress (INC). A well-known freedom fighter Syed Kabir Shah also Known as Khair Shah, was a legendary hero of Kaimganj who was famous for his justice for poor, Khair Shah was a friend of Lohiya Who helped him establish a political party National Socialistic Party also known as Lal Topi he also helped former Chief Minister of Uttar Pradesh Mulayam Singh Yadav in making his political career. This place is well known for the hospitality of Afridi Pathans.Some of specific locality (Mohalla) belong to Afridi Pathans are Kazam Khan,Kalakhel, Subhanpur, Pitoura, Ayyapur,Raipur, Ataipur, etc. Many Other Pathan's tribe such as Yusufzai, Toe, sheikh etc also live in kaimganj.

=== Climate ===
The climate of the district is characterized by a hot dry summer and a pleasant cold season.

=== Geography ===
Kaimganj is located at 27.57°N 79.35°E. It has an average elevation of 144 meters (472 feet).

== Demographics ==
As of 2011 India census, Kaimganj had a population of 31,150. Males constitute 53.20% of the population and females 46.8%. Kaimganj has an average literacy rate of 64%, higher than the national average of 59.5%: male literacy is 68%, and female literacy is 58%. In Kaimganj, 15% of the population is under 6 years of age.

=== Economy ===
The city is well known for its chewing tobacco and sugar mill. The tobacco cultivated in Kaimganj is cured by the sun and contains good amounts of nicotine. The tobacco is crushed into various sizes. A large range of different qualities are available. Tobacco is supplied to all the leading chewing tobacco manufacturers. The total turn over of the city is over seven crore per day, which includes internal and external trade. Kaimganj is the largest raw tobacco producer in Northern India, and is also the home town of KAKA Industries, Bandar dholak, Moni Sada and B.K.Tobacco company.

Besides the tobacco business, the city is also a potato hub and exports potatoes to nearly all of India from Jammu & Kashmir to Tamil Nadu and Gujarat to Assam.

There is also a famous Sugar Mill of U.P. at Kaimganj established by Mr. Sultan Alam Khan (inaugurated by Mrs. Indira Gandhi) which crushes a large amount of sugarcane.

== Education ==
SNM Inter College is the oldest educational institution in 1905. Earlier it was called George AV School and it was up to class VIII only, which was founded by Pandit Pyarelal Chaturvedi. Later, it was upgraded to class XII by Pyarelal Chaturvedi's son Pandit Daya Shankar Chaturvedi in 1952 . After 20 years in 1972, Pandit Pramod Chandra Chaturvedi, younger brother of Daya Shankar Chaturvedi started Laxmi Yadunandan Degree College in the adjacent land to S N M Iinter College. C.P.Vidya Niketan (affiliated to C.I.S.C.E, New Delhi), a co-educational public school established in the year 1991 under the aegis of C.P. Vidya Niketan Educational Society. Sultan Alam Memorial School Established by Janab Khursheed Ali Khan way back early 70s is now C.B.S.E. school from World-famous international group of schools in the town. Lyall Montessori School, The only English Medium School of that time was Established by a Great Educationist and Iron Lady Mrs. Promila Lyall Zaki in early 80s at Railway Road, opposite Kaimganj Railway Station. In olden days Kaimganj was also famous in nearby areas for religious preachings by Sufi saints and Maulvies.. Old and Famous co-educational Islamic school 'Madarsa Arabia Talim-ul- Islam' established by Janab Alah Bakhsh at Chhapatti, Chilanka serves the religious & modern educations up to 5th standard for Muslim students of the town since 70s. Madarsa Islamia Faiz-e-Aam (MIFA), Hamirpur, Lalbagh was Established by few Noble and farsighted Intellectuals like, Janab Hakim Hameedullah Khan, Mr. Usman Munshi ji, Mr. Basheer Munshi Ji, Mr. Mashkoor Ullah Khan (Pradhan), Mr. Haseeb Ullah Khan, Mr. Mohd. Shakeel Khan, Mr. Mohd. Faheem Khan (Care Taker/ Manager) are few to cater Islamic and Modern education among underprivileged since 1973. Now MIFA is well Established School in the Town. MIFA has around 800 students both boys and girls, with well furnished computer lab. and up to High School affiliated to U.P. Board of Madarsa Education, Lucknow. MIFA is providing computer education to its students since 2005. MIFA is only School of its kind that provide education to underprivileged on a meager amount. MIFA is unaided and raises finance from its founder members. Shah Public School (now HO Academy), Mau Public School, C. P. Vidya Niketan and kiran public schools are famous English medium schools of the town. There are also four-degree colleges Viz. Vidya Mandir degree college, L Y degree college, Shakunatala Devi Mahila Degree College, Dr. Ramnaryan Mahila Degree College. There is a famous social and educational research society named Educare Institute of technical and social development situated at Pathak street. the oldest computer center of the town, Educare computer institute is running under this society. There are also two ITI which provides vocational skill to local youth Viz. Pratap Pvt ITI and Ramswaroop ITI at bakhtorpur. Recently a new English medium school started in year 2013 named AP Public school which is affiliated to CBSE Board promoted by the family of local business tycoon Late Shyam Bihari Rastogi. This is situated on Kampil road.

== History of the town ==
In 1748 Muhammad Shah was succeeded by his son Ahmad Shah, who shortly afterwards was appointed Safdar Jang. The Durrani invasions of Nadir Shah in 1739 and Ahmad Shah Durrani in 1748 had severely shaken the stability of the central government, and given to the provincial governors a dangerous degree of power. One of the most influential of these was Ali Muhammad in Rohilkhand, and the new wajir, who had already quarrelled with him, looked with apprehension on his growing prestige. With Qaim Khan, the son of Muhammad Khan, he had also a hereditary feud, and he determined to set his two enemies at one another's throats, being certain to be himself the gainer whatever the event. Accordingly, on the death od Ali Muhammad in 1749, after an abortive attempt to overthrow his successor by other means, an imperial farman was issued to Qaim Khan conferring on him the mahals of Bareilly and Moradabad wrongfully usurped by Sadullah Khan, the son of Ali Muhammad.

Qaim Khan fell into the trap laid for him and set out to the conquest of his new territories with a large force. At Qadirganj on the Ganges in the Kasganj district, he was defeated by the Rohillas under Hafiz Rahmat Khan and killed. Safdar Jang at ones attempted to seize Farrukhabad and the other Bangash parganas, but Ahmad Khan, the son of Qaim Khan, collected his adherents and in 1750 defeated the Wajir General Nawab Rae at Khuaganj, and the Wajit soon afterwards near Patiali. Had the ambition and enterprise of Ahmad Khan been equal to his personal courage there is little doubt that he might now have pushed on to Delhi and made himself master of the Emperors person and virtual sovereign. He was, however, far too easy-going in disposition to embark on such a scheme and contented himself with the recovery of his family, former territories and the recognition of his title to them from the Emperor. The administration of the various parganas was given to his brothers and relations, Shikohabad, which included Sakit, Kuraoli and Alikhera, going to Azim Khan, and Bhongaon and Bewar to the Majhle Nawab, Shadi Khan was sent to occupy Kora, but was opposed and defeated by Ali Quli Khan, the deputy in the Allahabad Subah. Ahmad Khans reluctance to move was overcome by the insistence of his counselors and he was persuaded to advance on Allahabad in person. While he was besieging that town the wajir had had time to recover from his defeat and had called in the Marathas to his assistance.

The approach of the united armies towards Farrukhabad obliged Ahmad Khan to raise the siege of Allahabad, and after some discussion he decided to return to protect his own home. But the discouragement produced by this retreat proved too much for his mercenaries and they melted away until when he reached Fatehgarh he had too small a force to attempt to do more than hold the fort. After a month's siege a Rohilla army under Sadullah Khan and Bahadur Khan came down to his assistance, but was defeated by the Marathas, and Ahmad Khan then fled through Rohilkhand to Kumaon, where he remained till 1752, when a fresh invasion of India by Ahmad Shah Durrani made Safdar Jang and the Marathas anxious for pease. It was agreed that Rohilkhand and Farrukhabad should be evacuated on condition that Ahmad Khan took over the debt of thirty lakhs of rupees due from Safdar Jang to the Marathas as pay for their services, ceding as security for the debt sixteen and a half of the thirty three mahals comprised in his territories. The management of the whole remained in the hands of Ahmad Khan, who paid the surplus revenue, after deducting the cost of management and the pay of the troops, to two Marathas agents stationed at Kanauj and Aliganj. Payments continued to be made till the battle of Panipat in 1761 when the Marathas left Doab.

== 1751–1761 ==
It was the most important period in the history when Maratha forces advance in the North and expanded the Empire to the Natural Dimensions of the country. Malharrao Holkar, Jayappa Scindia, Gangadhar Tatya, Tukojirao Holkar, Khanderao Holkar went to help Safdarjung against Shadulla Khan, Ahmed Khan Bangash, Mohamud Khan, Bahadur Khan Rohilla as per the directions of Peshwa Balaji Bajirao. In the Battle of Fategarh and Farrukhabad, they defeated the Rohillas and Bangash (March 1751 – April 1752).

As result of this battle, Rohillas were compelled to pay a compensation amount of 3 million Rupees along with an annual tribute. The amount of tribute was half of the total collections from 33 Mahals of Rohilkhand and Farrukhabad. Rohillas were also forced to pay the total expenses for the management of the troops for Gangwar and Katiyar Maratha sardars stationed at Aliganj and Kannauj respectively. Ahmad Khan continued to pay the amount till the third battle of Panipat in 1761, when the Marathas left Doab.

=== Contemporary History, Developments and Concerns ===
Kaimganj possesses the honour of being ancestral town of Late Dr. Zakir Hussain, Former President of Republic of India. Syed Abdul Salam Shah, a freedom fighter who actively participated in Non-cooperation Movement (Asahiyog Andolan) led by Mohandas Karamchand Gandhi in 1921-1922 and Quit India Movement in 1942. He was also a prominent political figure belonging to Indian National Congress. The very famous poet and progressive writer of his time Late Ghulam Rabbani Taban, and eminent linguist and the 5th Vice Chancellor of Jamia Millia Islamia, Professor Emeritus Masud Husain Khan were from this place. Dr Shah Alam Khan, Professor of Orthopaedics at the All India Institute of Medical Sciences, New Delhi hails from Kaimganj. His references in Orthopaedic literature are well quoted. Dr. Abdul Salam Khan (elder son of famous Hakeem Abdul Hai Khan) settled in Germany as Scientist and also serving as Managing Director Indo-German Liaison Office (IGLO) and younger son Dr. Abdul Kalam Khan settled in Lucknow and retired from Department of Medical Health and Education Uttar Pradesh Government as Deputy Director. Kaimganj has emerged as a major developed town in the region on infrastructural, economical, educational parts. Mr Salman Khursheed, Union State Minister for Company Affairs also hails from Kaimganj.

The major concern in the town today is the ambivalent tobacco industry. No Doubt tobacco industry has contributed a lot in the development of the town – by generating numerous employment opportunities for the poor and rich equally, and thus adding to the prosperity of the town. However, a large increase in the tobacco cultivation and processing in the various godowns located in the city's residential premises is adding to the health hazards of the residents. The symptoms of asthma, tuberculosis and other respiratory malfunctions are evident in the people who work in tobacco processing industry and also among the common citizens. Now the godowns are moved away from the city to make life better for common people

== Notable people ==
- Siyaram Gangwar
