= 1924 New Year Honours =

British royal recognitions

The 1924 New Year Honours were appointments by King George V to various orders and honours to reward and highlight good works by members of the British Empire. They were published in The London Gazette on 1 January 1924.

The recipients of honours are displayed here as they were styled before their new honour, and arranged by honour, with classes (Knight, Knight Grand Cross, etc.) and then divisions (Military, Civil, etc.) as appropriate.

== British Empire ==
=== Viscount ===
- James Lyle, Baron Inchcape, GCMG, KCSI, KCIE.

=== Baron ===
- The Right Honourable Sir Frederick George Banbury, Bt, MP.
- The Right Honourable Sir Charles John Darling.
- Colonel Sir Herbert Merton Jessel, Bt, CB, CMG.

=== Privy Councillor ===
- The Honourable Henry Burton, KC, Minister of Finance, Union of South Africa.
- Frederick Henry, Baron Colwyn.
- Sir George Ambrose Lloyd, GCIE, DSO.
- Ronald John McNeill, MP, Under-Secretary of State for Foreign Affairs since October 1922.
- Major Edward, Earl Winterton, MP, Under-Secretary of State for India since October 1922.

=== Baronet ===
- Henry Strother Cautley, KG, JP, MP.
- Major Herbert Robin Cayzer, JP, MP.
- Sir Thomas Willes Chitty, Senior Master of the King's Bench Division and King's Remembrancer.
- Gilbert Wheaton Fox, JP.
- Sir Donald MacAlister, KCB, , FRCP, FRSE, President of the General Medical Council.
- Sir John Paget Mellor, KCB, late His Majesty's Procurator General and Solicitor to the Treasury.
- John de Fonblanque Pennefather, MP.
- John Cecil Power, for Public Services.
- Sir Lewis Richardson, CBE, in recognition of services rendered to the Union of South Africa.
- Thomas Worsfold, , , JP, DL.

=== Knight Bachelor ===
- Ernest King Allen, CBE, Assistant Public Trustee.
- Herbert Austin, Clerk of the Central Criminal Court.
- Alderman Albert Ball, JP.
- Henry William Russell Bencraft, LRCP (Edin), MRCS, JP.
- Colonel Joseph Alfred Bradney, CB, TD.
- Byrom Bramwell, MD, LLD, FRCP, FRSE, for services to Medicine.
- Leonard James Coates, a Member of the Liquidation Board.
- Archibald Craig, LLB, JP.
- Benjamin Scaife Gott, for services to Education.
- Walter Lawrence, JP.
- Thomas Harry Mottram, CBE, His Majesty's Chief Inspector of Mines, Mines Department, Board of Trade.
- Hugh Murray, CIE, CBE, JP, Assistant Forestry Commissioner of England and Wales.
- William George Rice, JP.
- Charles Claxton Sanderson, Controller of the London Postal Service.
- Robert Forsyth Scott, MA, LLD.
- William George Turner, Alderman, Lord Mayor of Belfast.
- Arthur Watson, CBE, LLD, General Manager of the London, Midland & Scottish Railway.
- Richard White, Chief Master of the Supreme Court, Chancery Division.
- Alderman John Frederick Winnicott, JP.
- Fredric Wise, JP, DL, MP.

India

- Lieutenant-Colonel Denys Brooke Blakeway, CIE, Agent to the Governor-General, Central India.
- Rao Bahadur Annepu Parasuramadas Patro Garu, Minister for Education, Madras.
- Khan Bahadur Saiyed Muhammad Fakhruddin, Minister for Education, Bihar and Orissa.
- Charles Lennox Somerville Russell, Indian Civil Service, Resident at Hyderabad.
- Mr. Justice Calamur Viravalli Kumaraswami Sastriyar, Diwan Bahadur, Puisne Judge of the High Court of Judicature at Madras.
- Mr. Justice Amberson Barrington Marten, Puisne Judge of the High Court of Judicature at Bombay.
- Mr. Justice William Ewart Greaves, Puisne Judge of the High Court of Judicature at Fort William in Bengal.
- Dadiba Merwanji Dalal, CIE, High Commissioner for India in London.
- John Kaye Batten, Indian Civil Service, Judicial Commissioner, Central Provinces.
- Frank Nelson, Chairman of the Bombay Chamber of Commerce and of the Associated Chambers of Commerce of India and Ceylon, Member of the Bombay Legislative Council.
- John Ernest Jackson, CIE, Acting Agent of the Bombay, Baroda and Central India Railway.
- Willoughby Langer Carey, President, Bengal Chamber of Commerce, Member of the Bengal Legislative Council.
- George Anderson, CIE, Indian Educational Service, Director of Public Instruction, Punjab.
- Charles Morgan Webb, CIE, Indian Civil Service, Chairman, Development Trust, Rangoon, Burma.
- Harry George Waters, MRCS, LRCP, Principal Medical Officer, East Indian Railway.

Dominions, Colonies, Protectorates

- Lewis Cohen, Lord Mayor of the City of Adelaide, State of South Australia, in recognition of his services to Municipal Government.
- Henry Lindo Ferguson, CMG, MD, Dean of the Faculty of Medicine, Otago University, Dominion of New Zealand.
- John George Fraser, CMG, Government Agent, Western Province, Ceylon.
- David James Galloway, MD, Member of the Executive Council and of the Legislative Council of the Straits Settlements, in recognition of his public services.
- The Honourable John McWhae, Agent-General in London for the State of Victoria.
- The Honourable Arthur Mielziner Myers, formerly Minister of Customs and Munitions and for many years Member of the House of Representatives of New Zealand, in recognition of his public services.
- Sydney Charles King Farlow Nettleton, Chief Justice of the Bahamas.
- Joseph John Nunan, KC, LLD, Attorney-General of British Guiana.
- Lieutenant-Colonel William Thomas Prout, CMG, OBE, MB, one of the Medical Advisers to the Colonial Office.
- Robert Rutherford, Chairman of the West India Committee.
- Ronald Storrs, CMG, CBE, District Governor of Jerusalem.
- Herbert John Taylor, for services under the British South Africa Company's Administration of Southern Rhodesia, as Chief Native Commissioner.
- John Vicars, of the City of Sydney, in recognition of his services to the Commonwealth of Australia.

=== Order of the Bath ===
==== Knight Grand Cross of the Order of the Bath (GCB) ====
Military Division

- Air Chief Marshal Sir Hugh Montague Trenchard, Bt, KCB, DSO, ADC, Royal Air Force.

==== Knight Commander of the Order of the Bath (KCB) ====
Military Division

Royal Navy

- Rear-Admiral the Honourable Algernon Douglas Edward Harry Boyle, CB, CMG, MVO.
- Engineer Vice-Admiral Robert Bland Dixon, CB.

Army

- Lieutenant-General Sir Joseph John Asser, KCMG, KCVO, CB, Governor and Commander-in-Chief, Bermuda.
- Lieutenant-General Sir William Boog Leishman, KCMG, CB, FRS, MB, FRCP, FRFPS, KHP, Director-General, Army Medical Service.
- Major-General Sir James Marshall Stewart, KCMG, CB, Indian Army, retired pay.

Royal Air Force

- Air Vice Marshal Oliver Swann, CB, CBE.

Civil Division

- Colonel (Honorary Brigadier-General) William Bromley-Davenport, CB, CMG, CBE, DSO, TD, late Territorial Army Reserve (Honorary Colonel, the Staffordshire Yeomanry (Queen's Own Royal Regiment).

==== Companion of the Order of the Bath (CB) ====
Military Division

Royal Navy

- Rear-Admiral Percy Molyneux Rawson Royds, CMG.
- Rear-Admiral Percival Henry Hall-Thompson, CMG.
- Rear-Admiral Alexander Victor Campbell, DSO, MVO.
- Paymaster Commander Robert Archibald Morison Burridge.

Army

- Major-General Denis Joseph Collins, CMG, MD, KHS, Deputy Director of Medical Services, Southern Command, East Indies.
- Colonel George Peabody Scholfield, CMG, CBE, Deputy Chief Engineer, Southern Command.
- Colonel George Napier Johnston, CMG, DSO, Commanding Royal Artillery, 52nd (The Lowland) Division, Territorial Army.
- Colonel (temporary Colonel Commandant) Rowland Henry Mangles, CMG, DSO, Brigade Commander, Cairo Brigade, the British Troops in Egypt.
- Colonel Lewis Francis Philips, CMG, CBE, DSO, Brigade Commander, 128th (Hampshire) Infantry Brigade, Territorial Army.
- Colonel (temporary Colonel on the Staff) Henry Thomas Sawyer, DSO, Director of Veterinary Services, India Headquarters Staff, East Indies.
- Major-General Harry Ashley Vane Cummins, CMG, Indian Army, General Officer Commanding, Bombay District, East Indies.
- Colonel (temporary Colonel Commandant) William Frank Bainbridge, CMG, CBE, DSO, Indian Army, Commander, Jullundur Brigade Area, Northern Command, East Indies.
- Colonel Arthur Holroyd Bridges, CIE, DSO, Indian Army, General Staff Officer, 1st Grade, General Staff, Rawalpindi District, East Indies.

Royal Air Force

- Air Commodore David Munro, CIE, MB, MA, FECS (Edin), Royal Air Force Medical Services.

Civil Division

- Engineer Captain Francis Evans Percy Haigh, Royal Navy (Retd.)
- Colonel Commandant Picton Phillips, CMG, MVO, ADC, Royal Marines.
- Instructor Captain John White, MA, Royal Navy.
- Edward Rodolph Forber, CBE, Principal Assistant Secretary, Ministry of Health.
- Roland Venables Vernon, Assistant Secretary, Middle East Department, Colonial Office.
- William Young, Commissioner of Customs and Excise.

=== Order of the Star of India ===
==== Knight Grand Commander of the Order of the Star of India (GCSI) ====
- General Henry Seymour, Baron Rawlinson of Trent, GCB GCVO KCMG, Commander-in-Chief in India.

==== Knight Commander of the Order of the Star of India (KCSI) ====
- Charles Alexander Innes, CSI, CIE, Indian Civil Service; Member of the Governor-General's Executive Council.
- General Sir Claud William Jacob, KCB, KCMG, ADC-Gen., Chief of the General Staff, India.

==== Companion of the Order of the Star of India (CSI) ====
- James Donald, CIE, Indian Civil Service, Member of the Executive Council of the Governor of Bengal.
- Lieutenant-Colonel William Frederick Travers O'Connor, CIE, CVO, British Envoy at the Court of Nepal.
- Ernest Sampson Lloyd, Indian Civil Service, Acting Chief Secretary to the Government of Madras.
- Leonard Frederick Morshead, Indian Civil Service, Member of the Board of Revenue, Bihar and Orissa.
- Henry Duffield Craik, Indian Civil Service, Chief Secretary to the Government of the Punjab.
- Samuel Andrew Smyth, Indian Civil Service, Commissioner, Mandalay Division, Burma.
- Lieutenant-Colonel Walter Hugh Jeffery, CIE, Indian Army, General Staff, Army Headquarters.
- Colin Gurdon Adam, Indian Civil Service, Private Secretary to His Excellency the Governor of Bombay.
- M R Ry Diwan Bahadur Thodla Raghavayya Pantulu Garu, Diwan of Travancore State, Madras.
- Maharaja Sir Ejaz Rasul Khan of Jahangirabad Raj, United Provinces.

=== Order of Saint Michael and Saint George ===
==== Knight Commander of the Order of St Michael and St George (KCMG) ====
- Alexander Ransford Slater, CMG, CBE, Governor and Commander-in-Chief of the Colony of Sierra Leone.
- The Honourable Littleton Ernest Groom, Attorney-General and Member of the House of Representatives of the Commonwealth of Australia.
- Wyndham Rowland Dunstan, LLD, FRS, CMG, for services as Director of the Imperial Institute.
- The Right Honourable the Earl Granville, GCVO, His Majesty's Envoy Extraordinary and Minister Plenipotentiary at Copenhagen.
- The Lord Kilmarnock, CMG, British High Commissioner on the Inter-Allied Rhineland High Commission.

==== Companion of the Order of St Michael and St George (CMG) ====
- Edward John Arnett, a Senior Resident in the Northern Provinces of Nigeria.
- William Benjamin Chaffey, Councillor of the Borough of Mildura, State of Victoria, in recognition of his services in connection with irrigation settlement in the State.
- Captain the Honourable Bede Edmund Hugh Clifford, MVO, in recognition of his services as Secretary to the Governor-General of the Union of South Africa.
- Eric Rücker Eddison, Principal in the Board of Trade, in recognition of his services as Secretary to the Imperial Economic Conference.
- The Honourable Richard Feetham, Judge of the Transvaal Provincial Division of the Supreme Court of the Union of South Africa, for services as Legal Adviser to the High Commissioner for South Africa.
- John Cyril Douglas Fenn, Chief Secretary to the Government of Cyprus.
- Edward Shaw Hose, British Resident, Negri Sembilan, Acting Chief Secretary to Government, Federated Malay States.
- William Warren Kerr, CBE, formerly President of the Associated Chambers of Commerce of Australia and Chairman of the Royal Commission on Taxation appointed by the Government of the Commonwealth of Australia, in recognition of his services to the Commonwealth of Australia.
- Thomas Luff Perkins, AMICE, ARIBA, lately Director of Public Works, Hong Kong.
- The Honourable John Scaddan, Minister for Mines, Railways, Industries and Woods and Forests, and Member of the House of Assembly, State of Western Australia.
- Henry Benjamin Shawe, ISO, Secretary for the Interior, Union of South Africa.
- The Honourable Percival Donald Leslie Fynn, Treasurer and Member of the Executive and Legislative Councils of Southern Rhodesia.
- Lieutenant-Colonel Hugh Marshall Hole, for service in the London Office of the British South Africa Company.
- James Robertson, Secretary, Department of the Administrator and Clerk to the Executive and Legislative Councils of Southern Rhodesia.
- Joseph Addison, Counsellor of His Majesty's Embassy at Berlin.

=== Order of the Indian Empire ===
==== Knight Grand Commander of the Order of the Indian Empire (GCIE) ====
- Maharajadhiraja Sir Bijay Chand Mahtab, Bahadur, KCSI, KCIE, IOM, of Burdwan, Vice-President of the Executive Council of the Governor of Bengal.

==== Knight Commander of the Order of the Indian Empire (KCIE) ====
- Arthur Rowland Knapp, CSI, CBE, Indian Civil Service, Member of the Executive Council of the Governor of Madras.
- Hugh Lansdown Stephenson, CSI, CIE, Indian Civil Service, Member of the Executive Council of the Governor of Bengal.
- Reginald Arthur Mant, CSI, Indian Civil Service, Member of the Executive Council of the Governor of the Punjab.
- Maung Khin, Member of the Executive Council of the Governor of Burma.
- Bhupendra Nath Mitra, CIE, CBE, Financial Adviser, Military Finance, Government of India.
- Nawab Muhammad Muzammilullah Khan, Khan Bahadur, OBE, of Bhikampur, United Provinces.

==== Companion of the Order of the Indian Empire (CIE) ====
- Lancelot Graham, Indian Civil Service, Officiating Secretary to the Government of India, Legislative Department.
- Crewe Armand Hamilton Townsend, Indian Civil Service, Officiating Chief Secretary to the Government of the Punjab.
- Edmund Willoughby Legh, Indian Civil Service, Acting Secretary to the Government of Madras, Revenue Department.
- Herbert Philip Duval, Indian Civil Service, Secretary to the Government of Bengal, Judicial Department, and Remembrancer of Legal Affairs, Bengal.
- James Campbell Ker, Indian Civil Service, Secretary to the Government of Bombay, General and Educational Departments.
- Frederick Fleetwood Bion, Chief Engineer, Public Works Department, Irrigation Branch, United Provinces.
- Walter Sidney Bremner, Chief Engineer and Secretary to Government, Bihar and Orissa.
- Percival Stanley Keelan, Chief Engineer, Mining, Bengal Coal Company.
- Colonel William Menzies Coldstream, Superintendent, Survey of India.
- Clement Wansbrough Gwynne, OBE, Indian Civil Service, Deputy Secretary to the Government of India, Home Department.
- Robert Benson Ewbank, Indian Civil Service, Deputy Secretary to the Government of India, Department of Education, Health and Lands.
- Behari Lai Dhingra, MD, Chief Minister, Jind State, Punjab.
- Shrimant Jagdeo Rao Puar, Bhau Sahib Maharaj, Chief Councillor, State Council, Dewas State (Senior Branch).
- Maulvi Nizam-ud-Din Ahmad, Nawab Nizamat Jang Bahadur, OBE, Minister in charge of the Political Department of His Exalted Highness the Nizam's Government, Hyderabad State.
- Sardar Sahibzada Sultan Ahmad Khan, Muntazim-ud-Daula, Member of the Gwalior State Council.
- Philip Graham Rogers, Indian Civil Service, Postmaster-General, Bombay.
- Charles William Dunn, Indian Civil Service, Registrar, Co-operative Societies, Burma.
- Raymond Evelyn Gibson, Indian Civil Service, Collector, Hyderabad and Sukkur, Sind.
- Major Guy Hamilton Russell, DSO, Commandant, South Waziristan Scouts, North-West Frontier Province.
- Bertrand James Glancy, Indian Civil Service, Member, Board of Control, Kashmir.
- M R Ry Diwan Bahadur Lewis Dominic Swamikannu Pillai Avargal, ISO, Secretary, Madras Legislative Council.
- Hugh Byard Clayton, Indian Civil Service, Municipal Commissioner for the City of Bombay.
- Ernest William Proctor Sims, Manager and Engineer-in-Chief, Junagadh State Railway.
- Khan Bahadur Muhammad Abdul Karim Khan, ISO, MBE, Landowner and Provincial Darbari, of Gul Imam, Dera Ismail Khan District, North-West Frontier Province.
- Maung Maung Bya, MBE, Assistant Registrar of Co-operative Societies, Burma.
- Sardar Bahadur Sheo Narayan Singh, Honorary Magistrate, Jullundur District, Punjab.
- George Deuchars, formerly Indian Public Works Department, lately Government Director of Indian Hallway Companies, India Office.

=== Royal Victorian Order ===
==== Knight Grand Cross of the Royal Victorian Order (GCVO) ====
- The Right Honourable Anthony, Earl of Shaftesbury, KP, KCVO, CBE.

==== Knight Commander of the Royal Victorian Order (KCVO) ====
- Archibald Douglas, Baron Blythswood, MVO.
- Sir James Humphreys Harrison, CVO.
- Surgeon Lieutenant-Colonel Sir Warren Crooke-Lawless, CB, CIE, CBE.
- Major-General George Darell Jeffreys, CB, CMG.

==== Commander of the Royal Victorian Order (CVO) ====
- Sir Homewood Crawford.
- Alexander Hendry, MVO, MD.
- Walter George Covington, MVO.
- William Alexander Lindsay, KG, Clarenceux King of Arms.

==== Member of the Royal Victorian Order, 4th class (MVO) ====
- Major Henry Angus Watson, CBE.
- Thomas Fell Molyneux, OBE.
- Frederic Stanley Osgood, OBE, MVO (5th Class).
- Haywood Temple Holmes, ISO, MVO (5th Class).
- George Slythe Street.

==== Member of the Royal Victorian Order, 5th class (MVO) ====
- Frederick James Bailey, (dated 15 October 1923).

=== Kaisar-i-Hind Medal ===
First Class, for Public Services in India

- Robert Niel Reid, Indian Civil Service, Collector, Rajshahi, Bengal.
- Sam Higginbottom, Principal, Agricultural Institute, Allahabad.
- Captain William Ewart Gladstone Solomon, Indian Educational Service, Principal, School of Art, Bombay.
- Edmund Tydeman, Indian Educational Service, Inspector of Training Institutions, Punjab.
- Commissioner Arthur Robert Blowers, Commissioner of the Salvation Army for South India and Ceylon, Madras.
- Dr. Augustus Sousa, Assistant Director of Public Health, III Range, Allahabad, United Provinces.
- Reverend John Roderic McKenzie, Head of the Scottish Episcopal Mission, Chanda, Central Provinces.
- Reverend Mother Marie Leonie, née Gabrielle Mallaret, Superioress, St Joseph's Convent, Moulmein, Burma.
- Khan Bahadur Abu Nasr Muhammad Yahia, Zamindar, Honorary Magistrate, Sylhet, Assam.
- Dr. Louisa Helena Hart, Medical Missionary, Madanapalle, Madras.

=== Order of the British Empire ===
==== Medal of the Order of the British Empire ====
Civil Division

- Sergeant William Brereton, late The Connaught Rangers, for Meritorious Service.

=== King's Police Medal (KPM) ===
England & Wales

Police

- Lieutenant-Colonel Herbert Sutherland Walker, CBE, Chief Constable, Worcestershire Constabulary.
- Major William Hugh Dunlop, Chief Constable, East Riding of Yorkshire Constabulary.
- Captain Dennis Granville, MVO, OBE, Chief Constable, Dorsetshire Constabulary.
- John Henderson Watson, OBE, Chief Constable, Bristol City Police Force.
- Frederick Walter Mullineux, Chief Constable, Bolton Borough Police Force.
- John Berry, Chief Constable, Barrow-in-Furness Borough Police Force.
- Harry Haigh, Assistant-Chief Constable, West Riding of Yorkshire Constabulary.
- John Waller, MBE, Assistant Chief Constable, Durham Constabulary.
- Charles Goddard, Superintendent, Berkshire Constabulary.
- William Davis, Superintendent, Hampshire Constabulary.
- William Whitty, MBE, Superintendent, Grimsby Borough Police Force.
- Fred Taylor, MBE, Chief Superintendent, Manchester City Police Force.
- Alfred Beesley, Sergeant (CID), Metropolitan Police (now Chief Constable of the Folkestone Borough Police Force).
- Walter Hobbs, Sergeant (CID), Metropolitan Police.
- Alfred Flint, Constable, Metropolitan Police.
- John Butherford, Constable (CID), Metropolitan Police.
- John Dubber, Constable, Metropolitan Police.
- John Cozens, Constable, Metropolitan Police.
- Arthur Cyril Goodison, Constable, Leeds City Police Force.
- Sam Roe, Constable, Glossop Borough Police Force.
- Charles Sadgrove, Constable, Metropolitan Police.
- Joseph Allen, Constable, Metropolitan Police.
- John Cooper, Constable, Metropolitan Police.
- Henry Lovegrove, Constable, Metropolitan Police.

Fire Brigades

- Major Cyril Clarke Boville Morris MC, MIME, Senior Divisional Officer, London Fire Brigade.
- Arthur R. Corlett, OBE, Superintendent of the Manchester (Police) Fire Brigade.
- John W. Dane, Chief Officer, Croydon Fire Brigade.
- Henry Stancliff Leedom, Fireman, London Fire Brigade.

Scotland

- John Morren, Chief Constable of the Counties of Roxburgh, Berwick and Selkirk.
- James Sparks, Constable, Glasgow City Police Force.
- George Ferguson, Constable, Glasgow City Police Force.

Ireland

- Edward Joseph Conran, District Inspector, Royal Ulster Constabulary.
- James Armstrong, District Inspector, Royal Ulster Constabulary.
- Samuel Wallace Kennedy, District Commandant, Class "B" Special Constabulary, Londonderry City.
- John Johnston, Head Constable, Royal Ulster Constabulary.
- Anthony Henry, Head Constable, Royal Ulster Constabulary.
- James Smylie, Head Constable, Royal Ulster Constabulary.

India

- Alexander John Happell, Superintendent, Madras Police.
- William, Rees John, Assistant Superintendent, Madras Police.
- Hugh Keene, Assistant Superintendent, Madras Police.
- Claude Robert Charsley, Assistant Superintendent, Madras Police.
- Edward Hilder Colebrook, Assistant Superintendent, Madras Police.
- Frank William Goodsell, Sergeant, Madras Police.
- Muchakkal Gopalan Nayar, Constable, Malabar Special Police, Madras Police.
- Ariakkal Vettath Bappu, Head Constable, Madras Police.
- Frederick William O'Gorman, Acting Superintendent, Bombay Police.
- Chinnappa Gurupadappa Shivashetti, Sub-Inspector, Bombay Police.
- Pawadappa Annappa, Head Constable, Bombay Police.
- Bhau Ramchandra Nikam, Head Constable, Bombay Police.
- Chaturbhai Kishabhai Amin, Sub-Inspector, Bombay Police.
- Rasulmian Miyanbhai, Head Constable Kathiawar Agency Police, Bombay Police.
- Chimandas Dewandas Motwani, Deputy Superintendent, Bombay Police.
- Raghabendra Nath Banarji, Deputy Superintendent, Bengal Police.
- Keshab Lai Bahhacharji, Inspector, Bengal Police.
- Eric Hodson, Officiating Additional Superintendent, Bengal Police.
- William Cook, Assistant Commissioner, Calcutta City Police, Bengal Police.
- Surendra Nath Banarji, Officiating Deputy Superintendent, Bengal Police.
- Niaz Ahmad Khan, Sub-Inspector, United Provinces Police.
- Saiyed Sajjad Hussain, Sub-Inspector, United Provinces Police.
- Victor William Smith, OBE, Superintendent, Punjab Police.
- William George Clarke, MBE, Additional Superintendent, Punjab Police.
- Thomas Raleigh Bassett, Assistant Superintendent, Punjab Police.
- Kirori Singh, Foot Constable, Punjab Police.
- Maung Thaing, Deputy Superintendent (retired), Burma Police.
- Hare Krishna Das, Inspector, Bihar and Orissa Police.
- Ram Beas Pandey, Constable, Bihar and Orissa Police.
- William Henry Montagu Wilson, Superintendent, Bihar and Orissa Police.
- Walter Cyril Plumb, Officiating District Officer, North-West Frontier Police.
- Francis Herbert DuHeaume, Assistant District Officer, North-West Frontier Police.
- Zabardast Khan, Sub-Inspector, North-West Frontier Police.
- Akhmad Khan, Foot Constable, North-West Frontier Police.
- Maizulla Khan, Foot Constable, North-West Frontier Police.
- Mehr Dil, Foot Constable, North-West Frontier Police.
- Zaman Jan, Foot Constable, North-West Frontier Police.
- Gulan Khan, Foot Constable, North-West Frontier Police.
- Sultan Ahmad, Foot Constable, North-West Frontier Police.
- Gheba Khan, Head Constable, Zhob-Loralai Police, Baluchistan Police.

His Majesty has also graciously consented to the King's Police Medal being handed to the nearest relatives of the undermentioned Officers, who were killed on duty on 18 August 1922, and who would have received the decoration had they survived:.

- Chandansing Briavansing, Sowar, Palanpur Agency Police, Bombay Police.
- Issarsing Sawatsing, Sowar, Palanpur Agency Police, Bombay Police.

Bar to the King's Police Medal

British Oversea Dominions, Colonies, Protectorates and Mandated Territories

- John Cochrane, Chief of Police, Gibraltar.
- Captain George Echlin Smith, Commandant of Police and Governor of Prisons, Zanzibar.
- Richard Shearman Godley, OBE, Deputy Commissioner, South African Police, Union of South Africa.
- William Ernest Earle, Inspector, South African Police, Union of South Africa.
- Claude Myles, Inspector, South African Police, Union of South Africa.
- Alfred Ernest Trigger, MBE, Inspector, South African Police, Union of South Africa.
- William Christopher Loftus, Inspector, South African Police, Union of South Africa.
- Layton Herbert Burgess, Head Constable, South African Police, Union of South Africa.
- Nathu son of Boota, Railway Police, Constable, Federated Malay States.
- Garba Kano, Police Constable, Nigeria.
- Captain Joseph Cyril Brundell, British South Africa Police, Superintendent, Criminal Investigation Department and Chief Immigration Officer.
- Kamel Irani, Inspector, Palestine Police Force.

His Majesty has also graciously consented to the King's Police Medal being handed to the nearest relatives of the undermentioned Officers, who were killed on duty and who would have received the decoration had they survived;

- Charles Gilbertson White, Volunteer Fireman, East Fremantle Fire Brigade, Western Australia.
- Frederick George Henderson, Trooper, Tasmanian Police Force.

=== Companion of the Imperial Service Order (ISO) ===
- John Cannell, Chief Clerk, Rolls Office, Isle of Man.

=== Air Force Cross (AFC) ===
- Flying Officer Basil Royston Carter.

=== Promotions ===
Dated 31 December 1923.

Royal Navy

Commander to Captain

- M. Brock Birkett, DSO.
- John S. G. Fraser, DSO.
- John C. Tovey, DSO.
- Edward McC. W. Lawrie, DSO.
- James S. M. Ritchie.
- Robert R. Turner, DSO.
- George F. B. Edward-Collins.
- Brian Egerton.
- Francis T. B. Tower, OBE.

Lieutenant-Commander to Commander

- William V. Rice, DSO.
- William S. F. Macleod, OBE.
- A. Gordon Hine, DSO.
- Robert Mends.
- Edward W. Kitson.
- Cecil S. Sandford, OBE.
- Cecil R. E. W. Perryman, DSC.
- Kenneth H. L. Mackenzie.
- Robert L. Burnett.
- Cuthbert H. Heath-Caldwell, DSC.
- Gerald P. Bowen, OBE.
- Guy O. Lydekker, DSC.
- Henry F. Minchin.
- Eldred S. Brooksmith, DSC.
- George A. Scott, DSC.
- Edward R. B. Kemble.
- W. Tofield Makeig-Jones.
- Douglas A. Budgen.
- Frederic C. Bradley.

Engineer-Commander to Engineer-Captain

- Frank A. Butler.
- Frank R. Goodwin, DSO.
- Alfred W. McKinlay, OBE.

Engineer Lieutenant-Commander to Engineer Commander

- Geoffrey Hick.
- Ernest McK. Phillips.
- Alexander H. Parry.
- Percival W. Allen.
- Harold T. Evans.
- Augustus Shackle.
- Cyril T. Clover.
- Herbert A. Slade.
- David N. H. Bowen.
- Frederick R. G. Turner, OBE.
- Frank V. King.

Surgeon Commander to Surgeon Captain

- Arthur R. H. Skey, MB.
- Robert H. Mornement, OBE.
- James H. Fergusson.
- Henry C. Whiteside.
- John R. Muir, MB.

Paymaster Commander to Paymaster Captain

- Harry M. C. Elliott.
- William E. Crocker.
- Frederick A. F. Banbury.
- Edgar B. Swan.
- Charles E. Batt, CMG.
- Henshaw R. Russell, CMG.
- Herbert S. Measham, CMG.

Royal Marines

- Lieutenant Richard W. Spraggett, MC, to Captain.

Royal Naval Reserve

Commander to Captain

- Alfred V. R. Lovegrove, DSO, RD.

Lieutenant-Commander to Commander

- John Walker, RD.
- Arthur R. D. Collins, OBE, RD.
- John E. Haswell, RD.
- Richard H. Buck, RD.

Paymaster Lieutenant-Commander (Registrar Class) to Paymaster Commander

- Edwin A. Taffs, RD.
- Herbert M. Hambling, RD.

Royal Air Force
General Duties Branch

Air Commodore to Air Vice-Marshal

- Francis Rowland Scarlett, CB, DSO.
- Henry Robert Moore Brooke-Popham, CB, CMG, DSO, AFC.

Wing Commander to Group Captain

- William Foster MacNeece, CBE, DSO, DFC.
- Cecil Francis Kilner, DSO.

Squadron Leader to Wing Commander

- Alexander Charles Winter, OBE.
- Arthur Bruce Gaskell, DSC.
- Arnold John Miley, OBE.
- Archibald Corbett-Wilson.
- Arthur William Tedder.
- Ernest Henry Johnston, OBE.
- Bertine Entwisle Sutton, DSO, OBE, MC.
- Wilham Ronald Bead, MC, DFC, AFC.

Flight Lieutenant to Squadron Leader

- Alfred William Clifford Vernon Parr.
- Oswyn George William Gifford Lywood, OBE.
- Thomas Geoffrey Bowler.
- William Hickley Lovell O'Neill, MC.
- Francis Edgcombe Hellyer, OBE.
- Edward Ardley Beaulah.
- Eric Roby Vaisey.
- Cyril Bertram Cooke.
- Robert Dickinson Oxland.
- Richard Cecil Hardstaff.
- Douglas Iron, OBE.
- Arthur Trafalgar Williams.
- Edward Dawson Atkinson, DFC, AFC.
- Claude Russell Cox, AFC.
- James Milne Robb, DFC.
- Harold Melsome Probyn, DSO.
- Reginald Frederick Stuart Leslie, DSC, DFC, AFC.
- John Leacroft, MC.
- Vincent Greenwood.
- William Hastings de Warrenne Waller, AFC.
- Leonard Horatio Slatter, OBE, DSC, DFC.
- Lionel Mundy Bailey, AFC.
- Thomas Edward Barham Howe, AFC.
- Siegfried Richards Watkins, AFC.
- Victor Somerset Erskine Lindop.
- Walter Hunt Longton, DFC, AFC.
- Horace Percy Lale, DSO, DFC.

Flying Officer to Flight Lieutenant

- Edward Selwyn Moulton-Barrett.
- Robert Alexander Birkbeck, DFC.
- Desmond Fitzgerald Fitz-Gibbon, DSC.
- Aubrey Beauclerk Ellwood, DSC.
- Cyril Chapman, DSC.
- John Auguste Boret, MC, AFC.
- Thomas Arthur Warne-Browne, DSC.
- Albert Edward Dark.
- Clifford Westly Busk, MC.
- Eric Burton.
- Norbert Marie Sackville Russell.
- Arthur Gordon Jarvis, AFC.
- John Eric MacLennan.
- Robert Mordaunt Foster, DFC.
- Charles Crawford.
- Percy Harold Davy.
- William Harold Markham.
- Harold Thomas Lydford, AFC.
- Maurice Burbidge.
- Clarence Edward Williamson-Jones, DFC.
- Harold Hunter Down, AFC.
- Lynden Charles Wynne-Tyson.
- Francis Charles Beresford Savile.
- Frank Wright.
- George Gaywood Banting.
- Arthur Mostyn Wray, MC, AFC.
- John Bussey.
- Walter English Swann.
- George Vivian Howard, DFC.
- Seymour Caley Harker.
- George Dermot Daly, DFC.
- Charles Frederick Le Poer Trench.
- Clifford Arthur Bernard Bowman Wiilcock, AFC.
- William Munro Yool.
- Herbert Nind Hampton, DFC.
- Frank Linden Hopps, AFC.
- Louis William Jarvis.
- Henry Michael Moody, MC.
- Charles James Wilfred Hatcher, AFC.
- Dudley Price.
- Stanley Harry Wallace, MC.
- John Henry Bentham.
- Richard Llewellyn Crofton, MBE.
- Vivian Steel Parker.
- William Stanley Watson.
- Walter John Seward.
- Bruce Bernard Caswell.
- Edward Leslie Barrington, MC, DFC.
- Stuart Douglas Culley, DSO.
- James MacGregor Fairweather, DFC.
- William James Daddo-Langlois.
- Harold Victor Bobbins.
- Stephen Charles Strafford, DFC.
- Erie Hardy Richardson.
- John Robert Irving Scambler, AFC.
- Robert John Rodwell.
- Andrew MacGregor, DFC.
- George Howard Homer Scutt, MC.
- John Wakeling Baker, MC.
- Hugh Robert Junor, DFC.
- Francis Joseph Fogarty.
- Humphrey William Baggs.
- Leslie Gordon Harvey.
- Allan Lancelot Addison Perry-Keene.
- Edward Percy Mackay.
- William Henry Pools, AFC, MM.
- Christopher Holt Stilwell.
- John McFarlane, MC.
- Noel Hamilton Jay.
- Reginald James Read.
- Frederick Thomasson, DFC, MM.
- Theodore Linley Lowe.
- Herbert Hackney.
- James Clement Foden, AFC.
- Hubert Poyntz-Gaynor Leigh.
- Douglas Leslie Blackford.

Stores Branch

Flight Lieutenant to Squadron Leader

- George Stevens, OBE.
- Francis George Maxwell Williams.
- John Samuel Goggin.
- Percy Mead Brambleby.
- Frederick Grave, MBE.

Flying Officer to Flight Lieutenant

- George Arthur Curtis.
- Alfred George Knight, MBE.
- Eric Leighton Ridley.
- John Hobbs.
- Lewis Edward Carter, DCM.
- Charles Edward Cullen.
- Frederick Whilton, DCM.
- Leonard Henry Vernon.

Stores Branch Accountants

Squadron Leader to Wing Commander

- William Hughes Holroyd.
- Herbert John Down.

Flying Officer to Flight Lieutenant

- Edwin James Grout.
- Robert Milne Grundy.
- Herbert Wellstead Capener.
- Robert Frederick Charles Metcalfe.
- Sidney Glanvill Linssen.
- Edward Charles Mackintosh Knott.
