= Gangwar (surname) =

Indian surname

Gangwar is an Indian surname which is often associated with Kurmi caste of northern India.

== Notable people ==
This is a list of notable people carrying "Gangwar" as their surname, who may or may not be associated with the Kurmi caste:

- Bhagwat Saran Gangwar, former member of Uttar Pradesh Legislative Assembly (UPLA) from Nawabganj Assembly constituency.
- Chhatrapal Singh Gangwar, former member of UPLA.
- Chetram Gangwar, former Member of UPLA from Nawabganj Assembly constituency.
- Harish Kumar Gangawar, former Member of Indian Parliament from Pilibhit Lok Sabha constituency.
- Kesar Singh Gangwar, former member of UPLA.
- Santosh Gangwar, former Minister of State in Ministry of Labour and Employment, Government of India.
- Sanjay Singh Gangwar, member of UPLA from Pilibhit Assembly constituency.

== See also ==
- Maurya (surname)
- Shakya (surname)
