= M. P. Arya =

Indian politician

M. P. Arya Gangwar

Member of the Uttar Pradesh Legislative Assembly
- Incumbent
- Assumed office March 2022
- Constituency: Nawabganj Assembly constituency

Personal details
- Party: Bharatiya Janata Party
- Education: Ganesh Shankar Vidyarthi Memorial Medical College
- Occupation: Politician

M. P. Arya Gangwar (born 1958) is an Indian politician from Uttar Pradesh. He is a member of the Uttar Pradesh Legislative Assembly from Nawabganj Assembly constituency in Bareilly district. He won the 2022 Uttar Pradesh Legislative Assembly election representing the Bharatiya Janata Party.

== Early life and education ==
Arya is from Nawabganj, Bareilly district, Uttar Pradesh. He is the son of Dori Lal. He completed his MBBS in 1985 at Ganesh Shankar Vidyarthi Memorial Medical College, Kanpur.

== Career ==
Arya won from Nawabganj Assembly constituency representing Bharatiya Janata Party in the 2022 Uttar Pradesh Legislative Assembly election. He polled 111,113 votes and defeated his nearest rival, Bhagwat Saran Gangwar of the Samajwadi Party, by a margin of 9,237 votes.
