= Turf War =

Turf War or Turf Wars may refer to:

== Music ==
- Turf Wars, a 2007 album by the Canadian band Daggermouth
- "Turf War", a song on the 2001 album Filmtracks 2000 by American composer Bill

== Television ==
- Turf War (TV series), a 2010 American reality television series
- "Turf War" (The Office), a 2012 episode of the American comedy television series The Office
- "Turf War", an episode of the 2012 American television series The Mob Doctor
- "Turf War", an episode of the 2012 American television series NYC 22
- "Turf War", a 2010 episode of the American television series Swords
- "My Turf War", a 2007 episode of the American television series Scrubs

== Other ==
- Turf war (conflict), a conflict or dispute over territory
- "Turf War" (Banksy), a 2003 exhibition by street artist Banksy
- The Legend of Korra: Turf Wars, a three-part graphic novel series
- Turf War (horse), tied winner of the 2007 Delta Jackpot Stakes
- Turf War, a mode of play in the 2000 video game Smuggler's Run
- Turf War, a gameplay mode in Nintendo's video game series Splatoon
- Turf Wars, a gameplay mode in GTA:San Andreas

== See also ==
- Territorial dispute, a disagreement over control of territories (land, water, or airspace)
- Gang war (disambiguation)
- Turf (disambiguation)
