= Zahida Khatun Sherwani =

Indian Urdu-language poet

- Born: Zahida Begum; 18 December 1894; Bhikampur, Bhikampur and Datawali (Aligarh) State, British Raj, now India
- Died: 2 February 1922 (aged 27); Bhikampur, Bhikampur and Datawali (Aligarh) State, now India
- Resting place: Aligarh, Uttar Pradesh, India
- Other names: Zay Khay Sheen (1912–1922); Nuzhat; Gul (1905–1911)
- Years active: 1905– January 1922
- Known for: Poetry and promotion of women's rights
- Parents: Nawab Muzammil-Ullah Khan (father); Hejazi Begum (d. 17 November 1897) (mother)
- Relatives: Haji Ahmad Saeed Khan (Uncle); Ahmadi Begum (sister); Ahmed-Ullah Khan Hairan Sherwani (brother) (d. 19 April 1916) Anas Khan Abad (cousin) (d. November 1918); Hajia Qudsia Begum (maternal-Aunt) (d. 9 November 1921)

Ze Khe Sheen (born Zahida Khatun Sherwani; 18 December 1894 – 2 February 1922; sometimes spelled Zay Khay Sheen) was an Indian poet and writer who wrote in the Urdu language and was also an activist for women's rights. She published her poetry under the pseudonyms Zay Khay Sheen (or Z-Kh-S) and Nuzhat, as her conservative Muslim society did not permit women to write poetry or initiate movements upholding the rights of women. She belonged to a rich family of landholders of the Sherwani tribe. Her poems and ghazals in Urdu, which had a "female touch", had romantic appeal for young people.

== Biography ==
Zahida Khatun Sherwani was born on 18 December 1894 at Bhikampur in the Aligarh district of North India. Her father was Nawab Sir Muhammad Muzammilullah Khan (1865–1938), a rais (rich man) of Bhikampur who had taken an active part in the Aligarh Movement. The Sherwani clan to which he belonged were scholarly people of high standing in the educational field, who although progressive were conservative in outlook. As Sherwani's mother died young her father took a keen interest in the education of his children – Sherwani, her older sister Ahmadi and her younger brother Ahmadullah. He performed for them the formal Bismillah ceremony which marked an initiation to the teachings of Quran. Sherwani was then four years old. She and her sister were taught Persian as part of an education in rich culture, under a governess, Farkhunda Begam Teherani, an Iranian woman who had migrated to India and who was proficient in reading, writing and teaching poetry to her students. Sherwani learned to write poetry not only in Persian but also in Urdu under her tutelage and also obtained knowledge of life in the world beyond the limits of their home in Aligarh. When Sherwani was 10 years old, she declared her intentions to become a poet in her first poem, which reads:

Aisi banun main sha'irah jaisi koi na ho
Sara jahan nazm meri dekhta rahe.

Translation:

May I become like no other poetess
That the whole world may know my verse.

Sherwani's father ensured that she and her siblings learned Islamic theology and expository prose in Urdu. For this purpose, he appointed Muhammad Ya'qub Isra'ilithe, who belonged to the family of the Imam of the Juma Mosque of Aligarh and who had participated in the Ahl-I-Hadith movement. During this period her father was also active in Aligarh in establishing a girls' school and women's normal school and upgrading the Aligarh College into a Muslim University. At this time Sherwani wrote poetry and also other articles and published them in magazines such as Khatun of Aligarh, Ismat of Delhi and Sharif Bibi of Lahore. She was also responsible for establishing the Young Sherwanis' League comprising young members of the Sherwani clan, which promoted schools for the children of Bhikampur and Datauli and generated funds to run a boarding house for the Aligarh Girls' School.

She wrote about the conditions of Muslims in other places and also scripted nazms (Urdu poetry in rhymed verse) on the Tripolitan wars, the Balkan War (1911–13) and the Kanpur Mosque Tragedy (1913), and when a Red Crescent was also set up in Aligarh.

A nazm Sherwani wrote in 1913 titled ‘Id ki Khushi men Ghamzadegan-i-Kanpur (Festival of ‘Id in Memory of the Victims of Kanpur) was published under her pen name Nuzhat in Zamindar, a newspaper of Lahore. Her father, who saw this article, was unhappy with the tenor of the article which criticized the government and covered Muslim political causes, warned his daughter to be careful in her writings, though he was appreciative of her poetry. Another poem she published in Zamindar, titled Mosul ka tail, which dealt with the importance of oil in the international economy and the West's move to control oil deposits around the world, also alarmed her father.

Upset with her father's warnings, she discontinued writing for some time. She resumed writing poetry without telling her father. In the meanwhile, her brother Ahmadullah died in 1916 which anguished her as he was a constant support and source of information to her. After this tragedy her tenor of writing took a serious turn and in 1918 she published Sipas Nama-i-Urdu (In Praise of Urdu) which was narrated on the occasion of the inauguration of Osmania University, Hyderabad, then the only institution of higher education in India where Urdu was the medium of instruction; she had published the poem under her pseudonym and people did not know then that it was written by a woman. Shan-ul-Haq Haqqee wrote a critique on this poem noting "its powerful imagery and the parallels the poet draws between the status of Urdu—marginalized, ignored, hidden from view—and the status of women in her society". She had also evinced interest in the Gandhian swadeshi movement and had started changing her wardrobe with clothes made of khadi in support of Indian nationalism.

Sherwani did not get married, as a cousin whom she was to marry died young. There was no other prospective groom who suited her rich family background. She died on Thursday 2 February 1922 at 27. An obituary issued in the women's magazine Tahzib un-Niswan said: "She was a nightingale, now silenced, who was born in a cage, lived her whole life in that cage, and there drew her last breath."

== Appreciation ==
Zahida Khatoon Sherwani is the subject matter of a doctoral thesis under the title Zay Khay Sheen written by Fatima Hasan. In a lecture given to the Working Women Welfare Trust at Karachi, Hasan spoke glowingly about Sheen saying "...Sheen took part in various feminist activities aimed at promoting and encouraging women's right to education and empowerment. Even the tragedies of the death of her grandparents, mother, brother and fiancé that she suffered in her very young age could not deter her from continuing with the mission." Hasan also said about her: "She was a visionary and she wrote on a variety of topics such as farming and farmers, World War, Aligarh University and the Khilafat Movement. Her poetic work Masnavi Aina-i-Haram on women's rights was like Allama Iqbal's Shikwa and drew the latter's remarks that had Zay Khay Sheen lived longer, she would have achieved as much as he did".

Zay Khay Sheen is also the theme of two MA and MPhil graduate theses.
