= Kaimganj railway station =

Railway station in Uttar Pradesh, India

General information
- Location: Kaimganj, Farukhabad, Uttar Pradesh; India
- Coordinates: 27.540855°N 79.327064°E
- System: Indian Railway Station
- Owner: Indian Railways
- Operator: North Eastern Railway
- Platforms: 2
- Tracks: 3

Construction
- Structure type: Standard

Other information
- Station code: KMJ
- Fare zone: NER
Location
- Location within India Location within Uttar Pradesh

Kaimganj railway station is located in Kaimganj Nagar Palika Parishad of Farrukhabad district, in Indian state of Uttar Pradesh. This station with two platforms serves Kaimganj town. Its code is KMJ. Passenger and Express trains halt here.

A broad gauge line connects Kaimganj to Kanpur via Farrukhabad and to Mathura via Kasganj.
