= Siyaram Gangwar =

Indian politician

Siyaram Gangwar was a Member of Legislative Assembly from Kaimganj, Uttar Pradesh, India. He had an active role in various operations against the British Government in the 1930s and 1940s. He was elected as member of the Uttar Pradesh Legislative Assembly in 1951, 1962 and 1969. He also served as Deputy Minister of Finance in the cabinet of Kamalapati Tripathi from May 1971 to June 1973.

== Career ==
Gangwar was a freedom fighter in the Panchala region, for whom the local British administration offered an award of Rs.500 for capturing him dead or alive. He spent 14 years in hiding between 1933 and 1947. During this period, he served people of Gola and Meerut while treating them with the Homeopathic and Ayurvedic medicines.

After independence, Gangwar contributed towards the development of Kaimganj. He was the only politician to be elected to represent Kaimganj assembly seat on three occasions, in 1951, 1962 and 1969. He served as Deputy Minister of Finance in the cabinet of Kamalapati Tripathi from 21 May 1971 until 12 June 1973.

He also contested the Lok Sabha Election in 1980 and managed to get 20.89% votes while contesting as a candidate of Congress (I).
