= Gang war (disambiguation) =

A gang war is a type of conflict among street gangs.

Gang war may also refer to:

== Film ==
- Gang War (1928 film), an American film about gangsters
- Gang War (1940 film), an American film featuring an African American cast
- Gang War, an alternative name for Paper Bullets, a 1941 American film
- Gang War (1958 film) a 1958 American film starring Charles Bronson
- Gang War a 1962 British film featuring David Davies
- Gang War (1971 film), a 1971 Italian comedy film
- Gang War: Bangin' In Little Rock, a 1994 documentary film

== Video games ==
- Gang Wars (video game), a 1989 video game
- Crime Life: Gang Wars, a 2005 video game

== See also ==
- Gangwar (disambiguation)
- Turf war (disambiguation)
- War Against the Gangs
- Category:Organized crime conflicts
