= Kuldeep Singh Gangwar =

Indian politician

Kuldeep Singh Gangwar is a former Member of the Uttar Pradesh Legislative Assembly from Kaimganj (2007–2012).
