= Rahil Begum Sherwani =

Indian politician and founder of the All India Women's Muslim League (1894-1982)

- Born: Bibi Rahila Khatun; 1894; Aligarh, British India
- Died: 1982 (aged 87–88)
- Other name: Rahil Begum Shervaniya
- Political party: All India Muslim League
- Relatives: Haroon Khan Sherwani (brother)

Bibi Rahila Khatun also known as Rahil Begum Sherwani (1894 - 1982) was an Indian politician. She was the founder of the All India Women's Muslim League (AIWML), the women's wing of the All India Muslim League. It was inaugurated by Muhammad Ali Jinnah in Aligarh in 1938.

She was the younger sister of the Indian scholar Haroon Khan Sherwani and the daughter of Haji Musa Khan Sherwani.

== Movement Raheel Begum Sharwania ==
During the present regime the people treated this as the story that on 6 June 1954 Sir Syed Ahmed Khan suggested in dream to Raheel Begum Sharwani for establishment of Women Education institution. So within 15 days she (late) obtained a rental house on 27 June for one hundred rupees, she founded the within four days i.e. along with other four women on the basis of day and night struggle.

Raheel Begum Sharwania was born on 29 May famous family of Sharwani in Uttar Pradesh, her late father Nawab Moosa Khan was one of the leading personality of Aligarh, he was also greatest leader of Freedom Movement and leading politician.

Nawab Faiz Ahmed Khan of Datawali, grandfather of Raheel Begum migrated to Hijaz when the Englishmen taken over the control in . Nawab Moosa Khan (Late) father of Raheel Begum was born in Holy Makkah, Nawab Faiz Ahmed Khan purchase lot of properties in Holy Makkah and Taif and also constructed houses, mosques, gardens etc. he was the leading man in Hijaz and called as “Khawaja Hindi” in all the Arab, he also constructed out of residential houses, one house just opposite Haram Sharif Mountain which is called as Jabl-e-Hindi. In 1877 when the Russian attack on the Turkey Nawab Faiz Ahmed Khan grandfather of Raheel Begum paid Rs.50,000/- to Khalifa Al-Muslimeen Sultan Abdul Hameed Khan as Financial Assistance and thereafter the Salami of eight guns made for late Nawab Sahib.

Nawab Moosa Khan late father of Raheel Begum Sharwania was born in Makkah and after the death of his father he return to India. He was a great writer on the basis of his ability and merit Sir Syed Ahmed Khan deputed him at the age of 19 years as the Trustee of M.A.O. College.

During the early age he took interest in the country politics when day by day his participation in politics in increased. In the year 1903 he separated from Indian National Congress and invited all the leading personality of Indian Muslim at Aligarh, hence through this process separate political party started movement for the Muslims of India, on the basis of this movement in 1906 under the leadership of His Highness Sir Aga Khan Third with Lord Minto Viceroy of India and accepted the suggestion of separation.

The movement of Nawab Moosa Khan father of Raheel Begum established All India Muslim League in Dhaka during 1906 and Head Office of the party was in the residence of Nawab Sahib at Aligarh from 1906 to 1910. After establishment of Dhaka in 1908 held first meeting of All India Muslim League at Amritsar under the leadership of Late Nawab Sahib, as well as a combined meeting of Muslim League and Congress in 1917 held at Lakhnow and he was the secretary, on the basis of efforts of Quaid-e-Azam Muhammad Ali Jinnah and Nawab Sahib and agreement was final in the said meeting which was called as “Lakhnow Packet”, Late Nawab Moosa Khan father of Raheel Begum was the Secretary of Central Khilafat Committee and also President of UP Khilafat Committee, in the Bungalow of Nawab Sahib (Musharraf Manzil) wherein the Head Office of All India Muslim League was situated up to 4 years and on the top of the Central Politics of India year by year but also the said bungalow was used as the residence of leading personality of Hindu Muslim and other person, therefore birth of Raheel Begum Sharwania, her education, struggle for the freedom was made in the said period and also avoid all type of publicity and therefore the leadership of Government was given to her on the basis of full and successful life, she was selected as the member of Muslim League in the age of 12 years and in early ages she participated in the struggle of freedom.

In April 1920 the marriage of Raheel Begum was held with the leading politician, management of Nawab Mir Mehboob Ali Khan Nizam-e-Dakan and the son Mirza Yahya Baig of Nawab Sarwar Jang Late but three years due to death of her husband she became widow and in spite of suggestion she did not arrange second marriage and he fully participated in the struggle of freedom and whole the life she worked for the Millat-e-Islamia and specially for the education of Muslim women. After return from London in 1936 when Quaid-e-Azam Muhammad Ali Jinnah started new membership of Muslim League and called the first meeting of 9 leading Muslim Politicians including Nawab Moosa Khan, father of Raheel Begum, the said meeting was held in new constructed house of Quaid-e-Azam situated at Mount Pleasant Road Bombay, when Raheel Begum along with her late father arrived there, after introduction from Quaid-e-Azam she was allowed participate in the meeting because there was no representation from Muslim women in the said meeting, hence it is completed on the participation of daughter of Nawab Sahib.

Raheel Begum Sharwania was the permanent member of All India Muslim League Council but Quaid-e-Azam also selected as the member of All India Muslim Women Sub-Committee and she was remain the member till the exist of Pakistan. In 1938 Raheel Begum along with Begum Nawab Ismail Khan and MLA Begum Habibullah and other Muslim League Women from Lakhnow visited different cities of India and after day and night struggle she established All India Women Muslim League, its opening was held by Quaid-e-Azam at Aligarh on 23 January 1938.

Struggle for the Indian Muslim Freedom Raheel Begum also given special attention to the education of Muslim women, at that time M.A.O College of Sir Syed Ahmed Khan was very much popular wherein Nawab Moosa father of Raheel Begum also included in the trustees, when the Muslim women required for such organization, therefore Nawab Sahib given a large area of land for this purpose, when late Sheikh Abdullah taken this work he included Raheel Begum for the establishment of women school.

This school was so developed and thereafter it was granted the capacity of Residence College for Muslim Girls in India and was popular as Aligarh Muslim University Girls College, on the basis of full attention of Raheel Begum towards the women education, she was selected as the member of management committee of All India Muslim Educational Conference which was established by Sir Syed Ahmed Khan, she made great struggle for the establishment of residence college but also established various welfare organization for Muslim women in Aligarh wherein adult education and crafts. After existing of Pakistan Raheel Begum Sharwania shifted in Karachi along with her two sons Mirza Humayun Baig and Mirza Jawad Baig and fully involved in the development of Pakistan and Social Welfare work in the interest of women, in the beginning the residence of migrated peoples was the problem but on the basis of her full attention and struggle she given the priority to the migrated women residence and jobs. In 1948 Prime Minister of Pakistan Late Nawab Zada Liaquat Ali Khan established a rehabilitation and allotment committee and selected only women member to her.

Along with a rehabilitation of migrated women Raheel Begum also given attention to the women education, therefore after arrival in Karachi she contacted with her old friend and leading political member Late Noor-us-Saba Begum and established “Bazm-e-Amal Khawateen” on 18 November Karachi, and also established “Bazm-e-Amal Khawateen School” in the area of Gru Mandir New Town Karachi, thereafter which was known as “New Town Secondary School”.

In 1951 during the regime of Prime Minister Khawaja Nazimuddin when the foundation of Muslim Women League of Pakistan, Raheel Begum Sharwania was selected the First President but after removal of Late Khawaja Nazimuddin Government due to Governor General Ghulam Muhammad she very much upset and withdrew herself from the politics forever.

In spite of public pressure and demand she never returned and she gave her remaining life for the development of women education and women welfare.

Thereafter Raheel Begum perform efficient performance which is increase and other process in respect of women education of Pakistan in the history, in our country the people are involved for their popularity and greeting hence the performance of Raheel Begum may be remember all the time, this statement taken from the newspaper, she stated that:

On 6 June 1954 he saw in the dream that she was playing in early ages with Sir Syed Ahmed Khan and he raised his hand on the head of Raheel Begum as a daughter and started to struggle for the development of women education and also in the interest of Pakistan.

On 4 June I informed my children at the time of breakfast regarding the dream and stated that now I have decided to established a women's college in the name of Sir Syed Ahmed Khan, my children said that you have given full life to the people of Pakistan now it is the time for your rest because at this age it is impossible for you to do for the college. Thereafter she stated.

“After breakfast I gone out and started to contact with my various financial holder women”.

She (Late) always struggled without any fear and disturbances wherein the education of her family and background included in her struggle, therefore in spite of refuse from her children he given full attention for the establishment of women college and day and night included to fulfill the dream.

She was also a leading poet, she mention about the dream in a poetry.

Raheel Begum Sharwania also stated in her newspaper:

“27th June: Paper of Begum Siddiqui received to me wherein informed me that some respectable women and related persons of educational conference looking to meat you I have arrange meeting at the house of Begum Hafez you please come there when I arrived there I found Begum Siddiqui, Begum Hafeez, Begum Dr. Alvi, Dr. Begum Abdullah and from educational conference Altaf Ali Barelvi and Azeemuddin Khan were participated and it was suggested that various girl after passing Matric examination came to Karachi from Punjab, out of them the holder of First Division given admission in different college of Karachi but most of the girls are facing problems because there is no other educational institution form them, I suggested that the branch of educational conference of women was established in Aligarh so a women's college may be established in the name of Sir Syed Ahmed Khan in Karachi, because educational conference is held on the basis of his struggle.

Thereafter Raheel Begum stated that:

“Now the question is arisen that first of all struggle for the house for the college. Dr. Mrs. Abdullah stated that her house at Nazimabad is vacant but the said house was so inside the area hence not possible”.

28 June today in the morning after breakfast I visited to search the house in Nazimabad I contacted with the owner of house Shamim Ara she was educated from Aligarh College and she known me he very much happy in the name of Sir Syed College and offered me to take my house for your college, I told him that I am need immediately a house therefore along with her I inspected different houses and selected a house for the rent of Rs.400/- per month, but when the owner came to know that I am taking house for college the immediately increased the rent amount up to Rs.1200/-, therefore I not interested and visited first Chowrangi and inspected a school in Saeeda Manzil, the owner Zain-ul-Abedin of the said house was the cousin of my brother when I told him about the college he stated that the school management as made worst my premises therefore now I have decided not to give this house for education purpose, I told him that you are the student of Aligarh and refusing to give the house in the name of Sir Syed, thereafter the agreed and I paid him of Rs.100/- and taken the key of the house.

Thereafter late lady stated that:-

“I was very much happy I visited the house of Begum Sattar, Begum Alvi also arrived there when I told them about the house they were also happy and suggested to come for collection on account of furniture”.

29 June: Begum Alvi, Begum Siddiqui and myself visited for purchasing furniture and purchased some chairs, thereafter I took them at the house Saeeda Manzil and also met with the owner of the house Mr. Rizvi.

Mr. Rizvi also handed over some furniture for the time being, we prepared office room and thereafter we came back our houses.

30 June: A news regarding college was published in the newspaper and also wanted applications from the Lecturers and students.

1 July: From today we present in the building daily from morning to night and Mr. Azeemuddin was given the charge of Office Secretary and thereafter was established within four days with the struggle of Begum Siddiqui, Begum Hafeez, Begum Alvi and Dr. Begum Abdullah and myself, who given me full support and cooperation, hence during that time the women branch of educational conference was not established but Azeemuddin Khan always exist there and also performed the official work completely.

2 July: Today we received information for the meeting of educational conference in Sindh Madarsa therefore we all the five women Begum Siddiqui, Begum Hafeez, Begum Alvi and Dr. Begum Abdullah and myself attended at the office of Sindh Madarsa and now the problem regarding establishment of committee for women branch therefore 15 women were selected for college committee and from the male Azeemuddin Khan and Dr. Soofi as the Representative of educational conference included.

Now it is the need regarding women branch of educational conference and also selection of convener for performance of college committee, therefore Begum Alvi suggested my name as the convener, I told that the members of the committee having lot of experience, therefore select the convener from the male, I only given my life for this institution of Sir Syed, but with majority selected me as convener.

At the age of 88 years, Raheel Begum Sharwania died. After her death, the disturbances of 50 years women educational problem, freedom of Indian Muslim Women and in the establishment of struggle of women was ended.

== Movement Mirza Jawad Baig ==
Raheel Sharwania was born in 1894 to a famous family of Sherwani in Uttar Pradesh, her late father Nawab Moosa Khan was one of the leading personality of, he was also greatest leader of Freedom Movement and leading politician. Nawab Faiz Ahmed Khan, grandfather of Raheel Begum migrated to Hijaz when the Englishmen taken over the control in . Nawab Moosa Khan (Late) father of Raheel Begum was born in Holy Makkah, Nawab Faiz Ahmed Khan purchase lot of properties in Holy Makkah and Taif and also constructed houses, mosques, gardens etc. he was the leading man in Hijaz and called as “Khawaja Hindi” in all the Arab, he also constructed out of residential houses, one house just opposite Haram Sharif Mountain which is called as Jabl-e-Hindi. In 1877 when the Russian attack on the Turkey Nawab Faiz Ahmed Khan grandfather of Raheel Begum paid Rs.50,000/- to Khalifa Al-Muslimeen Sultan Abdul Hameed Khan as Financial Assistance and thereafter the Salami of eight guns made for late Nawab Sahib.

Nawab Moosa Khan late father of Raheel Begum Sharwania was born in Holy Makkah and after the death of his father he return to . He was a great writer on the basis of his ability and merit Sir Syd Ahmed Khan deputed him at the age of 19 years as the Trustee of M.A.O. College. During the early age he took interest in the country politics when day by day his participation in politics in increased. In the year 1903 he separated from Indian National Congress and invited all the leading personality of Indian Muslim at Aligarh, hence through this process separate political party started movement for the Muslims of India, on the basis of this movement in 1906 under the leadership of His Highness Sir Aga Khan Third mat with Lord Minto Viceroy of India and accepted the suggestion of separation.

The movement of Nawab Moosa Khan father of Raheel Begum established All India Muslim League in Dhaka in the year 1906 and Head Office of the party was remain in the residence of Nawab Sahib at Aligarh from 1906 to 1910. After establishment of Dhaka in 1908 held first meeting of All India Muslim League at Amritsar under the leadership of Late Nawab Sahib, as well as a combined meeting of Muslim League and Congress in 1917 held at Lakhnaw and he was the secretary, on the basis of efforts of Quaid-e-Azam Muhammad Ali Jinnah and Nawab Sahib and agreement was final in the said meeting which was called as “Lakhnaw Packet”, Late Nawab Moosa Khan father of Raheel Begum was the Secretary of Central Khilafat Committee and also President of UP Khilafat Committee, in the Bungalow of Nawab Sahib (Musharraf Manzil) wherein the Head Office of All India Muslim League was situated up to 4 years and on the top of the Central Politics of India year by year but also the said bungalow was used as the residence of leading personality of Hindu Muslim and other person, therefore birth of Raheel Begum Sharwania, her education, struggle for the freedom was made in the said period and also avoid all type of publicity and therefore the leadership of Government was given to her on the basis of full and successful life, she was selected as the member of Muslim League in the age of 12 years and in early ages she participated in the struggle of freedom.

In 1920 the marriage of Raheel Begum was held with the leading politician, management of Nawab Mir Mehboob Ali Khan Nizam-e-Dakan and the son Mirza Yahya Baig of Nawab Sarwar Jang Late but three years due to death of her husband she became widow and in spite of suggestion she did not arrange second marriage and he fully participated in the struggle of freedom and whole the life she worked for the Millat-e-Islamia and specially for the education of Muslim women.

After return from London in 1936 when Quaid-e-Azam Muhammad Ali Jinnah started new membership of Muslim League and called the first meeting of 9 leading Muslim Politicians including Nawab Moosa Khan, father of Raheel Begum, the said meeting was held in new constructed house of Quaid-e-Azam situated at Mount Pleasant Road Bombay, when Raheel Begum along with her late father arrived there, after introduction from Quaid-e-Azam she was allowed participate in the meeting because there was no representation from Muslim women in the said meeting, hence it is completed on the participation of daughter of Nawab Sahib.

Raheel Begum Sharwania was the permanent member of All India Muslim League Council but Quaid-e-Azam also selected as the member of All India Muslim Women Sub-Committee and she was remain the member till the exist of Pakistan. In 1938 Raheel Begum along with Begum Nawab Ismail Khan and MLA Begum Habibullah and other Muslim League Women from Lakhnaw visited different cities of and after day and night struggle she established All India Women Muslim League, its opening was held by Quaid-e-Azam at on .

Struggle for the Indian Muslim Freedom Raheel Begum also given special attention to the education of Muslim women, at that time M.A.O College of Sir Syed Ahmed Khan was very much popular wherein Nawab Moosa father of Raheel Begum also included in the trustees, when the Muslim women required for such organization, therefore Nawab Sahib given a large area of land for this purpose, when late Sheikh Abdullah taken this work he included Raheel Begum for the establishment of women school.

This school was so developed and thereafter it was granted the capacity of Residence College for Muslims Girls in India and was popular as Aligarh Muslim University Girls College, on the basis of full attention of Raheel Begum towards the women education, she was selected as the member of management committee of All India Muslim Educational Conference which was established by Sir Syed Ahmed Khan, she made great struggle for the establishment of residence college but also established various welfare organization for Muslim women in Aligarh wherein adult education and crafts. After existing of Pakistan Raheel Begum Sharwania shifted in Karachi along with her two sons Mirza Humayun Baig and Mirza Jawad Baig and fully involved in the development of Pakistan and Social Welfare work in the interest of women, in the beginning the residence of migrated peoples was the problem but on the basis of her full attention and struggle she given the priority to the migrated women residence and jobs. In 1948 Prime Minister of Pakistan Late Nawab Zada Liaquat Ali Khan established a rehabilitation and allotment committee and selected only women member to her.

Along with a rehabilitation of migrated women Raheel Begum also given attention to the women education, therefore after arrival in Karachi she contacted with her old friend and leading political member Late Noor-us-Saba Begum and established “Bazm-e-Amal Khawateen” on 18 November Karachi, and also established “Bazm-e-Amal Khawateen School” in the area of Gru Mandir New Town Karachi, thereafter which was known as “New Town Secondary School”.

In 1951 during the regime of Prime Minister Khawaja Nazimuddin when the foundation of Muslim Women League of Pakistan, Raheel Begum Sharwania was selected the First President but after removal of Late Khawaja Nazimuddin Government due to Governor General Ghulam Muhammad she very much upset and withdrawn herself from the politics forever.

In spite of public pressure and demand she never return and she given her remaining life for the development of women education and women welfare. In Karachi he saw in the dream that she was playing in early ages with Sir Syed Ahmed Khan and he raised his hand on they had of Raheel Begum as a daughter and stated to struggle for the development of women education and also in the interest of Pakistan.

She (Late) always struggled without any fear and disturbances wherein the education of her family and background included in her struggle, therefore in spite of refuse from her children he given full attention for the establishment of women college and day and night included to fulfill the dream.

At the time, funding for the establishment of colleges was often raised through public advertising and private financial support. Following a dream on June 6, 1953, Raheel Begum began organizing the establishment of a women's college. On June 28, she rented a house known as Saeeda Manzil in Nazimabad after paying one month's rent. On June 30, she placed newspaper advertisements announcing the establishment of Sir Syed Women College and inviting applications from prospective teachers.

A college committee was established late Raheel Begum was nominated as convener, therefore on the basis of one-month struggle only investment of Rs.100/- was established, for the development and construction of the college late Raheel Begum continuously worked for the remaining life.

At present Sir Syed Girls College is popular in Karachi. It was only the private college in the country owning its land and building, with a sufficient monthly income and bank balance at the time of nationalization, which was taken in the control of Government.

At 88 years Raheel Begum Sharwania died after a long illness. After her death, the disturbances of 50 years of women's educational problems and freedom, and the struggle of Indo-Paki women, and in the struggle of women was ended.
