= Syed Abdul Salam Shah =

Indian politician

Syed Abdul Salam Shah (born November 1897) was an Indian politician belonging to the Indian National Congress (INC), and a well-known freedom fighter. He belonged to Kaimganj, Farrukhabad. He served INC for more than 40 years till his death.

== Career ==
Syed Abdul Salam Shah was a soldier in Indian army and was posted in Iran. He was Minister of State of Food and Civil Supplies, Uttar Pradesh (1969–1971). Prior to this, he was elected as Member of Uttar Pradesh Legislative Council (1958–1962).

Thereafter, he came out as a winner in Kamalganj Constituency Election for Member of Uttar Pradesh Legislative Assembly (1969–1974) by defeating Babu Ram of Bhartiya Jana Sangh (BJS).

He served as President of District Board Farrukhabad. He was District President of INC, Farrukhabad for the longest term (more than 30 years).

He actively participated in Non-cooperation Movement (Asahiyog Andolan) led by Mohandas Karamchand Gandhi in 1921–1922. He also participated in Quit India Movement in 1942.

He was awarded for his great contribution to Indian National Congress by the Government in 1992, just few days before his death. Syed Abdul Salam Shah died on 6 December 1992, the day when Babri Masjid was demolished.
