= Gulam Rabbani Taban =

- Born: 14 February 1914; Kaimganj, Farrukhabad, Uttar Pradesh, India
- Died: 7 February 1993 (aged 78); Jamia Nagar, New Delhi, India
- Occupation: Urdu poet
- Awards: Padma Shri; Sahitya Akademi Award

Gulam Rabbani was an Indian lawyer and poet of Urdu literature who wrote under the nom de plume 'Taban'. He wrote several poems in Urdu, especially ghazals, and was known for his works, Zauq-i safar, Nava-e-avara, Poetics to politics and Saz-i larzan. He received the Sahitya Akademi award in 1979 for his work, Nava-e-avara. He was honoured by the Government of India in 1971 with Padma Shri, the fourth highest Indian civilian award.

== Biography ==
Gulam Rabbani was born at Kaimganj, a small hamlet in Farrukhabad district in the Indian state of Uttar Pradesh on 15 February 1914 in a rich family of Zamindars. He did his early schooling at the local village school and passed the intermediate examination from Aligarh. He graduated from St. John's College, Agra where he mixed with students most of whom were attracted to leftist ideology and took a degree in law.

Rabbani started writing during the college days under the pseudonym, Farchat but later, changed it to Taban. His leftist leanings got him into trouble with the British authorities and post independence, with the Indian law and order and he had to suffer incarceration on two occasions. Around this time, he joined Maktaba-e-Jamia, a Delhi-based publishing group and took to serious writing. He stayed with the organization for a number of years as its general manager till his retirement in 1975.

After retirement, he continued writing while engaging in journalism as well. The Government of India awarded him the civilian honour of Padma Shri in 1971. He received the Sahitya Akademi award in 1979 for his anthology, Nava-e-avara.

Rabbani had three sons and three daughters. Azra Rizvi, one of his daughters, was among the trio of writers, the others being Ajmal Ajmali and Sughra Mehdi, who wrote Rabbani's biography published by Mahnamah Kitab Numa, New Delhi in 1993 under the name, Ghulam Rabbani Taban : shakhsiyat aur adabi khidmat. He died in 1992.

== See also ==
- Ghazal
