= Mirza Khalil Ahmad Beg =

Indian linguist (born 1945)

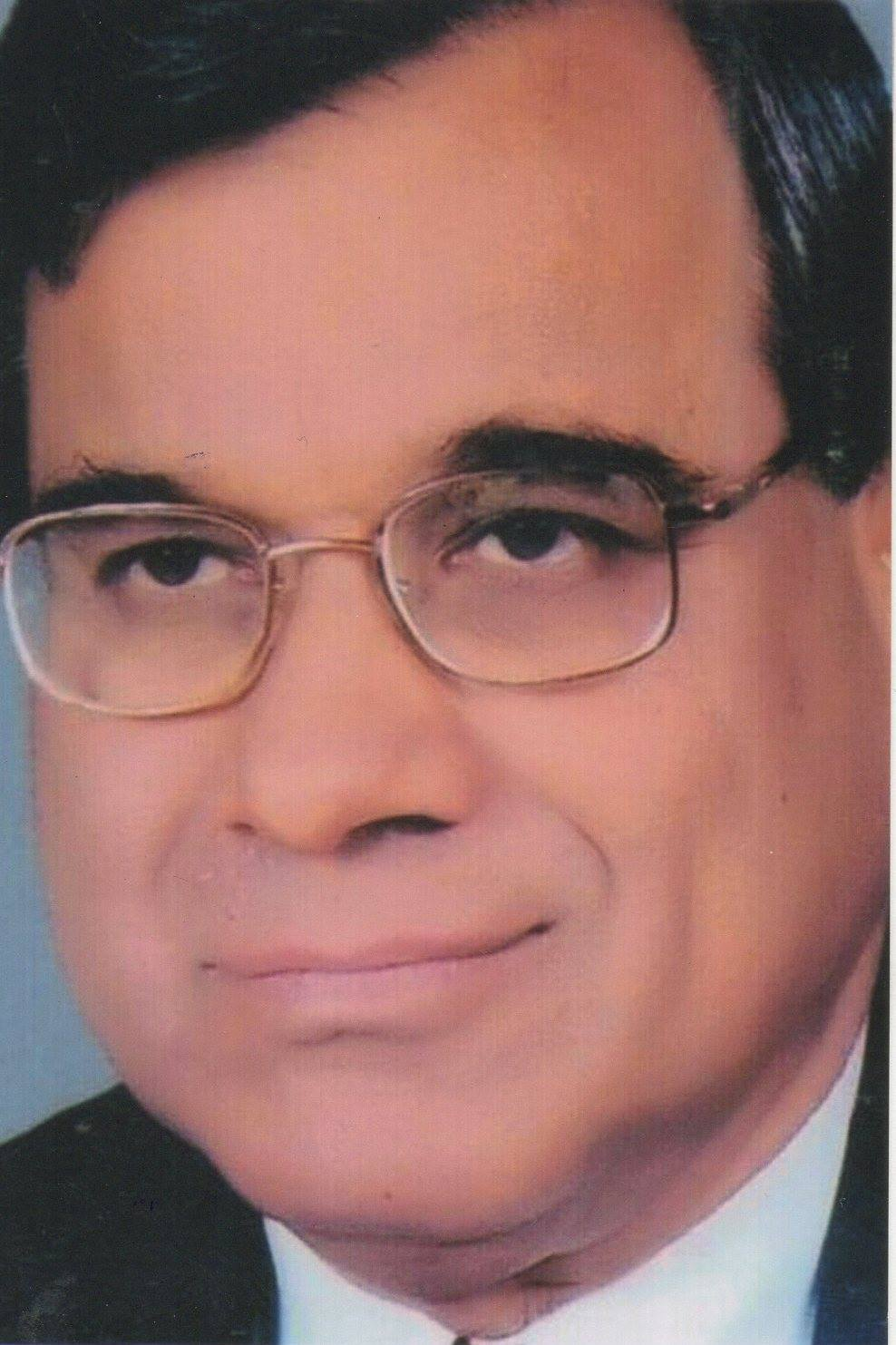
- Born: 1 January 1945 (age 81); Gorakhpur, United Provinces, British Raj (present-day Uttar Pradesh, India)
- Education: Aligarh Muslim University
- Occupations: Linguist, critic, writer, professor
- Writing career
- Language: Urdu (mainly), English
- Years active: 1970–present
- Genres: Linguistics, Literary criticism
- Subjects: Urdu Linguistics, Stylistics, Semantics
- Notable works: Urdu ki Lisani Tashkeel; Zaban, Usloob aur Usloobiyat; Urdu Zaban ki Tareekh

Mirza Khalil Ahmad Beg (Note: Urdu: مرزا خلیل احمد بیگ) (born 1 January 1945, Gorakhpur, UP, British Raj) is an Indian linguist, critic, and literary, primarily known for his contributions to the study of Urdu linguistics. He served as a professor and the head of the Department of Linguistics at Aligarh Muslim University (AMU), Aligarh, India. He was also a visiting faculty at Cornell University, United States.

== Early life and education ==
Mirza Khalil Ahmad Beg was born on 1 January 1945, in Gorakhpur, United Provinces (present day Uttar Pradesh), India. He completed his early education in Uttar Pradesh before pursuing advanced studies in linguistics. He earned his PhD in linguistics from Aligarh Muslim University.

== Career ==
Beg joined the Department of Linguistics at Aligarh Muslim University, where he became a professor and later served as the head of the department. His academic expertise includes phonetics, semantics, and stylistics, with a special focus on Urdu linguistics. He is also known for his research on the stylistic features of Urdu literature and the linguistic dynamics of South Asian languages. He was a visiting faculty member at Cornell University, where he contributed to research and teaching in South Asian linguistics.

== Notable works ==
Beg has authored over 20 books and numerous research articles. Some of his notable works include:

- Urdu ki Lisani Tashkeel (The Linguistic Formation of Urdu)
- Urdu Zaban ki Tareekh (History of Urdu language)
- Zaban, Usloob aur Usloobiyat (Language, Style, and Stylistics)
- Bhasha Vigyan aur Urdu (Linguistics and Urdu)
- Urdu Phonetics and Phonology
- Urdu Grammar: History & Structure
- Psycholinguistics and Language Acquisition
- Sociolinguistic perspective of Hindi and Urdu in India
