= Turf War (TV series) =

American reality television series

- Starring: Matt Blashaw
- Country of origin: United States
- No. of episodes: 27

Original release
- Release: March 8, 2010 – present

Turf War is an American reality television series. A spinoff from the Yard Crashers series, Turf War began on March 8, 2010 on the DIY Network. Season two began on April 11, 2011.

The original host of the series was Ahmed Hassan. He was replaced at the end of 2011 by contractor Matt Blashaw.
