= Haroon Khan Sherwani =

Indian historian (1891–1980)

- Born: 1898; Aligarh, British India
- Died: 1980 (aged 81–82)
- Occupations: Historian, author and academic
- Relatives: Rahil Begum Sherwani (sister)
- Awards: Padma Bhushan

Academic background
- Education: Aligarh Muslim University; University of Grenoble; University of Geneva

Prof Haroon Khan Sherwani (1891–1980) was an Indian historian, scholar, and author. Maulana Azad National Urdu University had created Centre for Deccan Studies in his honor.

== Education ==
Haroon Khan Sherwani was born in 1891 to Haji Muhammad Musa Khan Sherwani. He was educated in Aligarh Muslim University, London, Cambridge, Oxford, Grenoble and Geneva. At the age of 15, he went to London to pursue higher education. There he went on to receive degrees from both the University of Cambridge and the University of Oxford. He was called to the bar two years later. He also spent extensive time studying French at the University of Grenoble in France and the University of Geneva in Switzerland. He became head of the Department of History and Political Science at Osmania University and was later appointed Principal of Nizam College, Hyderabad (1945–1946) and then of Anglo-Arabic College, Delhi (1947–1948). Professor Sherwani was a scholar of Urdu, Hindi, Arabic, English, French, and Persian, and made significant contributions to the study of Deccan history.

== Awards and distinctions ==
- Padma Bhushan given by the Government of India to recognize his contributions in the field of literature and education in 1969
- Honorary Doctor of Letters, Aligarh University, 1976
- Elected Fellow of the Royal Asiatic Society of Great Britain, London, 1978
- President, Non-European History Section, VIII International Congress of Historical Sciences, Zurich, 1938
- President, Medieval Section, Indian History Congress, 1943
- President, Fifteenth Indian Political Science Conference, Alighar, 1952
- Member, Indian Delegation to the Commonwealth Relations Conference, Lahore, 1953
- President, Indian History Congress. Jubilee Session, Poona, 1963
- President, Central and South Asian Section, International Conference of Asian History, Hong Kong also known as capital of china (H.K), 1964
- Member, Committee appointed by Indian Parliament to translate the Constitution of India into Urdu

== Prominent books ==
- Muslim Political Thought and Administration by Haroon Khan Sherwani

Publisher: Munhshiram Manoharlal; 1st Indian edition (1981); 215 pages

This book is a comprehensive study of the political theories of Muslim thinkers. His survey of Muslim political thought begins with the Ideal State as depicted in the Quran. He provides an insight into the working of the political minds of some of the most eminent Muslim thinkers of each era. Alongside the author provides a running commentary about the workings of the political institutions under which they lived in order to find out whether there was any connecting link between their political ideas and the atmosphere in which they flourished.

- The Bahmanis of Deccan by Haroon Khan Sherwani

Publisher: Munshiram Manoharlal Publishers Pvt. Ltd. New Delhi, India 1985; 364 pages

Bahmani history covers a very important part of the history of medieval India and corresponds to the period of a unified Deccan. Pre-Bahmani medieval Deccan extended to just half century when the land was governed rather precariously by the Sultans of Delhi, while the two countries between the fall of the Bahmanis and the establishment of the Asaf jahi rule was a period of complete disunion. Perhaps the first attempt at a comprehensive history of a part of the Bahmani rule was made by Professor Sherwani in his book, Mahmud Gawan, the great Bahmani Wazir which was published in 1941. The book was exceedingly well received. The age of Mahmud Gawan forms only a small though a glorious part of the history of Bahmani Deccan which is now being presented to the learned public.

- Studies in the Foreign Relations of India, from the earliest times to 1947 by Haroon Khan Sherwani

Publisher: Govt. of Andhra Pradesh, Hyderabad, India 1975.

- Cultural Trends in Medieval India: Architecture, Painting, Literature & Language by Haroon Khan Sherwani

Publisher: Bombay, New York, Asia Publication House 1968.

- History of Medieval Deccan, 1295-1724 by Haroon Khan Sherwani

Publisher: Printing and Publication Bureau, Govt. of Andhra Pradesh (1973)

- Cultural Understanding in Medieval India by Haroon Khan Sherwani

Publisher: Hyderabad, Deccan; 1962

- History of the Qutb Shahi dynasty by Haroon Khan Sherwani

Publisher: Munshiram Manoharlal Publishers (1974); 739 pages

- The Bahmani Kingdom by Haroon Khan Sherwani

Publisher: National Information & Publications (1947)

- Mahmud Gawan, the Great Bahmani Wazir by Haroon Khan Sherwani

Publisher: Allahabad: Kitabistan, 1942.

- Muhammad-Quli Qutb Shah, founder of Haidarabad by Haroon Khan Sherwani

Publisher: London, Asia Publication House, 1967.

- Sultan Muhammad Qutb Shah by Haroon Khan Sherwani

Publisher: Karachi, Pakistan Historical Society, 1962.

- The Origin of Islamic Polity: the Qur'anic State by Haroon Khan Sherwani

Publisher: Hyderabad : Deccan, 1936.

- A Muslim Political Thinker of the 9th century, A.C. by Haroon Khan Sherwani

Publisher: Allahabad: Kitabistan, 1942

- Muslim Colonies in France, Northern Italy and Switzerland by Haroon Khan Sherwani

Publisher: Pakistan : Sh. Muhammad Ashraf, 1955.

- The Islamic Conception of Sovereignty by Haroon Khan Sherwani

Publisher: Woking Muslim Mission and Literary Trust (1957)

- Five Great Oriental Political Philosophers by Haroon Khan Sherwani

Publisher: Hyderabad Printing Works (1934)

== Major translations ==
- Urdu translation of Adolf Holm's History of Ancient Greece
- Member, Committee for the Urdu translation of the Constitution of India
- English translation of Joseph Toussaint Reinaud's French book entitled Invasions des sarrazinz en France, et de France en Savoie en Piedmont et en Suisse published in 1836
