= Nawabganj Assembly constituency =

Constituency of the Uttar Pradesh legislative assembly in India

Coordinates: 25.4833°N 87.2833°E

Nawabganj
- Constituency No. 121 for the Uttar Pradesh Legislative Assembly

Constituency details
- Country: India
- Region: North India
- State: Uttar Pradesh
- District: Bareilly
- Total electors: 257,842 (2012)
- Reservation: None

Member of Legislative Assembly
- 18th Uttar Pradesh Legislative Assembly
- Incumbent M P Arya
- Party: Bhartiya Janta Party
- Elected year: 2022

Nawabganj Assembly constituency is one of the 403 constituencies of the Uttar Pradesh Legislative Assembly, India. It is a part of the Bareilly district and one of the five assembly constituencies in the Bareilly Lok Sabha constituency. First election in this assembly constituency was held in 1952 after the "DPACO (1951)" (delimitation order) was passed in 1951. After the "Delimitation of Parliamentary and Assembly Constituencies Order" was passed in 2008, the constituency was assigned identification number 121.

== Wards / areas ==
Nawabganj Assembly constituency is coterminous with Nawabganj Tehsil.

== Members of the Legislative Assembly ==
Election	Name	Party
1952	Nawrang Lal	Indian National Congress
1957	Sheo Raj Bahadur	Praja Socialist Party
1962	Naurang Lal	Indian National Congress
1967	C. R. Pachpra	Bharatiya Jana Sangh
1969	Chetram Gangwar	Bharatiya Jana Sangh
1974	Chetram Gangwar	Indian National Congress
1977	Chetram Gangwar	Indian National Congress
1980	Chetram Gangwar	Independent
1985	Chetram Gangwar	Indian National Congress
1989	Gedanlal Gangwar	Bharatiya Janata Party
1991	Bhagwat Saran Gangwar	Bharatiya Janata Party
1993	Bhagwat Saran Gangwar	Bharatiya Janata Party
1996	Chotey Lal Yadav	Samajwadi Party
2002	Bhagwat Saran Gangwar	Samajwadi Party
2007	Bhagwat Saran Gangwar	Samajwadi Party
2012	Bhagwat Saran Gangwar	Samajwadi Party
2017	Kesar Singh Gangwar	Bharatiya Janata Party
2022	Dr. M. P. Arya	Bharatiya Janata Party

== Election results ==
=== 2027 ===
2027 Uttar Pradesh Legislative Assembly election: Nawabganj
Party	Candidate	Votes	%	±%
INDIA				
NDA				
BSP				
NOTA	None of the above			
Majority				
Turnout				
gain from		Swing		

=== 2022 ===
2022 Uttar Pradesh Legislative Assembly election: Nawabganj
Party	Candidate	Votes	%	±%
BJP	Dr. M.P. Arya	111,113	48.2	▲4.68
SP	Bhagwat Saran Gangwar	101,876	44.2	▲18.86
BSP	Yusuf Khan	11,083	4.81	▼3.99
NOTA	None of the above	1,451	0.63	▼0.24
Majority		9,237	4.0	▼14.18
Turnout		230,503	67.89	▼0.46
BJP hold		Swing		

=== 2017 ===
2017 Uttar Pradesh Legislative Assembly Election: Nawabganj
Party	Candidate	Votes	%	±%
BJP	Kesar Singh Gangwar	93,711	43.52	
SP	Bhagwat Saran Gangwar	54,569	25.34	
Ittehad-E-Millait Council	Shaila Tahir	36,761	17.07	
BSP	Virendera Singh Gangwar	18,948	8.8	
NOTA	None of the above	1,860	0.87	
Majority		39,142	18.18	
Turnout		215,339	68.35	
BJP gain from SP		Swing		

=== 2012 ===
2012 Uttar Pradesh Legislative Assembly election: Nawabganj
Party	Candidate	Votes	%	±%
SP	Bhagwat Saran Gangwar	67,022	35.58	−
BSP	Usha Singh Gangwar	49,303	26.17	−
PECP	Mohd. Islam	38,415	20.39	−
	Remainder 11 candidates	33,630	17.85	−
Majority		17,719	9.41	−
Turnout		188,370	73.06	−
SP hold		Swing		

== See also ==
- Bareilly district
- Bareilly Lok Sabha constituency
- Sixteenth Legislative Assembly of Uttar Pradesh
- Uttar Pradesh Legislative Assembly
- Vidhan Bhawan
