= Gangwal =

Gangwal is a surname. Notable people with the surname include:

- Mala Ram Gangwal (born 1949), Indian politician
- Mishrilal Gangwal (1902–1981), Indian politician
- Rakesh Gangwal (born 1952/1953), Indian-American billionaire businessman
