= E. S. Lloyd =

Indian civil servant

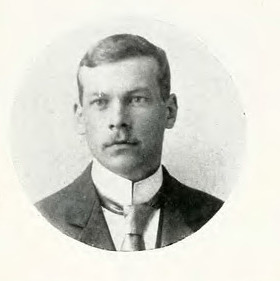
- Born: 26 May 1870; Wednesbury
- Died: 1945 (aged 74–75)

Ernest Sampson Lloyd, CSI, JP (26 May 1870 – 7 August 1945) was an Indian civil servant who served as the president of Madras Corporation from 1906 to 1910. Lloyd's Road in Chennai, India is named after him.

== Early life and education ==
Born in England, Lloyd was born in Wednesbury on 26 May 1870 and educated at Clifton College and Lincoln College, Oxford. He passed the Indian Civil Service examinations of 1893 and was appointed to the Madras cadre.

== Personal life ==
Lloyd married Mary Young at Droitwich on 8 June 1899 and had three sons—William Anthony Sampson Lloyd, Philip Montague Lloyd and Charles Christopher Lloyd.

== Career ==
Lloyd arrived in Madras on 21 December 1894 and served as assistant collector and magistrate. In September 1902, he was appointed District Collector and magistrate, Bangalore.

Lloyd was appointed president of Madras Corporation in 1906 and served till 1910.

== Later life ==
In his later life, Lloyd served as revenue secretary and finance secretary of Madras Presidency. For a brief while in 1923, he also acted as Chief Secretary. Lloyd died in 1945.

Lloyd was made a Companion of the Order of the Star of India in the New Year Honours of 1924.
