= Qadirganj =

Kadarganj pukhta Kadarganj pukhta कादरगंज पुख्ता
- town
- Quadar ganj
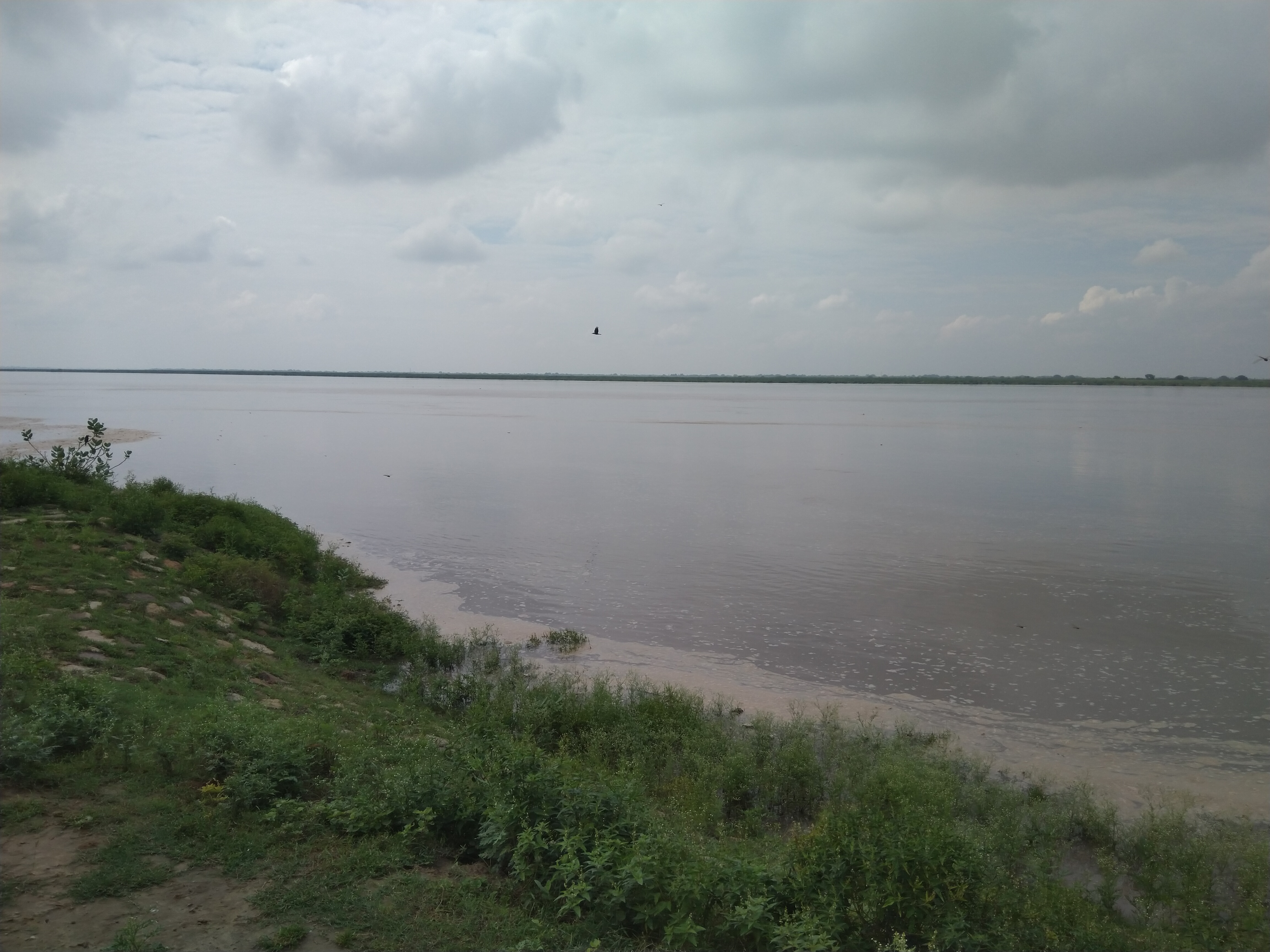

- Location in Uttar Pradesh, India Kadarganj pukhta (India)
- Coordinates: 27°47′N 79°04′E
- Country: India
- State: Uttar Pradesh

Languages
  - Official: Hindi
- Time zone: UTC+5:30 (IST)
- Vehicle registration: UP
- Website: up.gov.in

Qadarganj, also spelled Kadarganj, is a city in the Etah Zila of Uttar Pradesh, India. Qadirganj is home to the Patna Bird Sanctuary and the city's access points are the Ganj Dundwara Railway Station and Agra Civil Enclaves.
