= Bhikampur and Datawali (Aligarh) State =

Bhikampur and Datawali
- Principality under the nominal sovereignty of Mughal Empire and Maratha Confederacy and British India
- 1703–1947
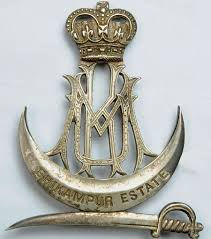
- Coat of arms
- History
  - Established: 1703
  - Independence of India: 1947
Preceded by	Succeeded by
Mughal Empire	India
- Today part of: Aligarh, Uttar Pradesh, Uttar Pradesh, India

The Bhikampur and Datawali principality is in Aligarh, Uttar Pradesh. For nearly four centuries, before the advent of British Raj in India, it was ruled by the descendants of a Sherwani Pathan from Jalalabad in Afghanistan. The Sherwani clan were practically independent rulers in the period between the collapse of Mughal Empire and the rise of the British Raj.

== History ==
The clan had two main branches, the lineage of Bhikampur and that of Datawali, and practiced cousin marriage to an almost exclusive degree. The family tree presents a bewildering array of interlocking relationships. Their marriage patterns kept the family properties intact, while taking a toll on the health of their increasingly inbred offspring. The Sherwanis were a family that displayed an intriguing combination of the progressive and the conservative: They were supporters of education, whether Islamic or western, and promoters of education for women, although the women of the family maintained strict purdah and were educated at home. Their loyalist politics were manifested in civic service and membership in reform associations, along with resistance to the growing forces of anti-British activism before and after World War I.

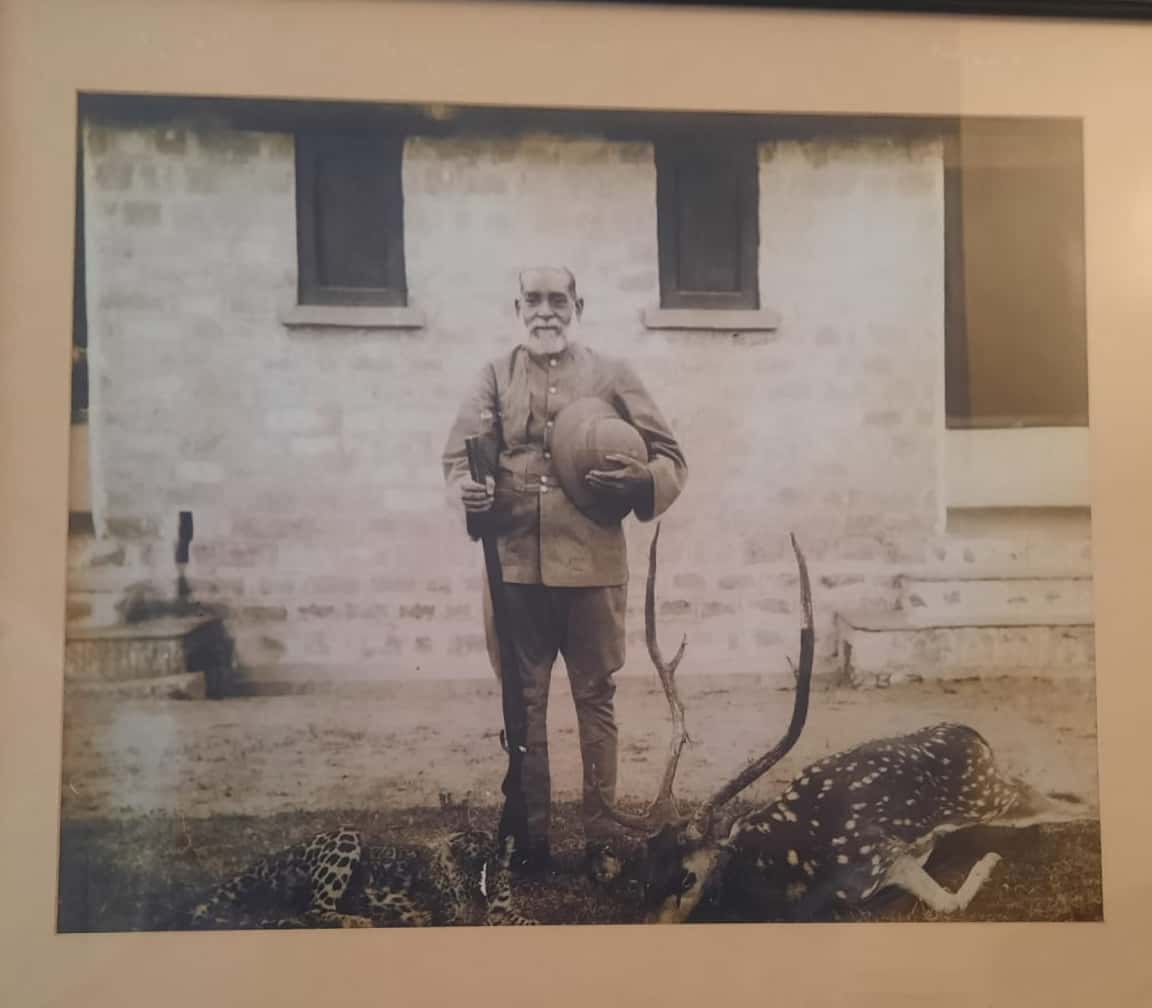
Sir Muhammad Muzammilullah Khan

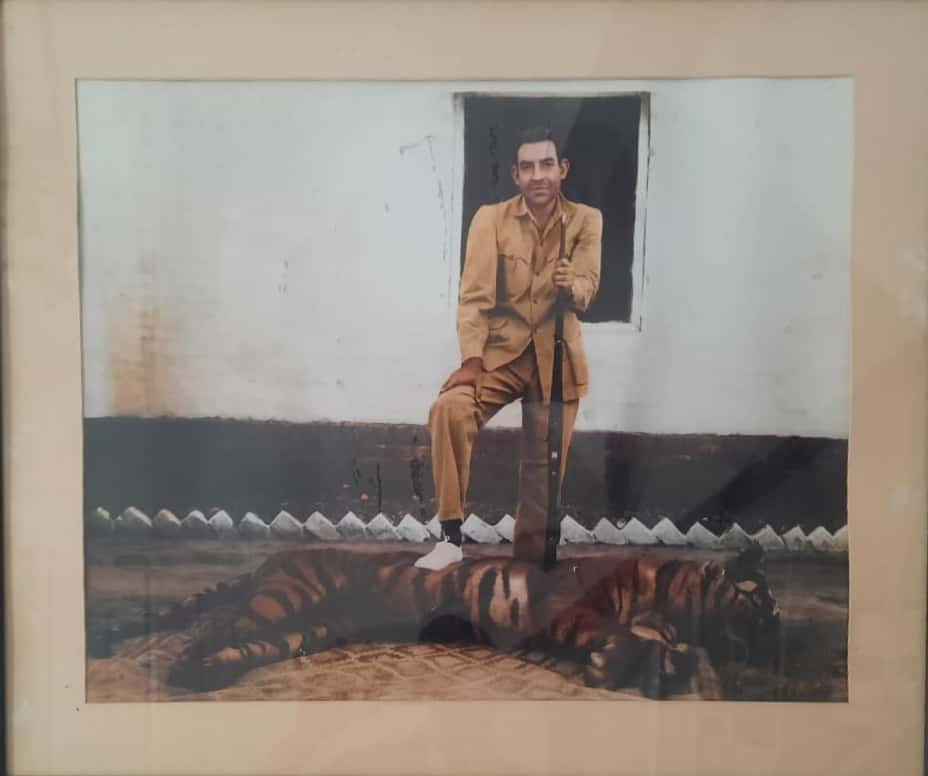
Nawab Rehmat Ullah Khan Sherwani

== Notable members ==
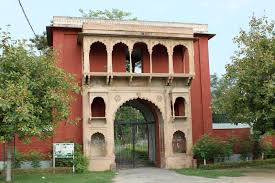
Bhikampur Gate, Aligarh Muslim University

The Sherwani clan of Aligarh district produced a number of notable people:

- Zahida Khatun Sherwani (1894-1922):( Bhikampur ) : Daughter of Nawab Sir Muzammil Ullah Khan Sherwani, An Indian poet and writer who wrote under pen name Zay Khay Sheen in the Urdu language and was also an activist for women's rights.
- Masud Husain Khan (1919-2010): the Father of Urdu-Linguistics, and the fifth Vice-Chancellor of Jamia Millia Islamia. He was married to Nawab Faiz Ahmed Khan's great-granddaughter.
