= Katiyar =

Kurmi Surname

Katiyar is an Indian surname of Brij origin, primarily used by the people of the Kurmi caste in North India. It is derived from the word "Katar", meaning sword. Notable people with the surname include:

- Manoj Kumar Katiyar
- Prem Lata Katiyar (born 1946), member of Uttar Pradesh Legislative Assembly
- Sarvagya Singh Katiyar (1935–2018), former Vice Chancellor of CSJM University Kanpur
- Vinay Katiyar (born 1954), founder of Bajrang Dal
- Neelima Katiyar, former member of Uttar Pradesh Legislative Assembly from Kalyanpur, Uttar Pradesh Assembly constituency.
