= Kesar Singh =

Indian politician (died 2021)

Kesar Singh Gangwar (1956/57 – 28 April 2021) was an Indian politician and member of the Bharatiya Janata Party.

He represented Nawabganj in the Uttar Pradesh Legislative Assembly from 2017 until his death on 28 April 2021 from COVID-19 at age 64 in Noida.
