= Chetram Gangwar =

Indian politician

Chetram Gangwar (died 11 December 2006) was a politician from Uttar Pradesh, India. He was a minister in the Government of Uttar Pradesh and was a member of the Uttar Pradesh Legislative Assembly for over twenty years, as the elected representative for Nawabganj constituency. He was born in the village pachpera (Nawabganj)in Bareilly Uttar Pradesh. Former Chief Minister Mulayam Singh Yadav recalled Gangwar's services for the landless and farmers in the Rohilkhand region.
