= Muhammad Muzammilullah Khan =

Nawab Sir Muhammad Muzammilullah Khan Sherwani KCIE OBE
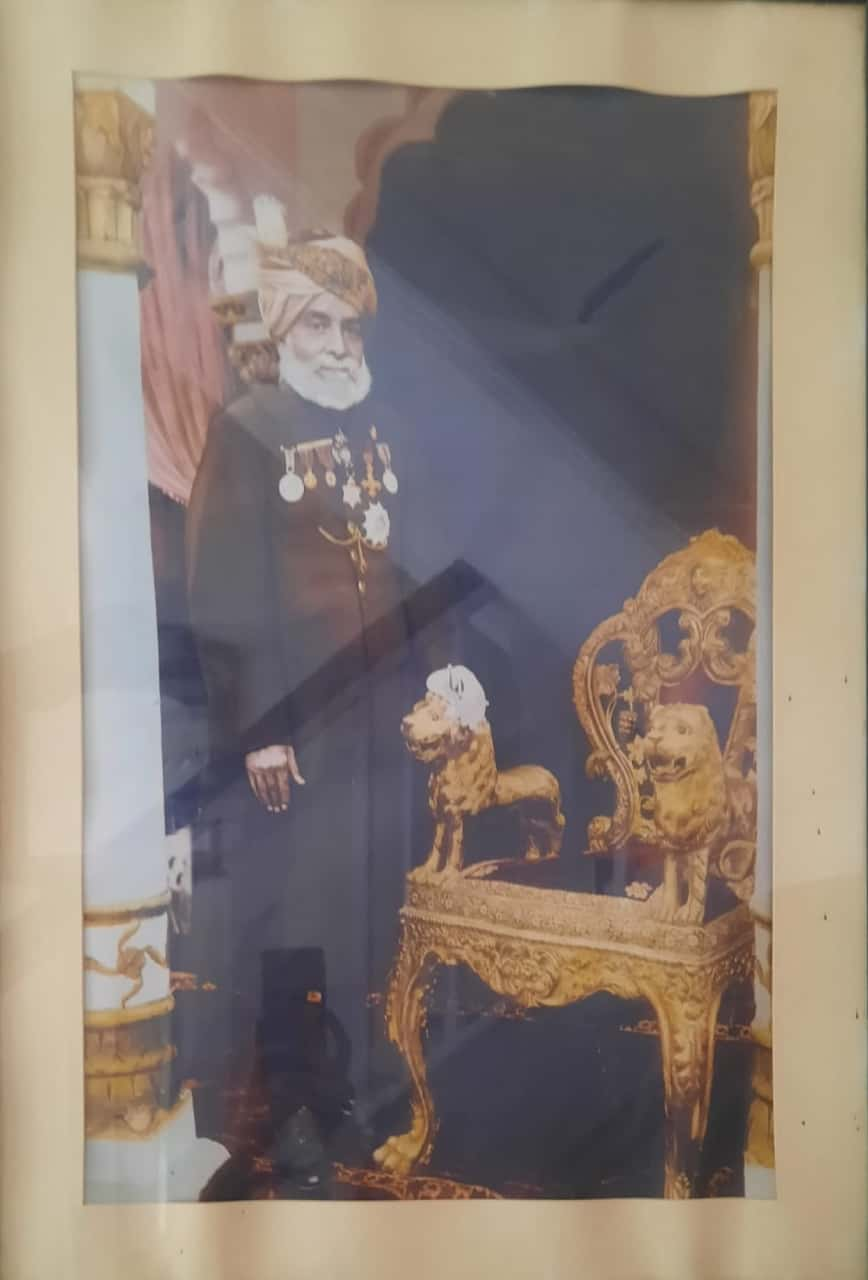
- Born: 1865
- Died: 1935 (aged 69–70)
- Political party: All-India Muslim League

Nawab Sir Muhammad Muzammilullah Khan Sherwani (1865–1935) was a noted zamindar and politician from the United Province of British India.

He was former Vice Chancellor of Aligarh Muslim University. He was made one of the trustees of Muhammadan Anglo-Oriental College, Aligarh in 1886 and a fellow of Allahabad University. He was one of the Old Party leaders of All-India Muslim League and staunch opponent of Young Party faction. He was one of the signatories to the 1906 Muslim Memorial and was involved in 1909 agitation for separate electorates for Muslims and was among the member of all-India delegation of Muslims led by Sir Aga Khan III to meet with Viceroy Lord Minto in order to demand a separate Legislative Council for Muslims. He held his estate in Bhikampur in Aligarh district.

He was nominated member of United Province Legislative Council for the years 1916-19. Also a member of Viceroy's Council of State and twice home member of United Province government.

He served as Secretary of the Zamindars' Association, United Provinces and was also made Special magistrate by the government. He also served as president of UP Muslim Defense Association in 1917. He was born in noted Sherwani clan of Aligarh.

He was made Khan Bahadur in 1904 and given personal title of the Nawab in 1910. He was appointed an Officer of the Order of the British Empire in the 1919 New Year Honours, and invested as a Knight Commander of the Order of the Indian Empire in the 1924 New Year Honours. He died in 1938.
