= Bhagwat Saran Gangwar =

Indian politician

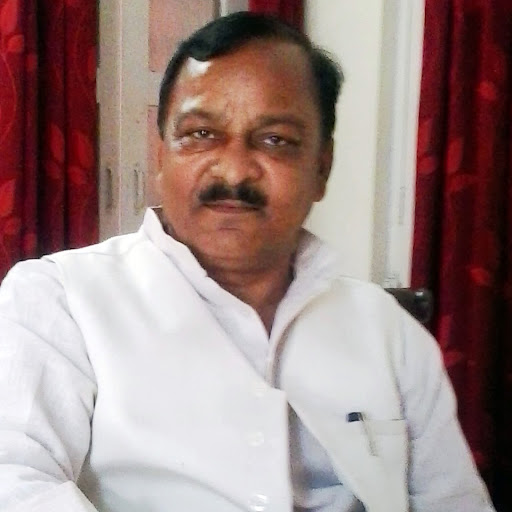
- Bhagwat Saran Gangwar
- Born: Nawabganj, Bareilly
- Occupation: Politician
- Political party: Samajwadi Party

Bhagwat Saran Gangwar is an Indian politician and the former Minister of State for Small Scale Industries and Export Promotion in the government of Uttar Pradesh. He is also a five-time MLA from Nawabganj, and also the Health Minister of Uttar Pradesh during the SP government in 2003. He is the Samajwadi Party member representing Nawabganj constituency in the Uttar Pradesh Legislative Assembly.

== Personal life ==
He was born to Chunni Lal in the village of Ahamdabad of Nawabganj tehsil, Bareilly district, Uttar Pradesh, India.
