= Kalindi Express =

Train in India

Overview
- Service type: Express
- Locale: Haryana, Delhi & Uttar Pradesh
- Current operator: North Western Railway

Route
- Termini: Bhiwani Junction (BNW); Prayagraj Junction (PRYJ)
- Stops: 30
- Distance travelled: 800 km (497 mi)
- Average journey time: 17h 45m
- Service frequency: Daily
- Train number: 14723 / 14724

On-board services
- Classes: AC 2 Tier, AC 3 Tier, Sleeper class, General Unreserved
- Seating arrangements: Yes
- Sleeping arrangements: Yes
- Catering facilities: On-board catering, E-catering
- Baggage facilities: Available

Technical
- Rolling stock: LHB
- Track gauge: 1,676 mm (5 ft 6 in); Broad Gauge
- Operating speed: 45 km/h (28 mph) average including halts.

The 14723 / 14724 Kalindi Express is an Express train by the Indian Railways that connects Prayagraj Junction in Uttar Pradesh to Bhiwani Junction in Haryana. The train running from Bhiwani to Kanpur is numbered 14724 while the train from Prayagraj to Bhiwani is numbered 14723.

== Crashes ==
- On 20 August 1995, a train operating the service collided with Purushottam Express near Firozabad at 02:55 a.m. on the Delhi–Kanpur section. The Firozabad rail disaster was the second deadliest rail crash in Indian history. Estimates vary, but at least 368 people were killed. The first train (Kalindi Express) from Kanpur struck a cow but was unable to proceed as its brakes were damaged. It was then struck from behind at a speed of 100 kmph by the Purushottam Express from Puri. Three carriages of the Kalindi Express were destroyed, the engine and the front two carriages of the Purushottam Express were derailed. Most of the 2,200 passengers aboard the two trains were asleep at the time of the collision.
- On 16 January 2010, three people were killed and 14 injured when the Kalindi Express rammed into Kanpur Central-bound Shram Shakti Express near Tundla Junction due to dense morning fog.

== Route and halts ==
The train runs from Bhiwani via Bhiwani City, Lahli, Rohtak Junction, Shakur Basti, Old Delhi, Delhi Shahdara Junction, Ghaziabad, Khurja Junction, Aligarh, Tundla, Firozabad, Shikohabad, Mainpuri, Bhongaon, Nibkarori Farrukhabad Junction, Kannauj, Kanpur Anwarganj to Kanpur to Prayagraj.

Route for 14723 from Kanpur to Bhiwani:

Station code	Station name	Arrival	Departure
CNB	Kanpur Central	Starting Station	17:25
CPA	Kanpur Anwarganj	17:32	17:40
KAP	Kalyanpur	17:53	17:55
BJR	Barrajpur	18:16	18:18
BLU	Bilhaur	18:33	18:35
KJN	Kannauj	18:56	19:01
GHJ	Gursahaiganj	19:23	19:25
KLJ	Kamalganj	19:40	19:42
FGR	Fatehgarh	20:02	20:04
FBD	Farrukhabad Jn	20:30	21:05
BGQ	Bhongaon	21:55	21:58
MNQ	Mainpuri	22:25	22:30
SKB	Shikohabad Jn	23:45	23:50
	Next day		
FZD	Firozabad	00:21	00:26
TDL	Tundla Jn	01:00	01:05
ALJN	Aligarh Jn	02:17	02:22
KRJ	Khurja Jn	02:52	02:54
GZB	Ghaziabad Junction	04:35	04:37
DSA	Delhi Shahdara Junction	04:56	04:58
DLI	Delhi Junction	05:35	05:50
DKZ	Delhi Kishanganj	06:03	06:05
SSB	Shakurbasti	06:19	06:21
BGZ	Bahadurgarh	06:38	06:40
SPZ	Sampla	06:54	06:56
ROK	Rohtak Jn	07:50	08:10
LHLL	Lahli	08:22	08:24
KLNK	Kalanaur Kalan	08:32	08:34
KHRK	Kharak	08:44	08:45
BMLL	Bamla	08:54	08:55
BNWC	Bhiwani City	09:06	09:07
BLW	Bhiwani Junction	09:25	Destination station

== Equipment ==
back in 1995 was hauled by WDM-2. Before It was hauled by a Jhansi-based WDP-4D diesel locomotive from Bhiwani to Farrukhabad Jn. Now an Kanpur-based WAP-7 or a WAP-4 Electric locomotive from Farrukhabad Jn. to Kanpur Central. The train was later operated by an electric locomotive. this time train oprete by electric locomotives.
