= Kamalganj =

- Town
- Location in Uttar Pradesh, India
- Coordinates: 27.27°N 79.65°E
- Country: India
- State: Uttar Pradesh
- District: Farrukhabad
- Elevation: 135 m (443 ft)

Population (2001)
  - Total: 14,659

Languages
  - Official: Hindi
- Time zone: UTC+5:30 (IST)
- PIN: 209724

Kamalganj is a town and a nagar panchayat in Farrukhabad district in the Indian state of Uttar Pradesh. The town is one of the key contributors to Potato production in the district.

== Geography ==
Kamalganj is located at 27.27°N 79.65°E. It has an average elevation of 135 metres (442 feet).

== Demographics ==
As of 2001 India census, Kamalganj had a population of 14,659. Males constitute 54% of the population and females 46%. Kamalganj has an average literacy rate of 56%, lower than the national average of 59.5%: male literacy is 62%, and female literacy is 50%. In Kamalganj, 17% of the population is under 6 years of age. A large chunk of the Muslim population of Farrukhabad lives within the circumference of Kamalganj block with villages like Saraiya and Shekhpur Rustampur being predominantly Muslim.

== Culture ==
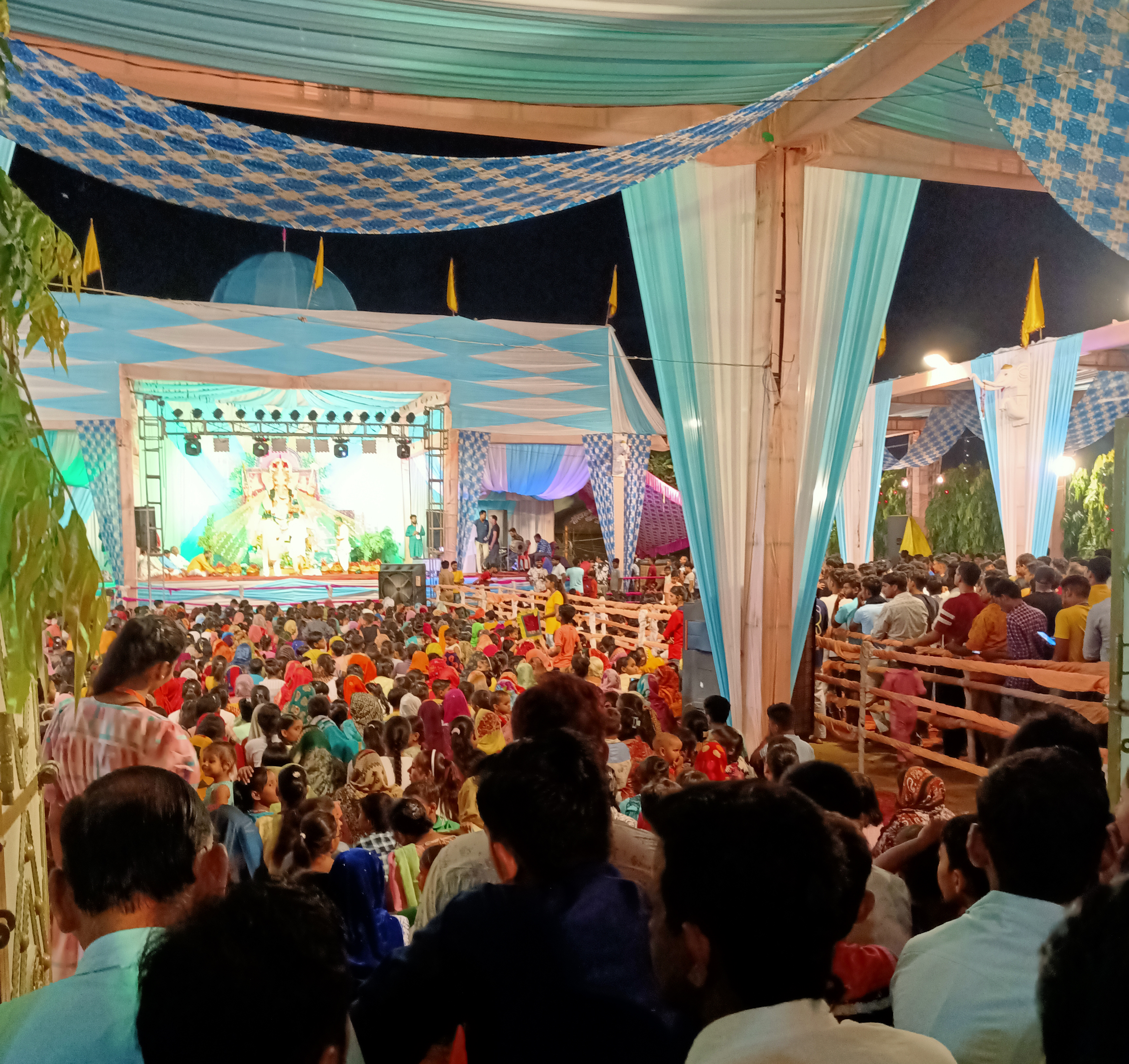
Ganesh Chaturthi Celebration in Kamalganj

Being one of the major towns of Farrukhabad, Kamalganj remains to be influenced by district culture. So called 'Farrukhabadi' dialect of Hindi is observable among local people along with Muslim majority speaking Urdu. Festival of colours, Holi is celebrated for eight days in the town, unlike almost all places in India. This whole eight-day celebration is known as 'Holi Milan', locally. Other prominently observed festivals in the town are Diwali and Eid. In the last few years, the public celebration of Ganesh Chaturthi has also gained momentum.

Inhibited on the banks of the River Ganges, important Pilgrimage centers around Kamalganj are Singhirampur and Bhojpur. Many devotees from the town visit these sites by foot on the occasion of Kartika Purnima.

== Education ==
Despite being a small town, Kamalganj has few Intermediate and one degree college within town boundaries, helping neighboring rural areas. All intermediate colleges are affiliated by Uttar Pradesh Madhyamik Shiksha Parishad, Allahabad. One degree college, which recently started with postgraduate courses in Arts has affiliation with Chhatrapati Shahu Ji Maharaj University, Kanpur, also known as Kanpur University. For postgraduation courses in Science, Commerce and Technology, inhabitants are dependent on major cities nearby, such as Kanpur.

== Transport ==
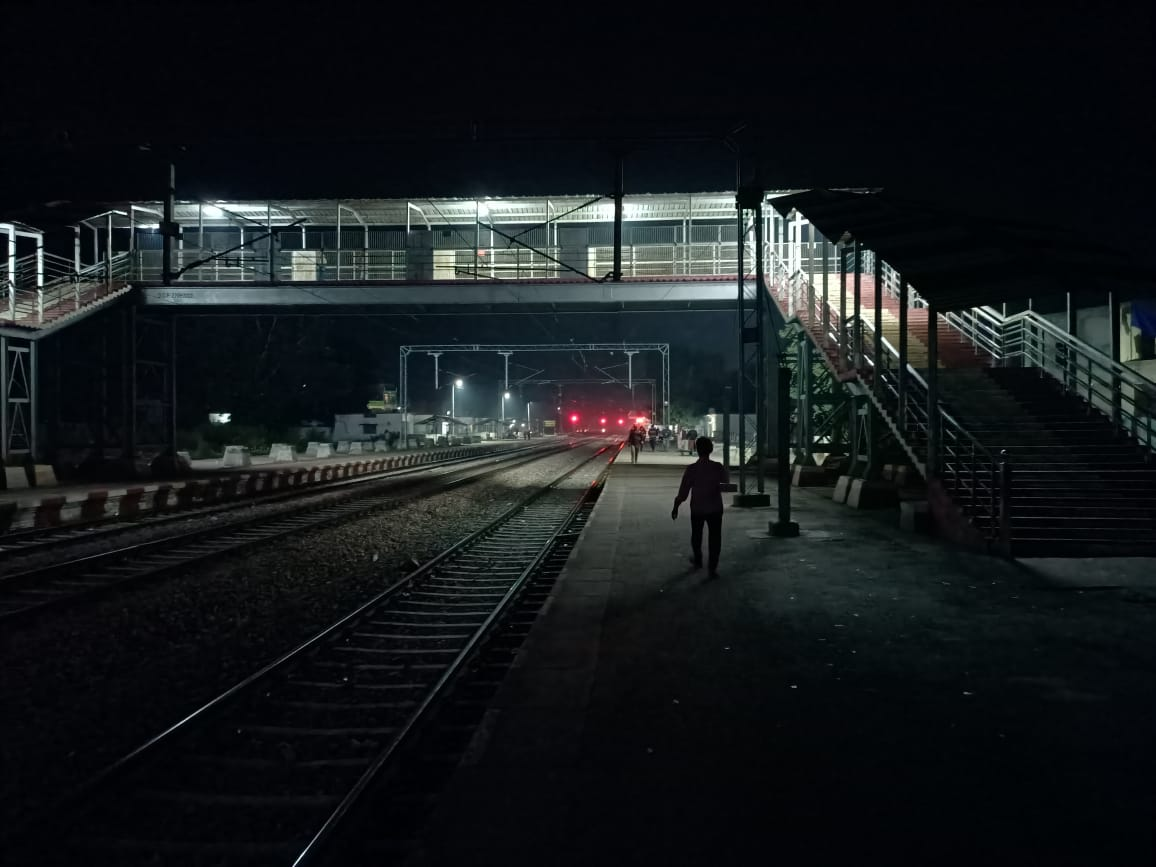
Kamalganj Railway Station

Kamalganj has a railway station, situated in the center of town. The station is coded as KLJ under the Indian Railway Stations Code dictionary. 4 km away from both sides, its neighboring stations are Yaqutganj and Singhirampur. A broad gauge line connects Kamalganj railway station to Kanpur via Kannauj and to Kasganj via Farrukhabad. One important train that stops over Kamalganj is Kalindi Express. This train establishes a transport link between Kamalganj and capital of India, Delhi.

Kamalganj lies 11 km south of Fatehgarh (a cantonment town in Farrukhabad district) along the road, which connects it to Etah and Kannauj. The town is linked to Etawah and Agra by road through Agra–Lucknow Expressway. With the upcoming Ganga Expressway passing through nearby Hardoi city, the town will soon be connected to Meerut (western Uttar Pradesh) and Prayagraj (eastern Uttar Pradesh) by road.

== Gallery ==
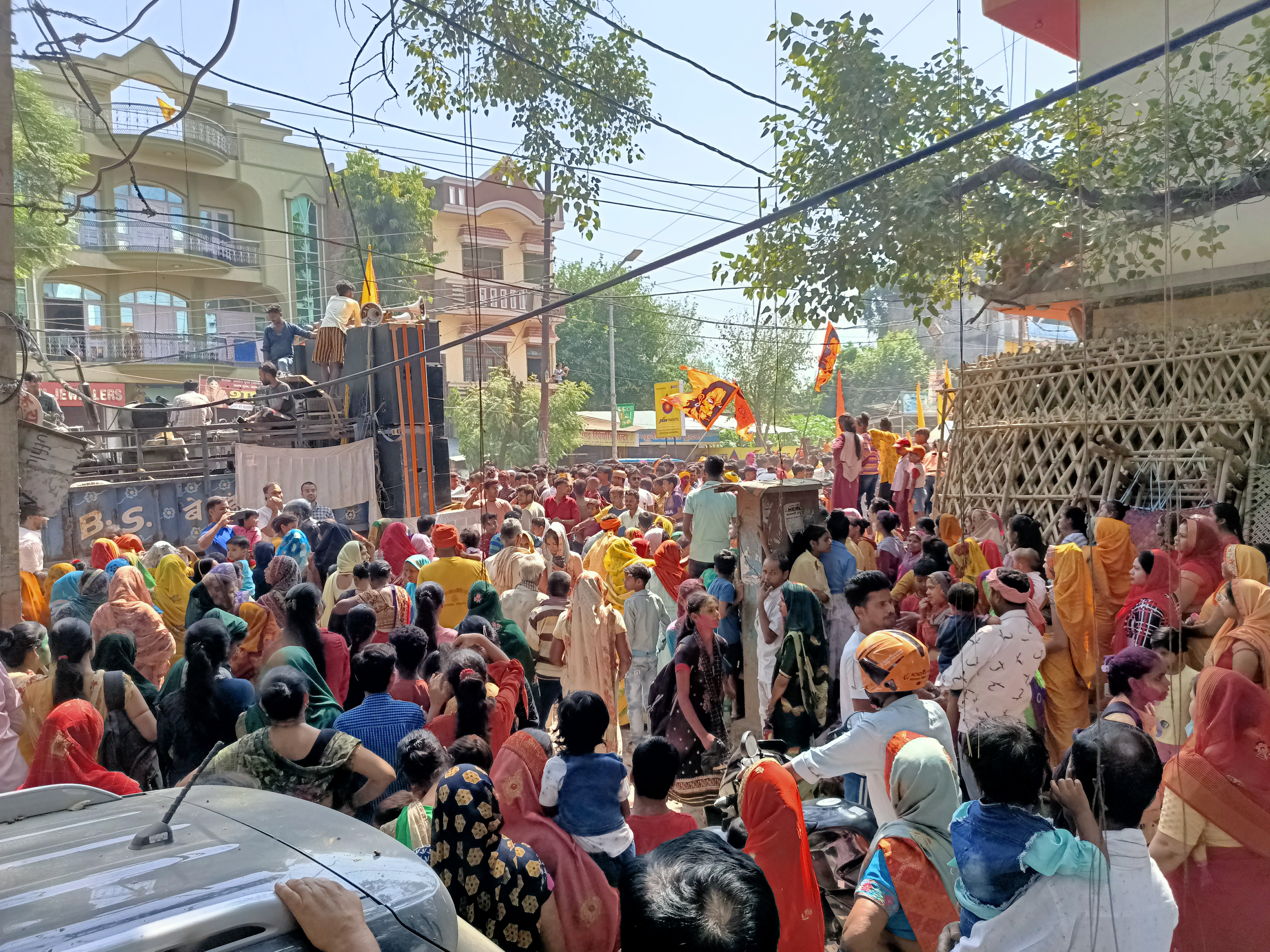
Ganesh Visarjan Mahotsav 2023

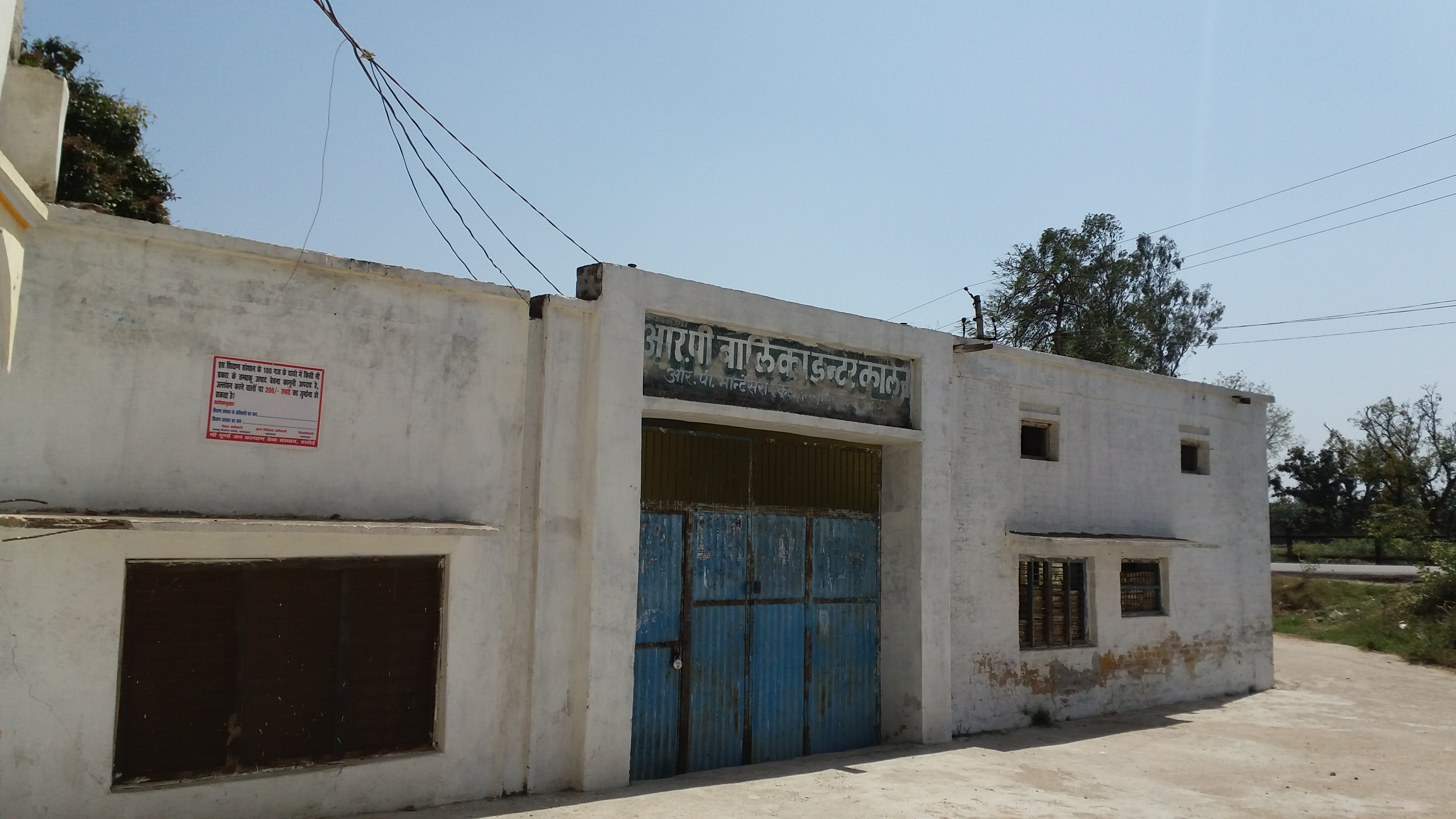
R P Balika Vidyalaya

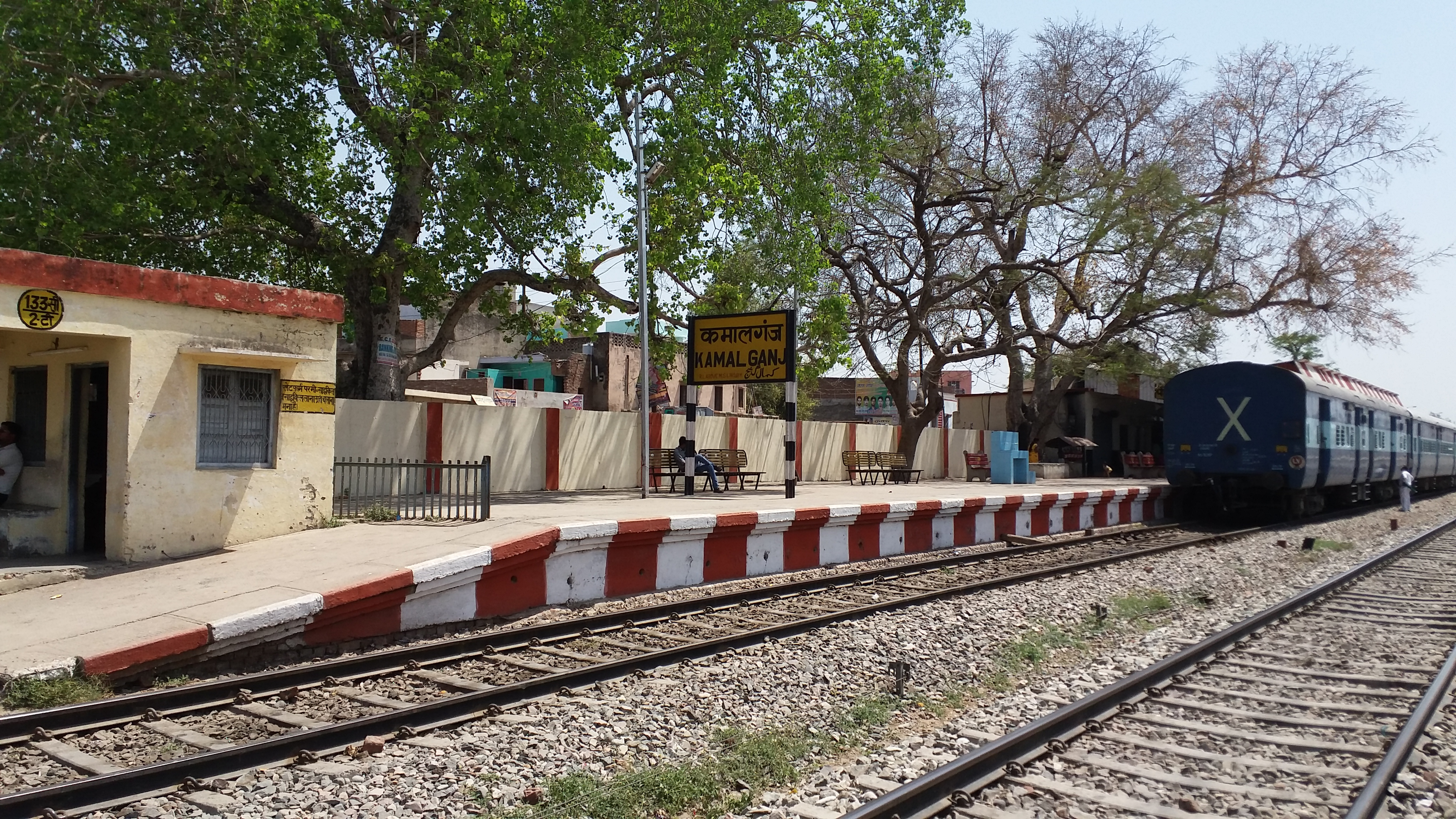
Kamalganj Railway Station (Right End)

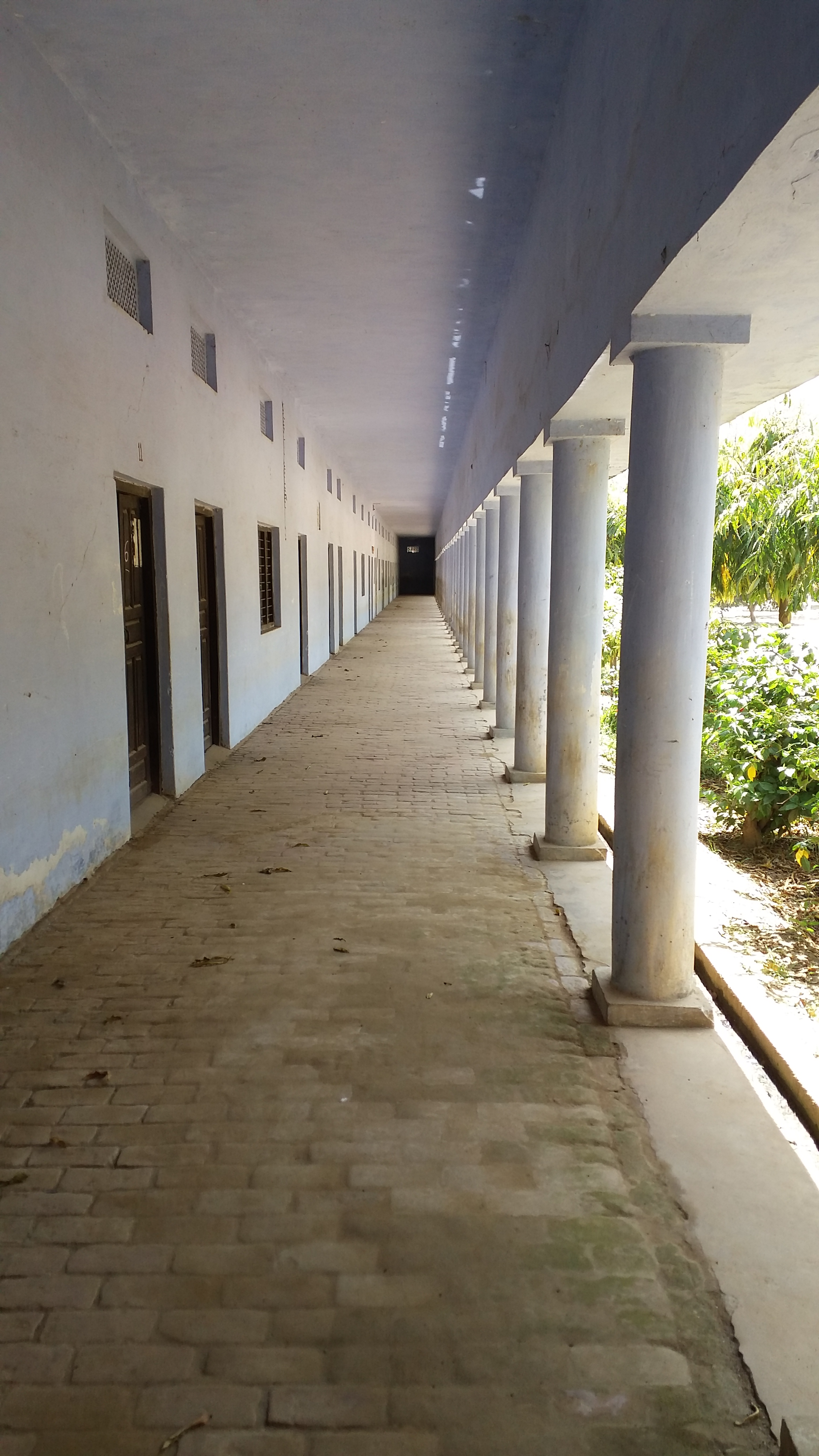
R P Inter College

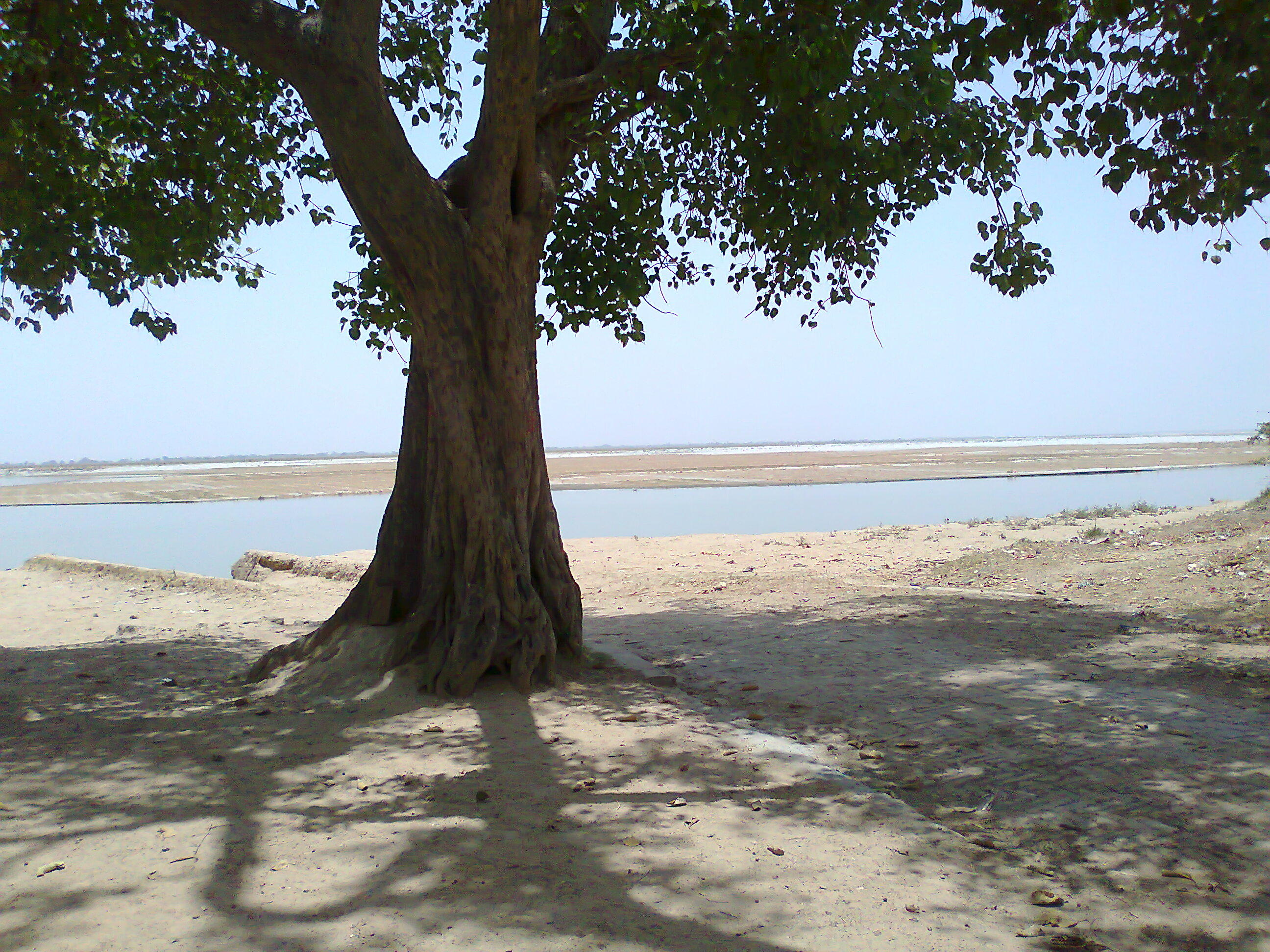
River Ganges at Bhojpur

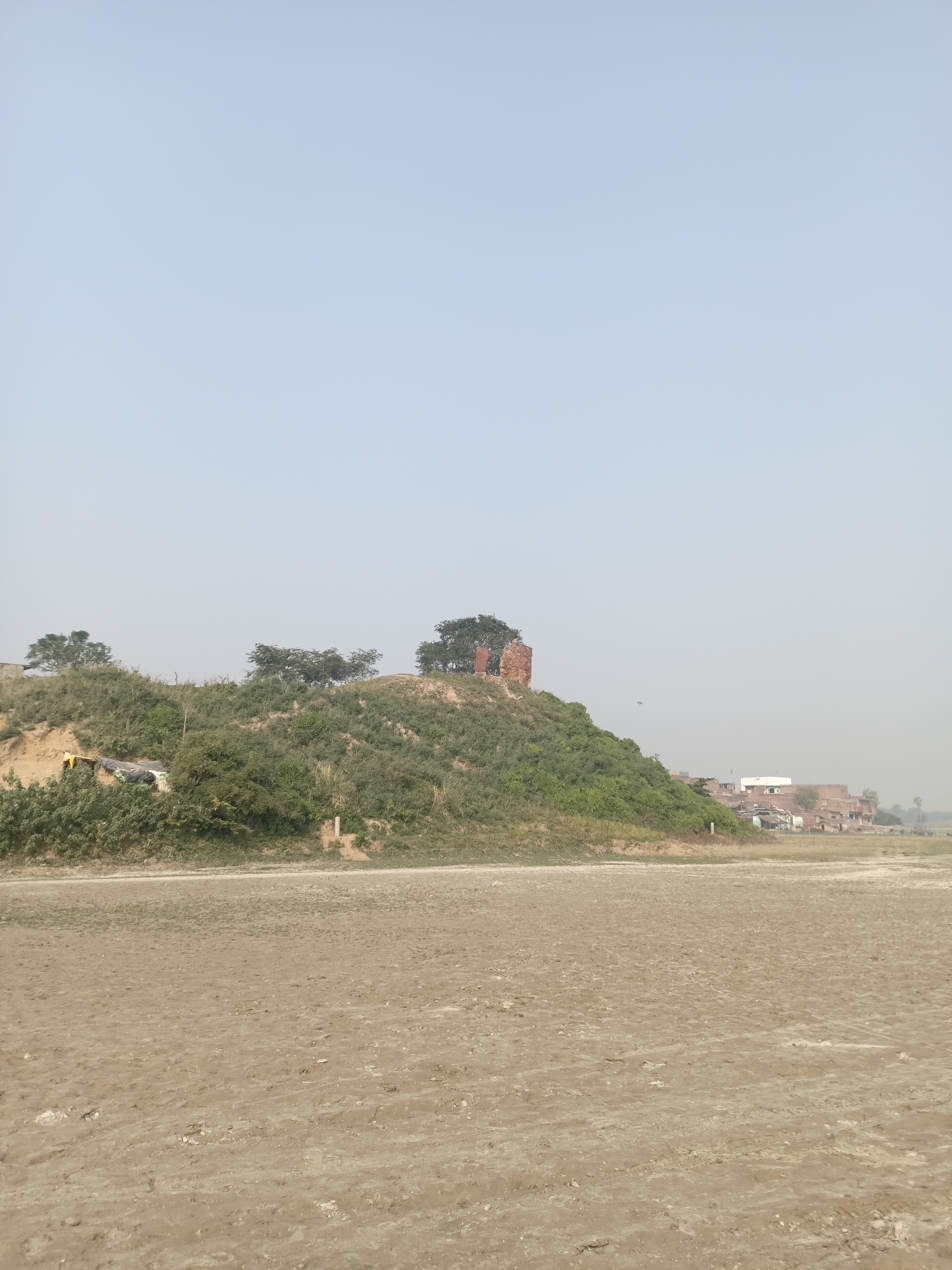
Ruins of Bhojpur Fort near Kamalganj

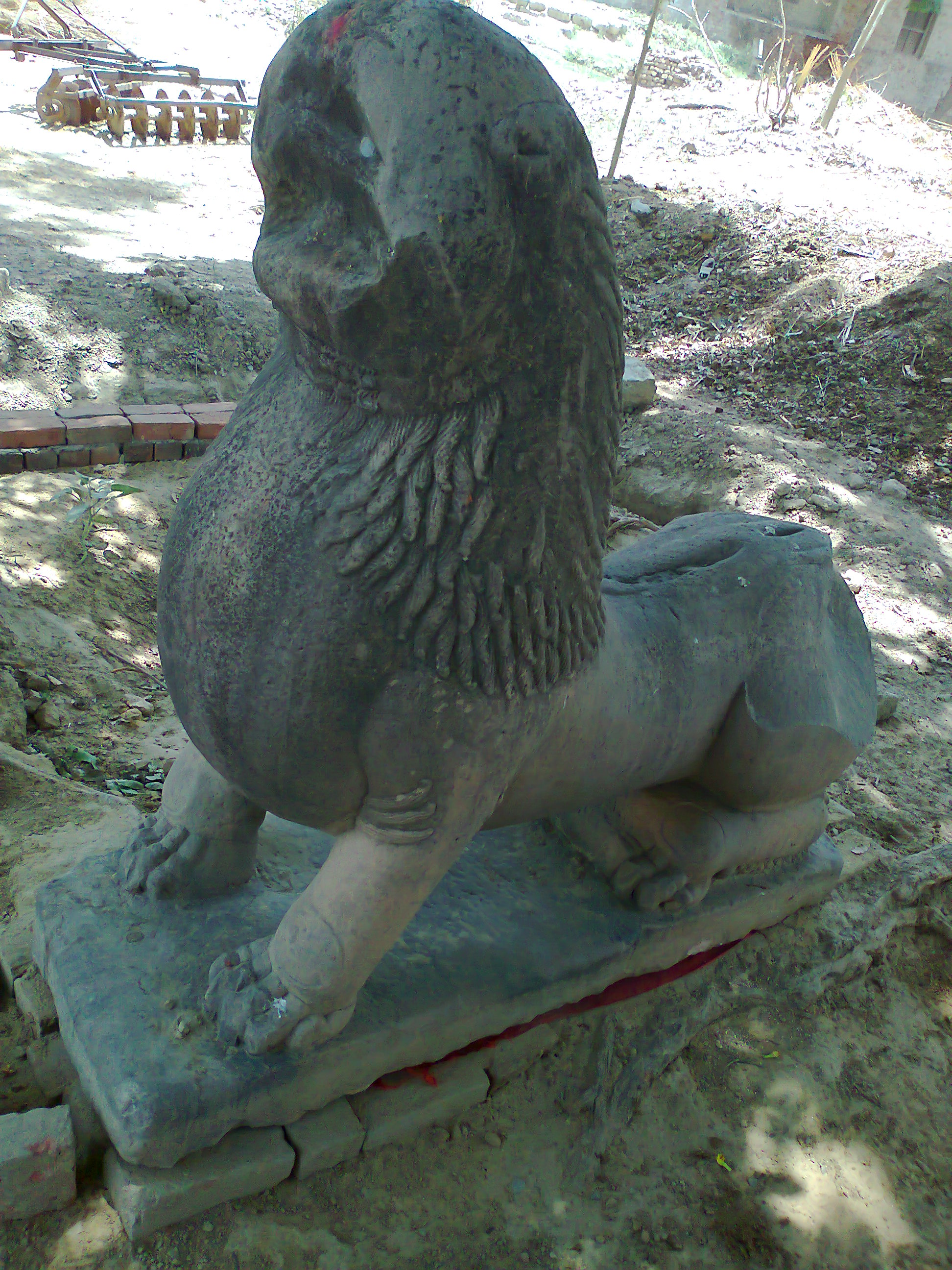
An ancient lion statue recovered from Bhojpur

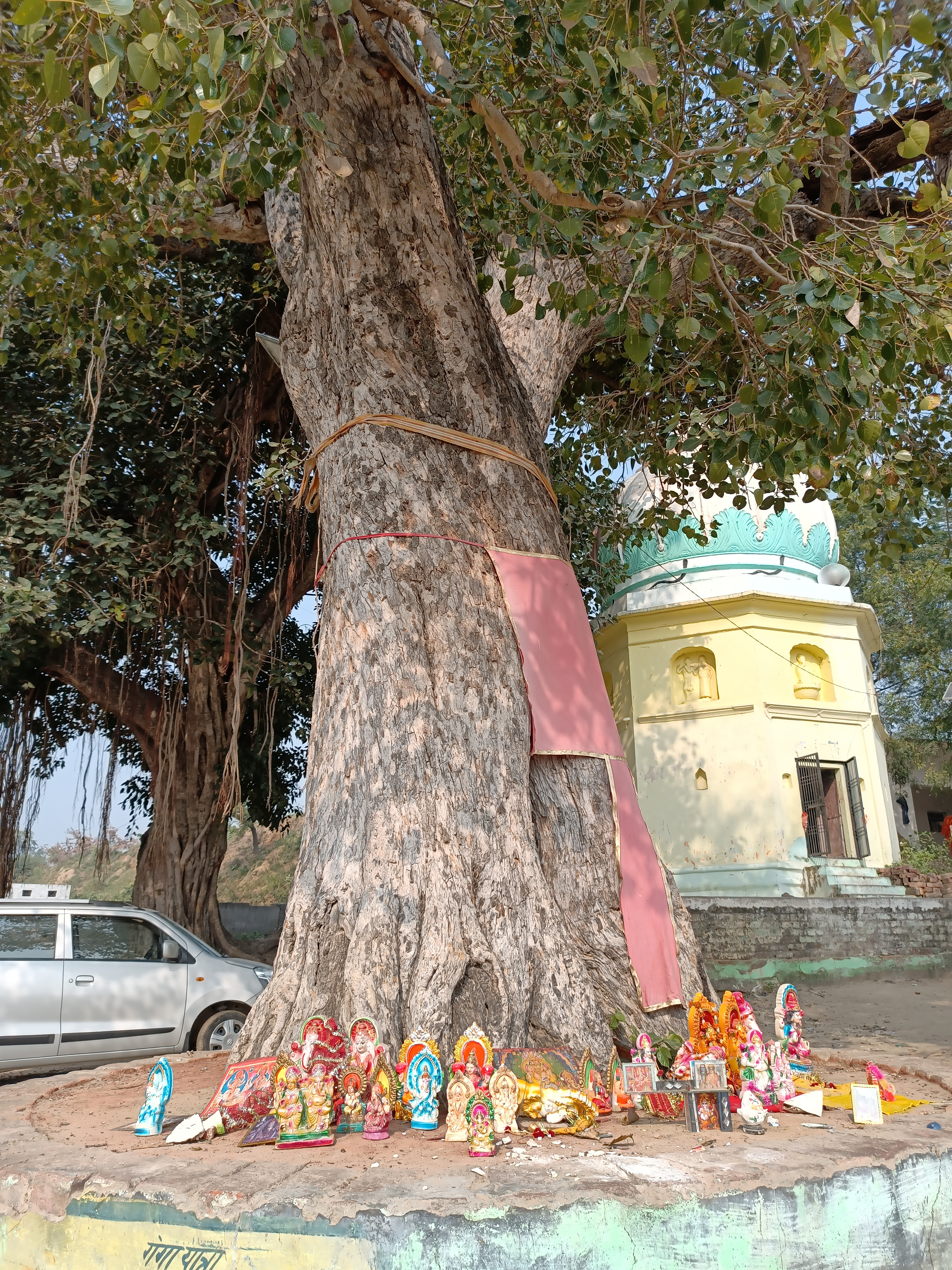
A medieval temple at Ganga Ghat, Bhojpur
