= List of earthquakes in Haryana =

Haryana is one of the 28 states in India, located in the northern part of the country. It is 128 km (approx. 80 miles) from Delhi, the capital of India. The Indian subcontinent has a history of earthquakes. The reason for the intensity and high frequency of shocks caused is due to the Indian plate driving into Asia at a rate of approximately 47 millimetres per year. In 1956, there was a significant earthquake. On May 29, 2020, Atyal of Rohtak was the epicenter of an earthquake.

== Earthquakes ==
Date	Time	Epicenter	Richter Scale	Source
28 May 2020	04:24 pm	Faridabad	2.5	
29 May 2020	09:08 pm	Atyal, Rohtak	4.6	
7 June 2020	10:00 pm	Faridabad	2.1	

== See also ==
- Earthquake zones of India
- Geology of India
- List of aftershocks of April 2015 Nepal earthquake
- Lists of 21st-century earthquakes
