= Mathura–Bhiwani Passenger =

Train in India

Mathura - Bhiwani Passenger
Overview
- Service type: Passenger
- Current operator: North Western Railway

Route
- Termini: Bhiwani Junction (BNW); Mathura Junction (MTJ)
- Stops: 22
- Distance travelled: 281 km (175 mi)
- Average journey time: 7h 30m
- Service frequency: Daily (Note: Runs seven days in a week for every direction.)
- Train number: 54791/54792

On-board services
- Class: Unreserved
- Seating arrangements: Yes
- Sleeping arrangements: No
- Catering facilities: No
- Entertainment facilities: No
- Baggage facilities: No

Technical
- Rolling stock: 2
- Track gauge: 5 ft 6 in (1,676 mm)
- Operating speed: 37 km/h (23 mph) average with halts

The Mathura - Bhiwani Passenger is a passenger train belonging to North Western Railway zone, which runs between Bhiwani Junction and Mathura Junction. It is currently being operated with 54791/54792 train numbers on a daily basis.

== Average speed and frequency ==
The 54791/Mathura - Bhiwani Passenger runs with an average speed of 37 km/h and completes 281 km in 7h 30m. The 54792/Bhiwani - Mathura Passenger runs with an average speed of 35 km/h and completes 281 km in 8h 5m.

== Route and halts ==
The important halts of the train are:

- Mathura Junction
- Bhuteshwar
- Alwar Junction
- Rewari Junction
- Kishangarh Balawas
- Sudharana
- Jharili
- Charkhi Dadri
- Manheru
- Bhiwani Junction

== Coach composite ==
The train has standard ICF rakes with max speed of 110 kmph. The train consists of 12 coaches:

- 10 General Unreserved
- 2 Seating cum Luggage Rake

== Traction ==
Both trains are hauled by a Shakur Basti Loco Shed based WDM-2 diesel locomotive from Bhiwani to Mathura and vice versa.

== Rake Sharing ==
The train shares its rake with 54793/54794 Sawai Madhopur - Mathura Passenger.

== Direction Reversal ==
Train Reverses its direction 1 times:

- Alwar Junction

== See also ==
- Bhiwani Junction railway station
- Mathura Junction railway station
- Sawai Madhopur - Mathura Passenger
