= KLNK =

KLNK may refer to:

- Kalanaur Kalan railway station, Haryana, India (station code KLNK)
- Lincoln Airport (Nebraska) (ICAO code KLNK)
- KLNK-LD, a defunct low-power television station (channel 2, virtual 48) licensed to serve Groveton, Texas, United States
