= Purushottam Express =

Train in India

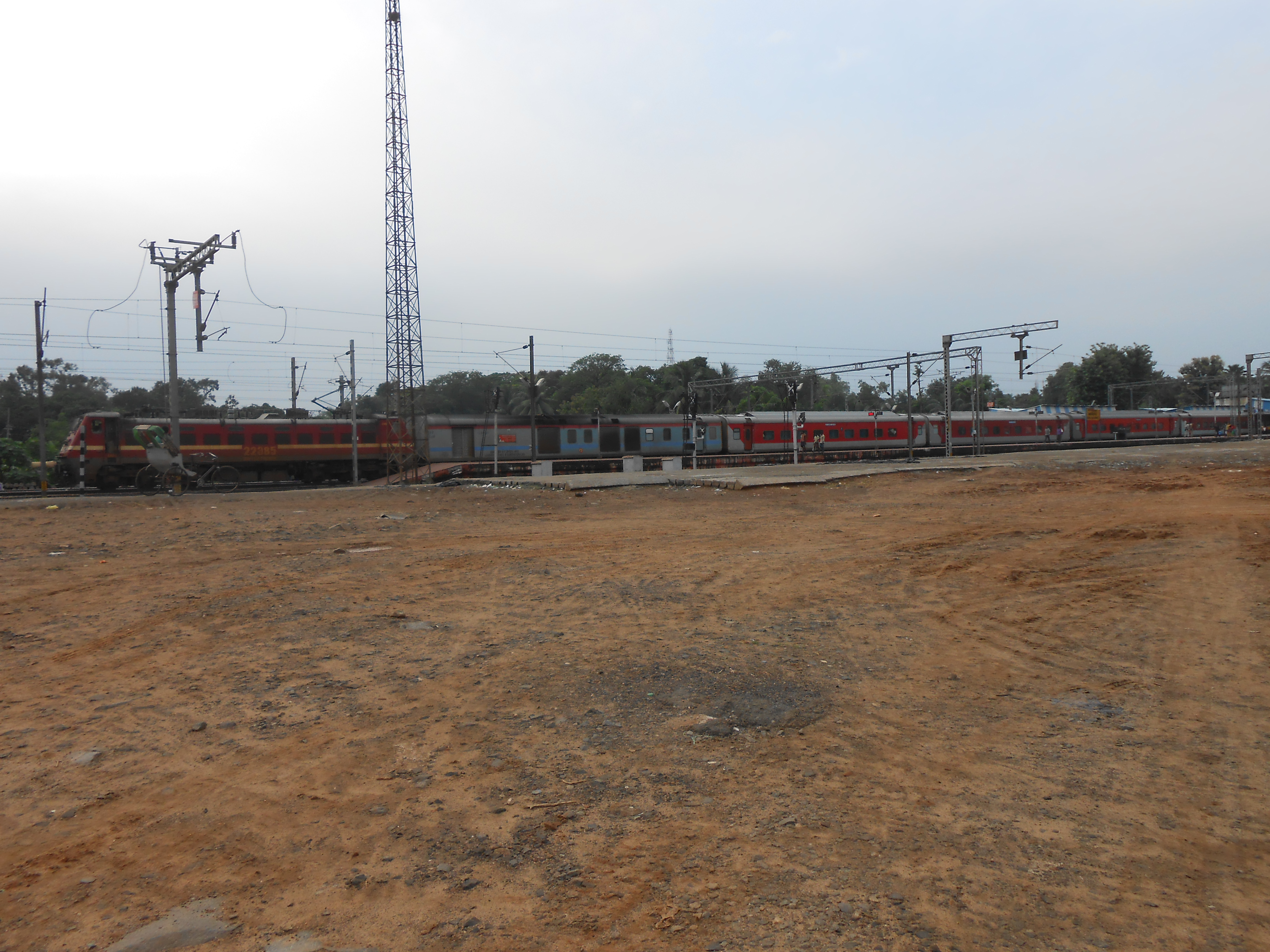

Overview
- Service type: Superfast
- Locale: Odisha, West Bengal, Jharkhand, Bihar, Uttar Pradesh & Delhi
- First service: 2 July 1993; 33 years ago
- Current operator: East Coast Railway

Route
- Termini: Puri (PURI); New Delhi (NDLS)
- Stops: 30
- Distance travelled: 1,861 km (1,156 mi)
- Average journey time: 30 Hrs 45 Mins
- Service frequency: Daily
- Train number: 12801 / 12802

On-board services
- Classes: AC First Class, AC 2 Tier, AC 3 Tier, Sleeper Class, General Unreserved
- Seating arrangements: Yes
- Sleeping arrangements: Yes
- Catering facilities: Available
- Observation facilities: Large windows
- Baggage facilities: Available
- Other facilities: Below the seats

Technical
- Rolling stock: LHB coach
- Track gauge: 1,676 mm (5 ft 6 in)
- Operating speed: 61 km/h (38 mph) average including halts.

The 12801 / 12802 Purushottam Express is a superfast express train operated by Indian Railways that runs between Puri in Odisha and New Delhi in Delhi. It is one of the major train services connecting Puri and Delhi. The train passes through the states of Odisha, West Bengal, Jharkhand, Bihar, and Uttar Pradesh. It was the first train in India to feature a Braille-embedded coach for visually impaired passengers. Among railfans, it is sometimes referred to as the "Queen of East Coast Railway".

On 2 November 2021, one AC First Class coach was added to the Purushottam Express. Following this addition, it became the first Delhi–Odisha superfast train to have a dedicated AC First Class coach.

== Timetable ==
From Puri to New Delhi- 12801. The train starts from Puri every day

Station code	Station name	Arrival	Departure
PURI	Puri Terminus	--	21:55
KUR	Khurda Road Jn	22:35	22:40
BBS	Bhubaneswar	23:00	23:05
CTC	Cuttack	23:35	23:40
JJKR	Jajpur Keonjhar Road	00:31	00:33
BLS	Balasore	02:05	02:10
HIJ	Hijli	03:45	03:55
TATA	Tatanagar	06:22	06:32
BKSC	Bokaro Steel City	09:45	09:50
GMO	NSC Bose Gomoh Jn	10:50	10:55
PNME	Parasnath	11:08	11:10
KQR	Koderma Jn	12:00	12:02
GAYA	Gaya Jn	13:43	13:48
AUBR	Anugraha Narayan Road	14:26	14:28
DOS	Dehri On Sone	14:41	14:43
SSM	Sasaram	14:56	14:58
BBU	Bhabua Road	15:28	15:30
DDU	Pt DD Upadhyaya Jn	16:50	17:00
CAR	Chunar Jn	17:38	17:40
MZP	Mirzapur	18:03	18:05
ALD	Prayagraj Jn	19:20	19:30
FTP	Fatehpur	20:38	20:40
CNB	Kanpur Central	21:55	22:00
GZB	Ghaziabad	03:18	03:20
NDLS	New Delhi	04:00	--

From New Delhi to Puri – 12802. The train starts from New Delhi every day.

Station code	Station name	Arrival	Departure
NDLS	New Delhi	--	22:40
CNB	Kanpur Central	04:00	04:05
FTP	Fatehpur	05:00	05:02
ALD	Prayagraj Jn	06:55	07:00
MZP	Mirzapur	08:10	08:12
CAR	Chunar Jn	08:35	08:37
DDU	Pt DD Upadhyaya Jn	09:50	10:00
BBU	Bhabua Road Jn	10:35	10:37
SSM	Sasaram	11:05	11:07
DOS	Dehri On Sone	11:21	11:23
AUBR	Anugraha Narayan Road	11:38	11:40
GAYA	Gaya Jn	12:35	12:40
KQR	Koderma Jn	13:58	14:00
HZD	Hazaribagh Road	13:28	14:30
PNME	Parasnath	14:48	14:50
GMO	NSC Bose Gomoh Jn	15:25	15:30
CRP	Chandrapura	15:48	15:50
BKSC	Bokaro Steel City Jn	16:30	16:35
TATA	Tatanagar Jn	19:58	20:08
HIJ	Hijli	22:45	22:55
BLS	Balasore	00:15	00:20
JJKR	Jajpur Keonjhar Road	01:53	01:55
CTC	Cuttack Jn	02:50	02:55
BBS	Bhubaneswar	03:30	03:35
KUR	Khurda Road Jn	03:55	04:00
PURI	Puri Terminus	05:25	--

== Coaches ==
The train consists of 22 LHB coach which includes :-

- Six Sleeper class Coaches
- Five AC 3 Tier & 1 AC three tier economy
- Two AC 2 Tier
- One 1st AC Coach
- Four General class Coaches
- One EOG & One Divyang-Jan Coach
- One Pantry Car.

Loco	1	2	3	4	5	6	7	8	9	10	11	12	13	14	15	16	17	18	19	20
	EOG	GEN	H1	B6	B5	B4	B3	B2	B1	A1	PC	S7	S6	S5	S4	S3	S2	S1	GEN	SLRD

== Traction ==
Earlier, the train was hauled by a WDM-2 diesel locomotive. It is currently hauled by a WAP-7 or WAP-4 electric locomotive based at Tughlakabad Loco Shed or Ghaziabad Loco Shed for its entire journey.

== Accident ==
20 August – The Purushottam Express collided with the stationary Kalindi Express near Firozabad railway station at about 3:00 a.m. in the Firozabad rail disaster, killing 358 people. The Kalindi Express had struck a nilgai and was unable to proceed because its brakes were damaged. As the signal for the Purushottam Express remained green, it collided with the Kalindi Express from behind. Three coaches of the Kalindi Express were destroyed, while the locomotive and first two coaches of the Purushottam Express derailed. Most of the approximately 2,200 passengers aboard the two trains were asleep at the time of the collision.

- 15 April – Four people were killed when the Purushottam Express struck passengers from the Sainagar Shirdi–Kalka Express who were on the tracks observing an earlier incident.

== See also ==
- New Delhi railway station
- Puri railway station
- Bhubaneswar Rajdhani Express
- Prayagraj Express
- Nandan Kanan Express
- Neelachal Express
