= Kamalganj railway station =

Railway station in Uttar Pradesh, India

Coordinates: 27.2586°N 79.6303°E

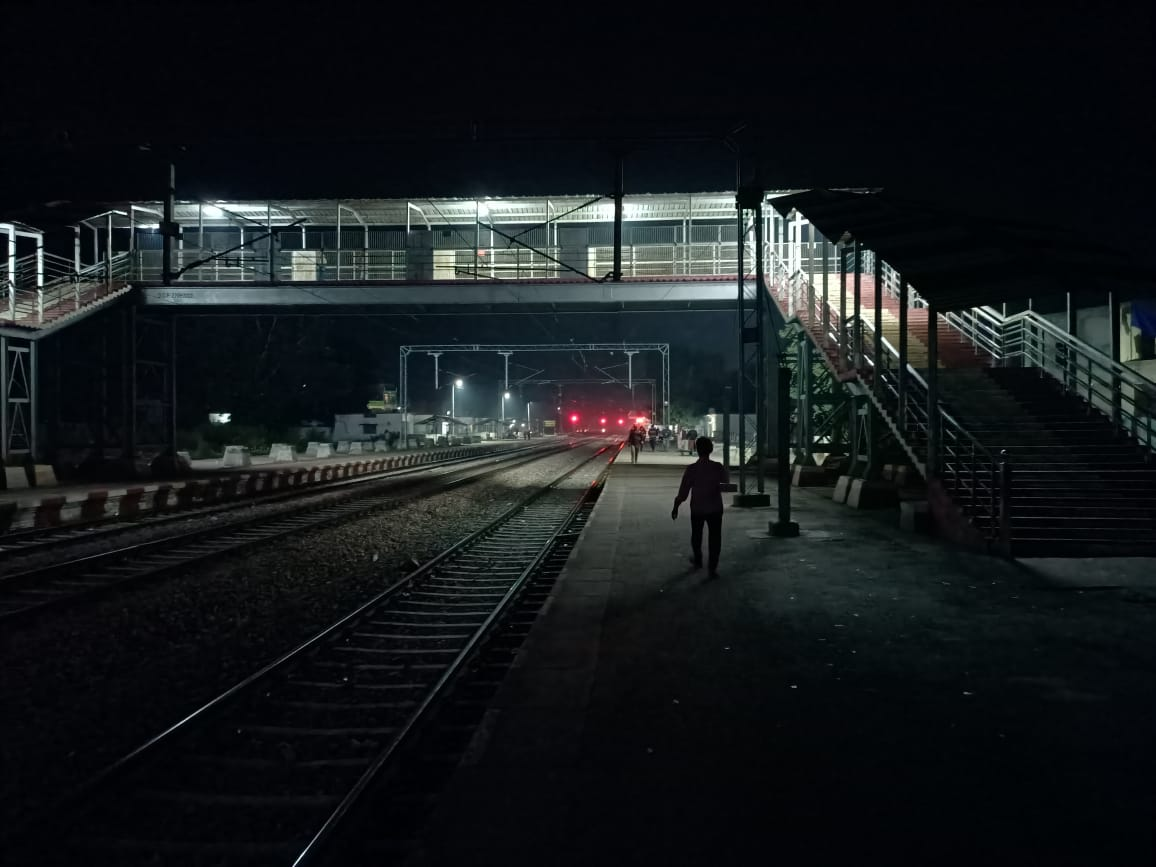

General information
- Location: Kamalganj, Farukhabad, Uttar Pradesh; India
- System: Indian Railway Station
- Owner: Indian Railways
- Operator: North Eastern Railway
- Platforms: 2
- Tracks: 3

Construction
- Structure type: Standard

Other information
- Station code: KLJ
Location

Kamalganj railway station is located in Farukhabad district, Uttar Pradesh state, India. It serves the town of Kamalganj. Its code is KLJ. It has two platforms. The station is located between Yaqutganj and Singhirampur railway stations, with them being 4 km away from both sides.

A broad gauge line connects Kamalganj to Kanpur and Prayagraj via Kannauj and to Kasganj via Farrukhabad. The most important train that stops at the station is Kalindi Express. The train establishes a transport link between Kamalganj and Delhi.
