= Atail =

- Village (Rohtak)
- Atail
- Location in Haryana, India Atail (India)
- Coordinates: 28.82°N 76.74°E
- Country: India
- State: Haryana

Government
  - Type: Panchayat
  - Body: Haryana Legislative Assembly

Population (2011)
  - Total: 4,500

Languages
  - Official: Hindi Haryanvi
- Time zone: UTC+5:30 (IST)
- PinCode: 124501
- Vehicle registration: HR95
- Website: haryana.gov.in

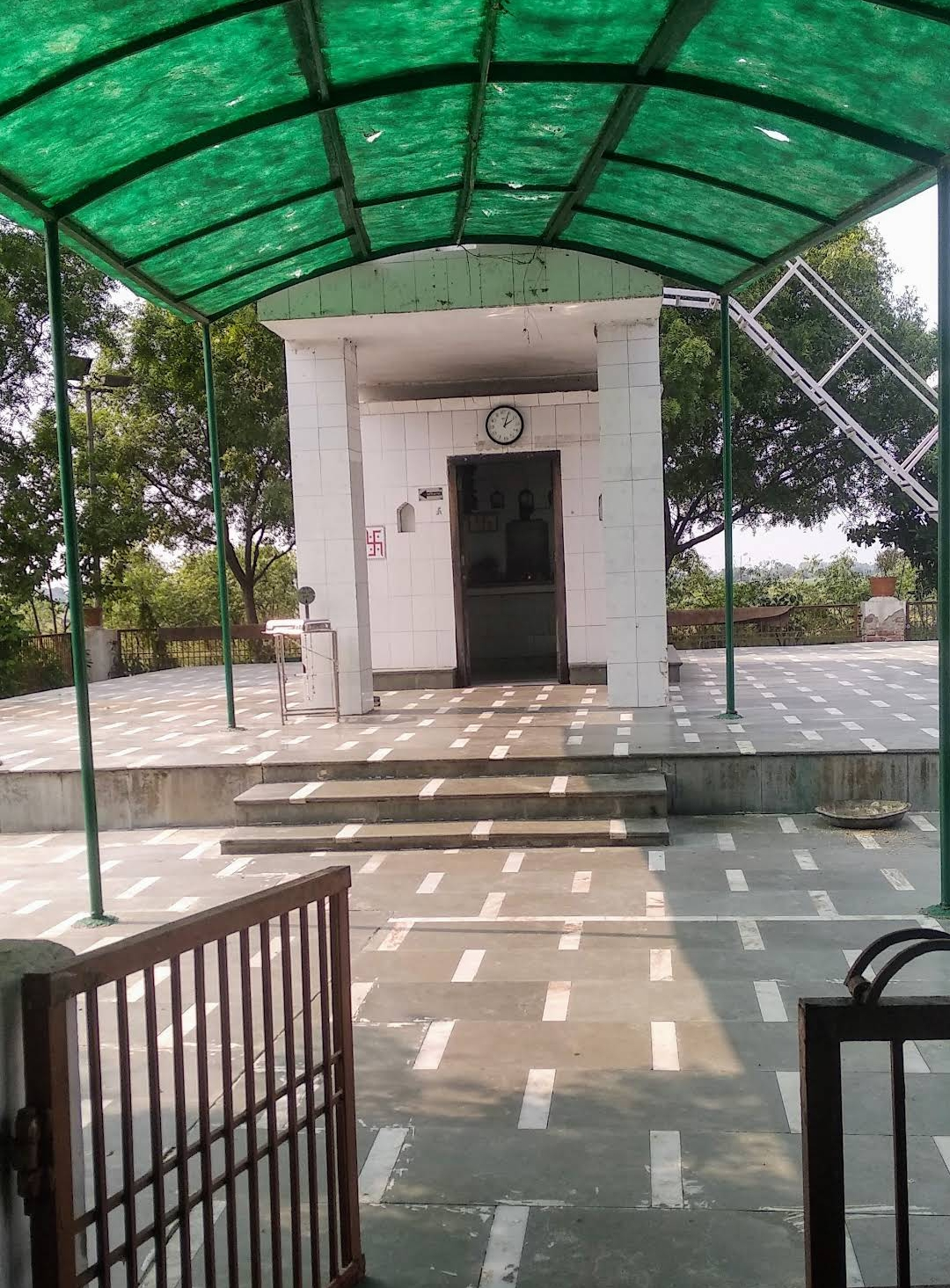
The Dada Deipal temple.

Atail is a village in the Rohtak district of Haryana, India. Atail is 15 kilometers from the city of Rohtak and, as it is 68 kilometers from New Delhi, is included in the National Capital Region (India). Village comes under Sampla Tehsil And RTO Sampla Division HR95 is vehicle registration code for village vehicles. The village's population 4,500, with 4,100 voters. The Indian Constitution and the Panchyati Raaj Act say that the Sarpanch (Head of Village), who is chosen by the people of Atail village, is in charge of running the village.

Delhi Metro Rail Corporation station Bahadurgarh City metro station is nearest metro station to the village. Western Peripheral Expressway is also 24 kilometers from the village. Atail also hosts a Haryana Roadways Bus Stop connecting it with Rohtak-Sampla and other villages. The nearest train station is Sampla railway station which is nearly 8 km away.

The administration of Atail is based on the panchayat system. A sarpanch is elected every five years. Atail is included in the Garhi Sampla-Kiloi Assembly constituency of Haryana Legislative Assembly and the Rohtak Lok Sabha constituency of the Parliament of India.

Two government schools one for only girls and one co-ed is there in the village. And two private schools Charan Singh and New Global School Atail are also functioning in the village.

Malik is main gotra of Jats in the village.

Gandhra, Kisranti, Pakasma, Gijhi, and Dattaur are the nearest villages.
