= Firozabad rail collision =

1995 train crash in Uttar Pradesh, India

Coordinates: 27°08′46″N 78°23′25″E

Details
- Date: 20 August 1995; 31 years ago 02:55
- Location: Firozabad, Uttar Pradesh
- Country: India
- Line: Delhi–Kanpur
- Operator: Indian Railways
- Service: Kalindi Express, Purushottam Express
- Incident type: Rear-end collision
- Cause: Obstruction on line (nilgai)

Statistics
- Trains: 2 (Kalindi Express and Purushottam Express)
- Vehicles: WDM-2 locomotives
- Passengers: 2,200
- Deaths: 358 (official); 400 (estimated); >800 (unofficial)

The Firozabad rail collision occurred on 20 August 1995 near Firozabad on the Delhi–Kanpur section of India's Northern Railway, at 02:55 when a passenger train collided with a train that had stopped after hitting a nilgai, killing 358 people. Some estimate the death toll at more than 400. The crash happened in the Indian state of Uttar Pradesh. Both trains were bound for the Indian capital, New Delhi.

The first train, the Kalindi Express from Kanpur, struck a nilgai and could not proceed due to damaged brakes. It was then struck from behind at a speed of 70 kilometres per hour (43 mph) by the Purushottam Express from Puri. Three carriages of the Kalindi Express were destroyed, and the engine and front two carriages of the Puri train were derailed. Most of the 2,200 passengers aboard the two trains were asleep at the time of the collision.

The accident remains the deadliest rail accident in Indian history.

== See also ==
- List of railway accidents and incidents in India
- List of train accidents by death toll

== Sources ==
- Train crash kills at least 800 in India, report from CNN.
- Trains collide and explode in India
