= Sawai Madhopur–Mathura Passenger =

Train in India

Overview
- Service type: Passenger
- Current operator: North Western Railway

Route
- Termini: Sawai Madhopur Junction (SWM); Mathura Junction (MTJ)
- Stops: 22
- Distance travelled: 216 km (134 mi)
- Average journey time: 6h 10m
- Service frequency: Daily (Note: Runs seven days in a week for every direction.)
- Train number: 54793/54794

On-board services
- Class: Unreserved
- Seating arrangements: Yes
- Sleeping arrangements: No
- Catering facilities: No
- Entertainment facilities: No
- Baggage facilities: No

Technical
- Rolling stock: 2
- Track gauge: 5 ft 6 in (1,676 mm)
- Operating speed: 35 km/h (22 mph) average with halts

Sawai Madhopur–Mathura Passenger is a passenger train belonging to North Western Railway zone, which runs between Sawai Madhopur Junction and Mathura Junction. It is currently being operated with 54793/54794 train numbers on a daily basis.

== Average speed and frequency ==
The 54793/Sawai Madhopur - Mathura Passenger runs with an average speed of 35 km/h and completes 216 km in 6h 10m. The 54794/Mathura - Sawai Madhopur Passenger runs with an average speed of 38 km/h and completes 216 km in 5h 45m.

== Route and halts ==
The important halts of the train are:

- Sawai Madhopur Junction
- Ranthambhore
- Mokholi
- Malarna
- Gangapur City
- Hindaun City
- Dumariya
- Bayana Junction
- Kela Devi
- Bharatpur Junction
- Mathura Junction

== Coach composite ==
The train has standard ICF rakes with max speed of 110 kmph. The train consists of 12 coaches:

- 10 General Unreserved
- 2 Seating cum Luggage Rake

== Traction ==
Both trains are hauled by a Shakur Basti Loco Shed based WDM-2 diesel locomotive from Sawai Madhopur to Mathura and vice versa.

== Rake Sharing ==
The train shares its rake with 54791/54792 Mathura - Bhiwani Passenger.

== See also ==
- Sawai Madhopur railway station
- Mathura Junction railway station
- Mathura - Bhiwani Passenger
