= Bhiwani City railway station =

Railway station in India

Bhiwani City Railway Station

General information
- Location: Station Road, Bhiwani, Haryana; India
- Coordinates: 28.8253°N 76.1440°E
- Elevation: 216 metres (709 ft)
- System: Indian Railways station
- Owner: Indian Railways
- Operator: North Western Railway
- Line: Bhiwani–Rohtak link
- Platforms: 04
- Tracks: 5 ft 6 in (1,676 mm) broad gauge

Construction
- Structure type: Standard on ground
- Parking: Yes
- Cycle facilities: No
- Accessible: Yes

Other information
- Status: Functioning
- Station code: BNWC
- Division(s): Bikaner

History
- Opened: 1884; 142 years ago

Services
Preceding station	Indian Railways	Following station
Bhiwani Junction towards ?	North Western Railway zone Bhiwani–Rohtak link	Bamla towards ?
Location

Bhiwani City Railway Station is located in Bhiwani district in the Indian state of Haryana. Its code is BNWC. It serves Bhiwani city. This station is currently under development as the Indian railway is increasing the number of platforms and many other facilities.

== Major trains ==
Some of the important trains that run from Bhiwani City are:

- Bhiwani Delhi Passenger (unreserved)
- Bhiwani Rohtak Passenger (unreserved)
- Abhilash Komal Express
- Abhilash Mansi Passenger (unreserved)
- Abhilash Chanchal Express (reserved)
- Abhilash Medha express

(Resserved)

- Kalindi express
