= Kharak railway station =

Railway station in Haryana, India

Kharak Railway Station

General information
- Location: Kharak railway station India
- Coordinates: 28.8581714°N 76.6268394°E
- Elevation: 222 metres (728 ft)
- System: Indian Railway Station
- Owner: Indian Railways
- Operator: North Western Railway
- Line: Delhi–Rohtak line

Construction
- Structure type: Standard on ground

Other information
- Status: Functioning
Location
- Location within Haryana

Kharak Railway Station is a station on the Bhiwani–Rohtak line. It is located in the Indian state of Haryana. It serves Kharak and surrounding area.

== See also ==
- List of railway stations in Haryana

| Preceding station | Indian Railways | Following station |
