= Bhiwani Junction railway station =

Rail station in Haryana, India

Bhiwani Junction City
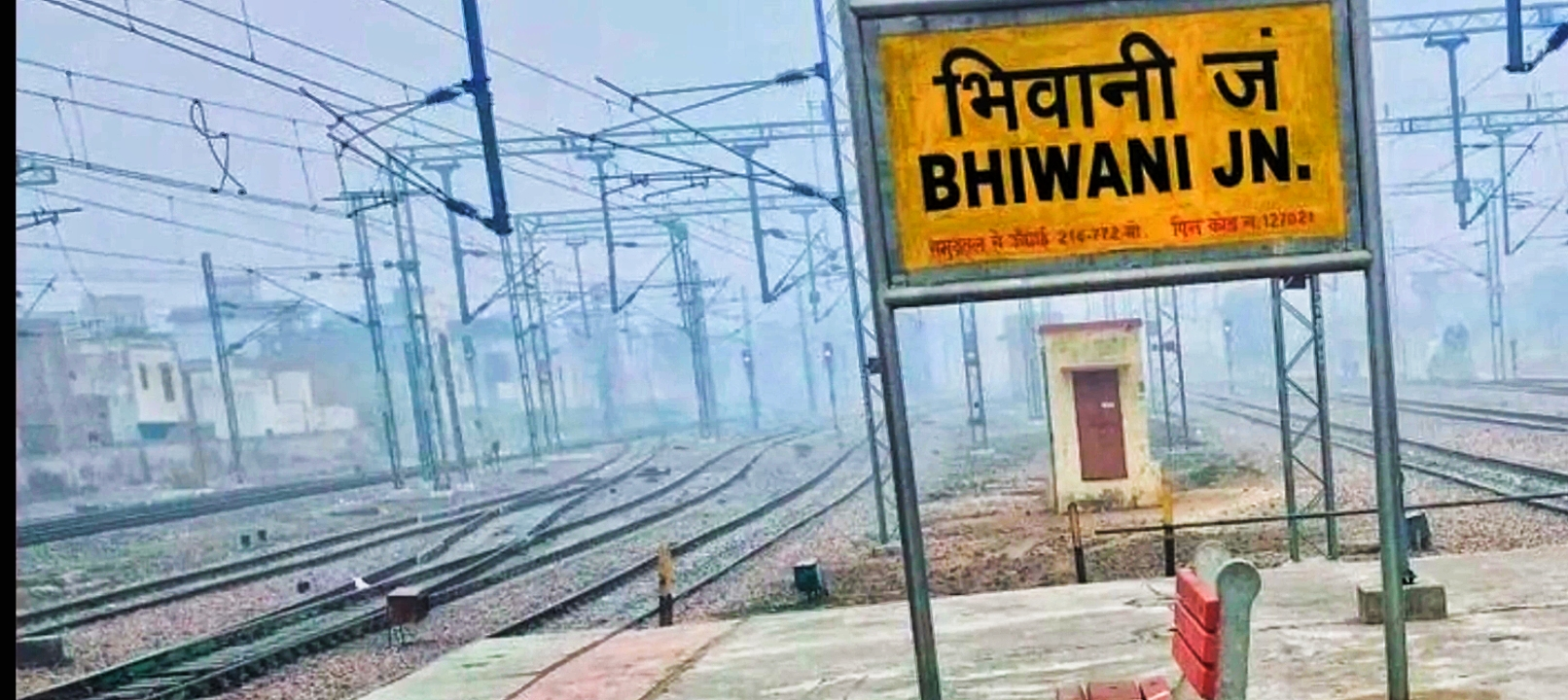
- Bhiwani Junction Railway Station

General information
- Location: Station Road, Bhiwani, Haryana; India
- Coordinates: 28°47′52″N 76°07′30″E
- Elevation: 216 metres (709 ft)
- System: Express train, Passenger train and Commuter rail
- Owner: Indian Railways
- Operator: North Western Railway zone
- Lines: Bathinda–Rewari line Bhiwani–Rohtak link
- Platforms: 3
- Tracks: 1,676 mm (5 ft 6 in)

Construction
- Structure type: Standard on ground
- Parking: Yes
- Cycle facilities: No
- Accessible: Yes

Other information
- Status: Functioning
- Station code: BNW
- Division(s): Bikaner

History
- Opened: 1884; 142 years ago
Location
- Location within Haryana

Bhiwani Railway Station is located in Bhiwani district in the Indian state of Haryana. It serves Bhiwani.

== History ==
The Rajputana–Malwa Railway extended the 1,000 mm (3 ft 3 3/8 in) wide metre gauge Delhi–Rewari line to Bathinda in 1884. The Bathinda–Rewari metre-gauge line was converted to 5 ft 6 in (1,676 mm) broad gauge in 1994.

The Bhiwani–Rohtak link was laid in 1979.

== Infrastructure ==
Bhiwani railway station is at an elevation of 216 metres (709 ft) and was assigned the code – BNW. Now Bhiwani–Rewari line has expected to be double in 2016.

== Amenities ==
The station has retiring rooms.

Recent developments had been made at this station by govt including parking for cars and two wheeler and more room for passenger to sit

Preceding station	Indian Railways	Following station
Sui towards ?	North Western Railway zone Bathinda–Rewari line	Manheru towards ?
Terminus	North Western Railway zone Bhiwani–Rohtak link	Bhiwani City towards ?
