= List of national flag proposals =

Compilation of all the well documented national flag proposals of several countries, dependent territories, autonomies, and states with limited recognition.

An asterisk in headings denotes an incomplete list, which has more proposals not in Wikimedia Commons yet.

== Algeria ==
In the summer of 1962, a flag was proposed during ceasefire talks between the National Liberation Front (FLN) and the Secret Army Organisation (OAS) representatives in Algiers:

"And then, later on, the flag of the new state will be designed in the manner of the Commonwealth countries, Canada or Australia... the French colours in the upper right corner of the cloth".

The "upper right corner" in question can either refer to a canton or the upper fly. However, as inspiration from Commonwealth flags was taken and some Arabic flags are flown in sinister — the right side is where the flag pole is — it is likely to be a canton displayed in Arabic fashion to Fernand Carréras.

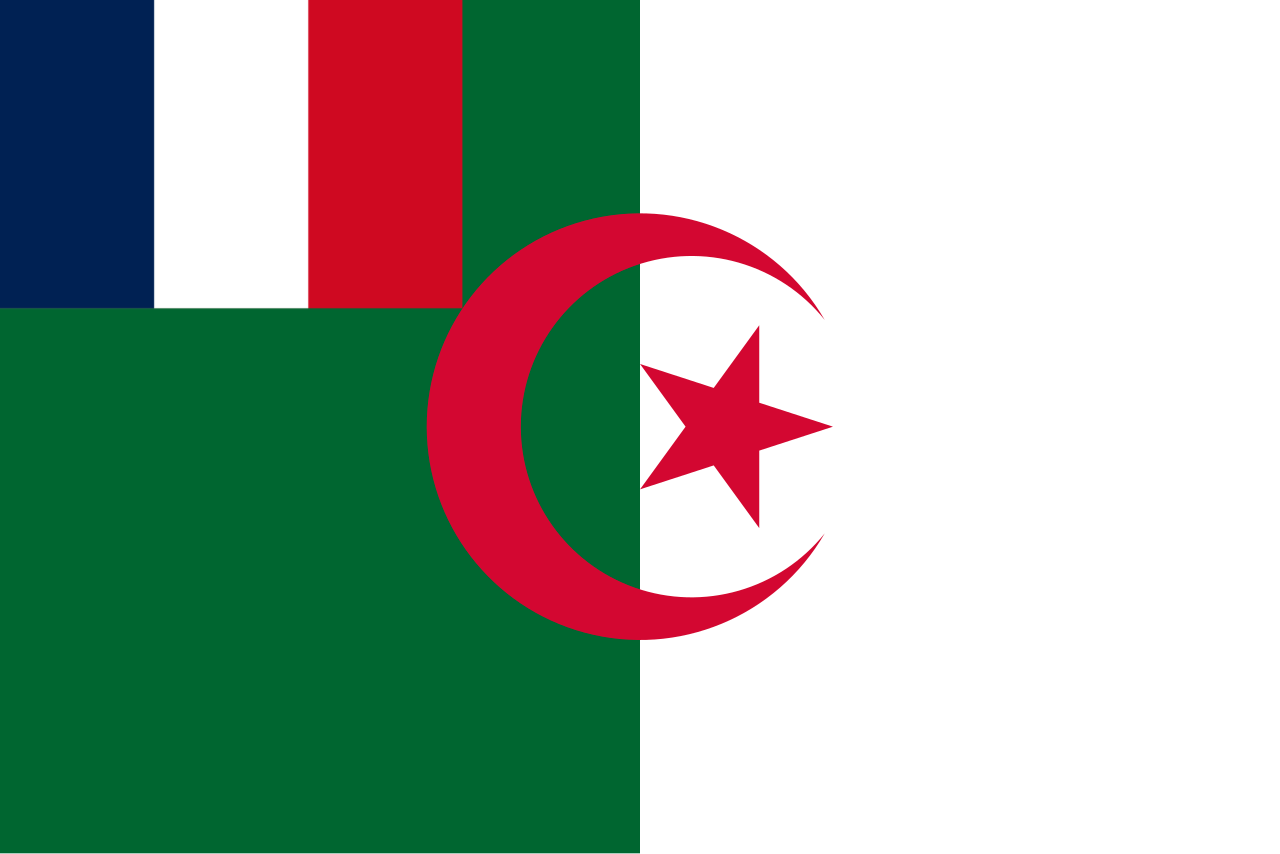
FLN and OAS' Algeria flag proposal interpretation (1962) in current fashion (flown in dexter)

FLN and OAS' Algeria flag proposal interpretation (1962) in Arabic fashion (flown in sinister)

== Angola ==
In June 1932, while working for the Portuguese Institute of Heraldry (IPH), Affonso Dornellas elaborated a coat of arms for the Colony of Angola and João Ricardo da Silva drew it. Even though the Estado Novo's Agência Geral das Colónias (General Agency of the Colonies) had asked for the shield, it was never used officially. Like other designs, the Agency used a modified version at the 1934 Colonial Exposition of Porto, before settling with the 1935 shield design.

In 1966, heraldist Franz Paul de Almeira Langhans designed flags for Portuguese ultramarine provinces in his book "Armorial do Ultramar Português", that of Angola being the Flag of Portugal defaced with the colony's lesser arms shield on its lower fly side.

A red-green-black tricolor was allegedly mentioned by a reporter who visited Angola in the beginning of September of '96 to vexillologist Jaume Ollé as a "proposal under consideration to be the basis of a new national flag", it featured the colors of both the foundational MPLA and its main opposition (UNITA) while using the Pan-African flag colours. At the time, Rhodesian vexillologist Bruce Berry said the Angolan embassy in South Africa did not acknowledge any move to change the flag.

Additionally, in 1999 Ollé wrote about flags seen by him in Luanda pictures from '76: "Horizontal stripes of red, green and black [...] Horizontal B-R-B horizontal (the red stripe fimbriated Y) [...] Stripes of red, purple and green".

In 2003, a submission 106 by "Catica" was chosen by the National Constitutional Commission, an organ in charge of drafting the country's next constitution, as the new flag, its description being the following:

"A rectangular flag measuring 180 centimeters long and 120 centimeters wide, divided in five horizontal stripes: its top and bottom stripes are dark blue, each measuring 20 centimeters, the two intermediate stripes are white, each measuring 10 centimeters, and the central stripe is blood-red, measuring 60 centimeters. The middle red stripe features a design of a 15-ray yellowish sun comprising three irregular concentric circles which are inspired by the ancestral Tchitundo-Hulu rocks paintings in the country's Southwestern Namibe province. The sun symbolizes the riches and the historical and cultural identity of Angola".

The polemic new flag, along with a new anthem, were supposed to be formally adopted after the planned 2005 general elections, which only ended up happening in '08, but this never happened.

UNITA has positioned itself against the current flag for its similarities with MPLA's and keeps on fighting for its change.

IPH's Colony of Angola flag proposal (1932)

Langhans' Overseas Province of Angola flag proposal (1966)

Alleged tricolor proposal (1996)

Catica's Tchitundo-Hulu Sun proposal (2003)

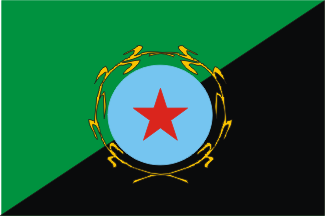
Alleged bicolour diagonal proposal with symbol (2014)

== Armenia ==
In 1885, Ghevont Alishan, an Armenian Catholic priest and historian proposed 2 Armenian flags. The first is a horizontal tricolor flag of red-green-white, with red and green coming from the Armenian Catholic calendar, in which the first Sunday of Easter is called "Red Sunday" and the second Sunday is "Green Sunday", with white being added for design reasons. He then made another flag proposal, a vertical tricolor of red-green-blue, taken from the rainbow.

In 1918, in the stage of deciding on what the flag should look like, artist Martiros Saryan proposed some flags, two of which were flags with the colors of the rainbow. He wrote, “there are many tricolors, multi-colored flag would be more suitable for us, because we are an oriental nation”. His drawings fell into oscurity, being only revealed in the 2000s.

Father Ghevont Alishan's first proposal (1885)

Father Ghevont Alishan's second proposal (1885)

Saryan's first rainbow flag proposal (1918)

Saryan's second rainbow flag proposal (1918)

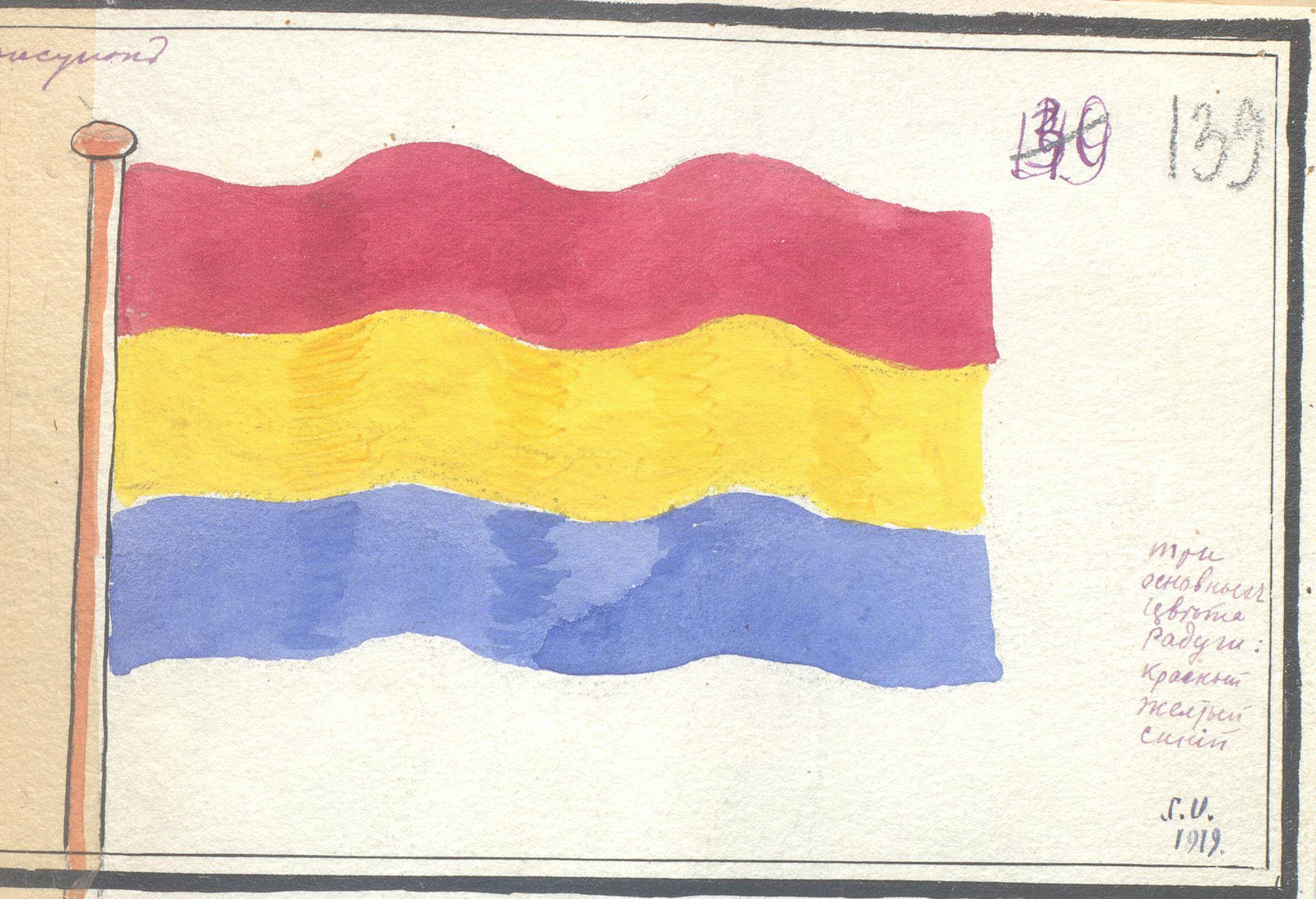
Another of Saryan's proposals (1918)

Anonymous proposal (1940s)

Anonymous proposal (1940s)

Anonymous proposal (1940s)

Anonymous proposal (1940s)

Anonymous proposal (1940s)

Anonymous proposal (1940s)

Anonymous proposal (1940s)

Anonymous proposal (1940s)

== Australia ==
The first flag that was considered as a proposal to represent the Australian people is the Eureka flag. Several demonstrators swore allegiance to the flag and flew it as a symbol of defiance during the Battle of the Eureka Stockade in 1854.

In 1900, seeing how Federation approached and so would the need for a flag, the Melbourne Evening Herald initiated a contest promising a prize of 25 australian pounds to the winner. Entries were mandated to contain the Union Jack and the southern cross in their designs. The designs by Mr. F. Thompson was chosen as the winner.

This contest then prompted the Review of Reviews, also a Melbourne journal, to come up with a new competition in October 1900. They neglected the decision of obliging participants to include certain elements on the design of the flag.

Later, in 1901, the newly-formed Commonwealth Government held an official competition, which also included the proposals made to the Review of Reviews competitions in 1900. Five winners were chosen, with their designs only differing in small details. The first Australian flag was tuned using elements from this five winners.

However, the Australian flag debate has been a topic of discussion for years, dating back to the early 1990s after the adoption of the official flag after Federation. The main points of the debate on whether Australia should adopt a new flag discuss the elimination of the Union Jack, and the representation of Australia's complex and multicultural history. This prompted several unofficial redesign contests, such as the ones by The Daily Telegraph in 1982, Adelaide Advertiser in 1992, and A Current Affair in 1993, among many others.

"Bowman Flag" (1806)

"National Colonial Flag" (1824)

"Australian Federation Flag" (1831)

Eureka Flag (1854)

The Herald contest flag (blue) (1900)

The Herald contest flag (red) (1900)

1901 Federal Flag Design Competition contest flag

Proposed British Empire flag in Australia (1902)

Proposed flag by the Republican Socialist League (1956)

Finalist in Daily Telegraph contest (1982)

The Advertiser contest flag (1992)

A Current Affair contest flag (1993)

Reconciliation flag (2013)

"Southern horizon" (2014)

Golden Wattle Flag (2015)

== Bahamas ==
In 1973, when the flag design for the Bahamas was submitted for approval to the Garter King of Arms, the head of the College of Arms, Sir Anthony Wagner, proposed that the gold and aquamarine stripes swapped colours. Nevertheless, this change never took place, and the current Bahamian flag was adopted.

Rejected Flag Proposal (1973)

== Belarus ==
In 1990, the authorities of Minsk allowed the use of the white-red-white national flag along with the state flag of the SSR. This led to many opposition supporters to create more proposals bearing this design, including flags with the Pahonia contained in the red stripe, and some even resembling a Nordic cross due to the addition of a red bar towards the hoist.

Right after declaring independence from the USSR in 1991, the special sixth session of the XII Council of the Belarusian SSR commenced with the objective to address several topics, including the republic's name, state flag, and coat of arms. Flag designs were submitted by the public, many involving the colours red, green, and blue.

In 1993, the future president Alexander Lukashenko proposed a referendum to change the flag, but was rejected. Once he became president in 1995, Lukashenko proposed a version that consisted of two thin green stripes top and bottom, and a central red field. This flag, alongside a version similar to the one used by the SSR without the hammer and sickle, were put forward for a referendum, including their respective coat of arms designs. The latter won the referendum and was adopted as the current flag of Belarus.

Proposal 1 (1991)

Proposal 2 (1991)

Nordic Cross proposal (1992)

Alexander Lukashenko's Proposal (1995)

Nordic Cross Proposal (2016)

== Belgium ==
In 2008, Belgian artist Luc Swinnen made a proposal to the Belgian flag, adding pixels blurring the lines between the stripes to symbolize Belgium's interwoven cultures and languages.

In 2010, Dutch designer Theun Okkerse proposed a new Belgian flag, with a yellow-black-yellow background representing the Flemish people combined with a yellow-red-yellow design representing the Walloons, and their intersection creating four "arrows" pointing to the center of the flag.

In 2011, Belgian cartoonist Pierre Kroll designed a new flag for Belgium, divided into four squares, colored yellow, red, blue, and white. Yellow representing the Flemish people, red representing the Walloons, blue representing Brussels, and white representing the German-speaking Community of Belgium.

Luc Swinnen Proposal (2008)

Theun Okkerse's Proposal (2010)

Pierre Kroll's Proposal (2011)

== Bolivia ==
After winning Bolivia's presidency and in the wake of Bolivia's constitutional reforms, discussions of changing the flag were engaged. Evo Morales appeared at a football match with the following flag on his jersey in October 2006, made of the Bolivian colors crossed by the wiphala. In the end, no change was made. Then, in September 2025, Rodrigo Paz Proposed a Design With a Blue Background and a White Crescent and Star as Part of a Design Competition.

Evo Morales Proposal (2006)

Rodrigo Paz Proposal (2025)

== Bosnia and Herzegovina* ==
In 1992 and 1997, several flag proposals were given for Bosnia and Herzegovina.

In 1992, one of the proposals was a horizontal tricolor of green-red-blue tricolor with green representing Bosniaks, red representing Croats, and blue representing Serbs.

Another flag from that time was proposed, it being the accepted flag but with blue bands at the left and right sides.

Another one, proposed by defenders of Sarajevo, consisted of a blue triangle in the bottom-right taking up half of the flag with 3 fleur-de-lis, and the other half of the flag consisting of 6 red and white stripes, making the Pan-Slavic colors.

In 1997, a flag change was again happening as Bosnian Serbs considered the accepted flag of representing only Bosniaks. There was a "Czech"-style proposal, with a blue triangle for Eastern Orthodox Serbs, green bar for Sunni Muslim Bosniaks, and red bar for Latin Catholic Croats. There were also 2 proposals of a light blue background, one with an olive branch and the other with a map of Bosnia and Herzegovina on it, likely meant to be uncontroversial designs.

There were four other similar proposals, all containing a map of Bosnia, either blue or yellow, within a red-white-blue tricolor, either diagonal or horizontal, within either 10 stars in a circle, or 2 olive branches taken from the Flag of the United Nations.

Three proposals were made by High Representative Carlos Westendorp, one being the adopted flag but with a shade of blue similar to the UN flag, another containing 5 stripes coming from each side of the flag without reaching the other side in yellow and white on a UN-like blue background, and the final being the same as the previous but with 12 stripes and them forming a triangle in the flag's center.

Crescent moon flag proposal (1990s)

Bosnian Tricolor Proposal (1992)

Bosnian Democratic Union Proposal (1992)

Defenders of Sarajevo Proposal (1992)

First Proposal From the 1st Set (1997)

Second Proposal From the 1st Set (1997)

Third Proposal From the 1st Set (1997)

First Proposal From the 2nd Set (1997)

Second Proposal From the 2nd Set (1997)

Third Proposal From the 2nd Set (1997)

Fourth Proposal From the 2nd Set (1997)

First Westendorp Proposal (1997)

Second Westendorp Proposal (1997)

Third Westendorp Proposal (1997)

== Brazil ==
In 1888, Júlio Ribeiro designed a flag for a Brazilian republic, it had fifteen alternating black and white stripes, a red rectangle in the canton, containing a blue map of Brazil inside a white circle with 4 yellow stars on each corner of the canton, it eventually became the flag of the state of São Paulo.

In 1890, Antônio da Silva Jardim also a designed a Brazilian republican flag, a black-red-white tricolor with a coat of arms centered on it.

Also in 1890, José Paranhos, Baron of Rio Branco proposed a similar design, a black-white-red diagonal tricolor with a coat of arms, similar to the imperial arms centered on it.

In 1892, Oliveira Valadão proposed changing the accepted Flag of Brazil by removing the blue circle, the stars, and the motto and instead adding the coat of arms.

In 1908, Wenceslau Escobar proposed removing the motto "ORDEM E PROGRESSO" because according to him, the flag cannot have a "motto of a sect (Positivism)".

In 1908, Eurico de Góes proposed going back to the imperial flag, but without a shield or crown, and instead a white star. He later in 1922, proposed a similar flag but without the white star, or the globe, and the red cross and light blue circle being expanded and centered on the yellow rhombus.

Júlio Ribeiro's Proposal (1888)

Antônio da Silva Jardim's Proposal (1890)

José Maria da Silva Paranhos Proposal (1890)

Oliveira Valadão Proposal (1892)

Wenceslau Escobar Proposal (1908)

Eurico de Góis' Proposal (1908)

Eurico de Góis' Proposal (1922)

== Bulgaria ==
Around 1915, King Ferdinand proposed a new flag for Bulgaria, a black-white-blue horizontal tricolor, black representing the Black Sea, white representing the Aegean Sea, and blue representing the Adriatic Sea.

King Ferdinand's Proposal (c.1915)

== Cameroon ==
There were several proposals for German colonies to get their own flags and heraldry. In 1914, Wilhelm Solf proposed a flag for Cameroon, the Flag of the German Empire with the proposed shield on it or the shield's symbol within a circle.

Dr Wilhelm Solf's German Kamerun Proposal (1914)

Variant of Dr Wilhelm Solf's German Kamerun Proposal (1914)

== Canada ==
In 1902, the Daily Express reported that a series of flags were being proposed to replace the Union Jack everywhere in the British Empire aside from the United Kingdom itself. The goal was to provide a flags more representative of the people of each area they would be used in. As described, the flags would have featured the Cross of Saint George and an imperial crown in the canton to represent the English. In the top right would be the emblem of the territory flying the flag, and in the case of Canada, its coat of arms. A large sun in the centre symbolized "the empire on which the sun never sets."

In 1930, the newspaper La Presse proposed a new Canadian flag, which had won a contest the newspaper had held a few years earlier. It was a white flag, with a Union Jack canton, 7 five-point blue stars making up the Big Dipper, and a larger 8-pointed North Star in the top-right quarter of the flag.

In 1939, Ephrem Cote proposed a flag with 3 sections. It had a blue triangle in the top-left, containing the Union Jack for English Canadians, a red triangle in the bottom-right, containing a fleur-de-lis for French Canadians, and a thick white line from the bottom-left to the top-right between the two containing a green maple leaf.

In 1946, it was proposed that the current Red Ensign flag of Canada should have the shield replaced with a golden maple leaf.

In 1947, Adélard Godbout proposed a flag, diagonally divided with one white triangle in the bottom-left and one red triangle in the top-right, and a green maple leaf in the center.

In 1956, Jean-François Pouliot proposed that the Canadian flag be a red background with a green maple leaf centered on it.

In 1962, Luc-André Biron proposed a green polar star symbol on a white background as the flag.

In 1964 during Great Canadian flag debate, several flags were proposed. The flag initially preferred by Prime Minister Lester B. Pearson was a flag designed by Alan Beddoe, with 2 blue bars at each end and a red set of 3 maple leaves connected by one stem in the center, and it became known as the "Pearson Pennant". Another proposed flag made by Beddoe was the accepted Flag of Canada, but with the British flag in the top-left, and the Royal Banner of France in the top-right.

There was also a proposal from 1964, seemingly taking elements from the Flag of the United Kingdom, and the Flag of the United States, with a blue background, a red cross with a white border, a green maple leaf in the center, and 10 white stars within the cross.

There was also a proposal with the left-half of the flag red, and the right-half white, and 10 maple leaves across the whole flag.

There was also a proposal in 1965 by the Native Sons of Canada, with a red triangle in the top-right taking half of the flag, and a darker red maple leaf in the center.

After the flag debate and the current Flag of Canada got accepted, another proposal came to represent French ties in Canada, that being the Canadian Unity Flag, which adds 2 small blue bars to the edges of the white center bar to represent French Canadians.

Proposed national flag by Sir Donald A. Smith (1895)

Proposal for a 'Meteor Flag of the Dominion' by Sir Sanford Fleming (1895)

Proposed national flag by H. Spencer Howell of the Canadian Club of Hamilton, Ontario (1895)

E. M. Chadwick's Proposed National Flag / Blue Ensign of Canada (1896)

E. M. Chadwick's Proposed National Flag and Red Ensign of Canada (1896)

Barlow Cumberland Proposal (1897)

Proposed British Empire flag in Canada (1902)

C. F. Hamilton Proposal (1909)

Manitoba Free Press Proposal (1916)

Minnie H. Bowen Proposal (1920s)

J. S. Ewart Proposal (c. 1921)

Edwin J. Cox Proposal (1921)

A. Fortescue Duguid Proposal (1925)

William S. Simpson Proposal (1925)

Winner of the 1926 La Presse contest to design a national flag. Design credited concurrently to Edwin Tappan Adney, Charles Lapierre, Joseph-Edouard Roy, and Isidore Renaud. (1926)

W. A. W. Hames Proposal (1928)

Mrs. H. E. Dunford Proposal (1929)

La Presse Proposal (1930)

Maurice Brodeur Proposal (1930)

Gérard Gallienne's Proposal (c.1931)

Ramsay Traquair Proposal (1934)

National Council of Native Sons of Canada Proposal (1934)

Frank G. J. McDonagh Proposal (1935)

Ephrem Côté's Proposal (1939)

Ligue du Drapeau National's proposal for Flag of Canada, adopted by the Native Sons of Canada c.1958 (c.1943 and c.1958)

Eugène Achard's Proposal (1944)

A. Fortescue Duguid's second Proposal (1945)

Rev. Dan McIvor Proposal (1945)

Red Ensign Proposal (1946)

D. F. Stedman's proposal (1946)

Archer Fortescue Duguid Proposal (1946)

J Leroy Holman Proposal (1946)

Charles Robitaille Proposal (1946)

Adélard Godbout Proposal (1947)

T. G. A. Henstridge Proposal (1948)

A. L. Caron Proposal (1953)

Florian A. Legace's proposal, the 'Canadian Union Jack' (1954)

John Lorne MacDougall's proposal (1954)

Proposal of J.W. Bradfield of the Toronto Young Men's Canadian Club (1955)

Alan Beddoe's Proposal (1955)

André Barbeau's Proposal (1955)

Jean-Francois Pouliot Proposal (1957)

Alfred Stagg's Proposal (1957)

Jean Dubuc's Proposal (c.1958)

Leslie Frost's Proposal (1959)

Marcel Boivin's Proposal (1959)

Graeme Consiglio Proposal (1960)

Paul-Emile Marcoux's Proposal (1961)

Luc-André Biron's Proposal (1962)

Rolland Lavoie's Proposal (1963)

Forrest C. Nickerson's Proposal (1963)

James Sanders's Proposal (1963)

Leslie Coppold's Proposal (1963)

Carl Dair's Proposal (1963)

Grant Hewlett's Proposal (1963)

Proposal of Reid Scott of the New Democratic Party made during the Great Flag Debate (1964)

Proposal made during the Great Flag Debate featuring four maple leaves (1964)

Alan Beddoe Proposal (1964)

Stars & Leaf Proposal (1964)

Proposal made during the Great Flag Debate featuring ten maple leaves (1964)

"Pearson Pennant" Proposal (1964)

Stanley Marsh Proposal (1964)

J. C. Proposal (1964)

Proposal for Flag of Canada, by George F. G. Stanley (1964)

George F. G. Stanley's alternate proposal for Flag of Canada, his Option B (1964)

Proposed flag for Canada, by George Matthias Bist (1964)

Proposal made during Great Flag Debate, Parliamentary Committee "Group B" finalist and Committee final selection. (1964)

An intermediate manufactured prototype of the 1964 Parliamentary flag committee's final selection. (1964)

A.Y. Jackson Proposal (1964)

Prevost Proposal (1964)

D.F Stedman Proposal (1964)

Joyce Mancuso Proposal (1964)

Ellis W. Howard Proposal (1964)

Marcel Therrien Proposal (1964)

Jennifer Robinson Proposal (1964)

René Laflamme Proposal (1964)

Elzéar Deschatelets Proposal (1964)

Louise C. Savage Proposal (1964)

W. D. West Proposal (1964)

John Ensor Proposal (1964)

Germain Tremblay Proposal (1964)

A.R.C Jones Proposal (1964)

Anonymous Proposal (1964)

Anonymous Proposal (1964)

Anonymous Proposal (1964)

Anonymous Proposal (1964)

Anonymous Proposal (1964)

Anonymous Proposal (1964)

Anonymous Proposal (1964)

Anonymous Proposal (1964)

Anonymous Proposal (1964)

Anonymous Proposal (1964)

Anonymous Proposal (1964)

Anonymous Proposal (1964)

Anonymous Proposal (1964)

Anonymous Proposal (1964)

Anonymous Proposal (1964)

Native Sons of Canada Proposal (1965)

"Canadian Duality Flag" Proposal (1994)

"The Unilisé" Proposal (1996)

== Cape Verde ==
In 1967, F. P. de Almeida Langhans designed designs for Portuguese colonies including Cape Verde, with a Flag of Portugal with a shield of the colony's lesser arms.

Proposed colonial flag (1932)

Almeida Langhans' Cape Verde Proposal (1967)

== Central African Republic ==
In the summer of 1976, after a meeting with Libyan leader Muammar Gaddafi, Central African leader Jean-Bédel Bokassa converted to Islam, probably to get Libyan aid, and a project was undertaken to adopt a new national flag with Islamic symbolism. It was proposed that the top-left quarter be split into equal horizontal stripes of yellow and white, with the rest of the flag being green with a yellow star and crescent. This proposal was short-lived, as Bokassa quickly converted back to Roman Catholicism.

Replacement flag proposal (1976)

== Chile Republic ==
Proposal (1818)

== China ==
=== Republic of China ===
Teo Eng Hock's Proposal (1906) (Republic of China)

Proposal 2 (1906) (Republic of China)

Proposal 3 (1906) (Republic of China)

Proposal 4 (1906) (Republic of China)

Proposal 5 (1906) (Republic of China)

=== People's Republic of China ===
See: List of Chinese Flags/Flag proposals

Several flags were proposed in 1949 for the People's Republic of China, most of which contain red and yellow colors as well as stars due to communist symbolism.

Mao Zedong's proposal containing a yellow star and a yellow stripe on a white background was initially favored, but there was criticism of it being interpreted as "the fruits of the revolution being cut off".

Mao Zedong's Proposal (1949)

Zeng Liansong's Proposal 1 (1949)

Zeng Liansong's Proposal 2 (1949)

Alternative Proposal 1 (1949)

Alternative Proposal 2 (1949)

Proposal 001 (1949)

Proposal 002 (1949)

Proposal 003 (1949)

Proposal 004 (1949)

Proposal 005 (1949)

Proposal 006 (1949)

Proposal 007 (1949)

Proposal 008 (1949)

Proposal 009 (1949)

Proposal 010 (1949)

Proposal 011 (1949)

Proposal 012 (1949)

Proposal 013 (1949)

Proposal 014 (1949)

Proposal 015 (1949)

Proposal 016 (1949)

Proposal 017 (1949)

Proposal 018 (1949)

Proposal 019 (1949)

Proposal 020 (1949)

Proposal 021 (1949)

Proposal 022 (1949)

Proposal 023 (1949)

Proposal 024 (1949)

Proposal 025 (1949)

Proposal 026 (1949)

Proposal 027 (1949)

Proposal 028 (1949)

Proposal 029 (1949)

Proposal 030 (1949)

Proposal 031 (1949)

Proposal 32 (1949)

Proposal 33 (1949)

Proposal 34 (1949)

Proposal 35 (1949)

Proposal 36 (1949)

Proposal 37 (1949)

Proposal 38 (1949)

Proposal 39 (1949)

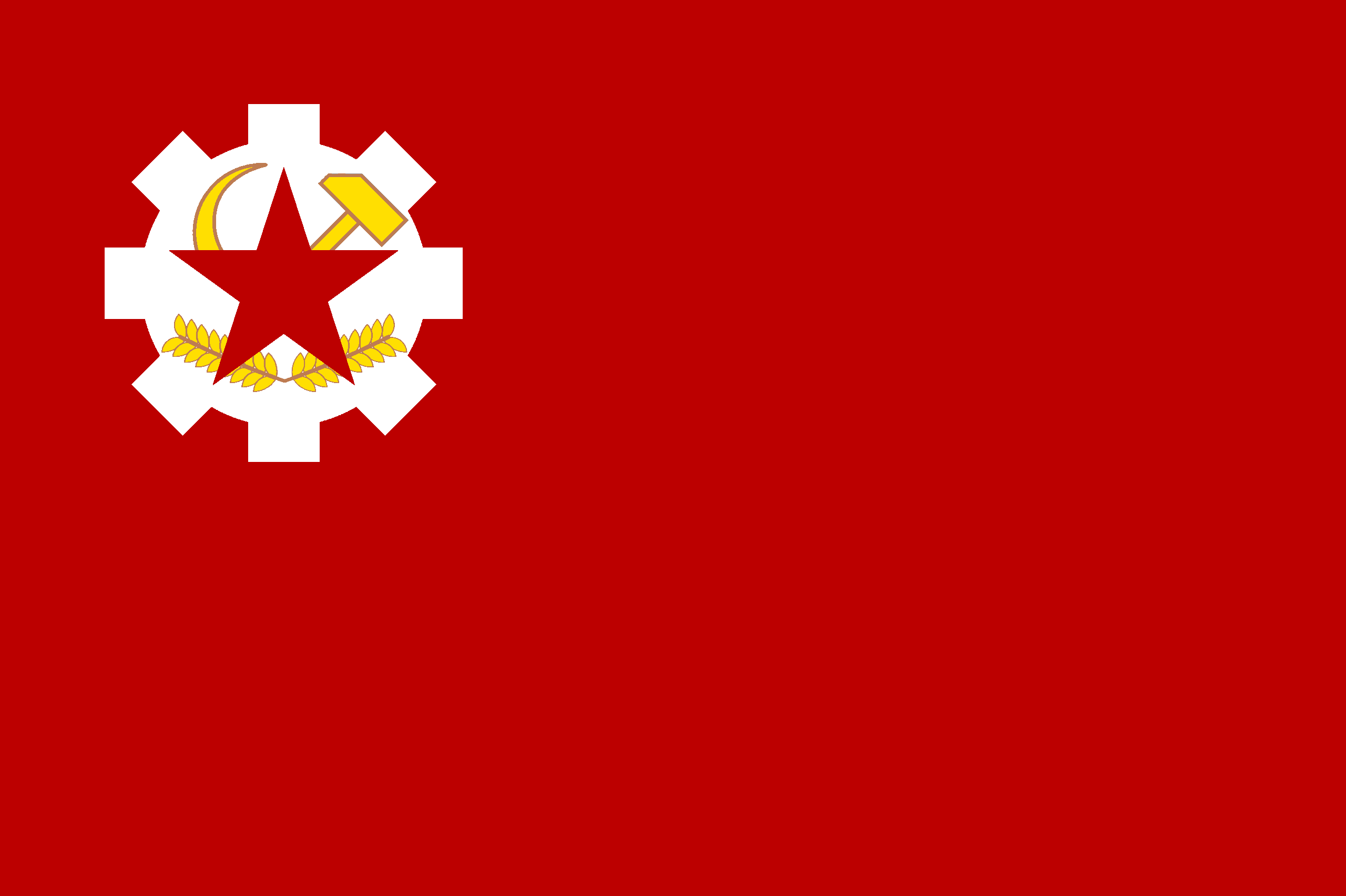
Proposal 40 (1949)

Proposal 41 (1949)

Proposal 42 (1949)

Proposal 43 (1949)

Proposal 44 (1949)

Proposal 45 (1949)

Proposal 46 (1949)

Proposal 47 (1949)

Proposal 48 (1949)

Proposal 49 (1949)

Proposal 50 (1949)

Proposal 51 (1949)

Proposal 52 (1949)

Proposal 53 (1949)

Proposal 54 (1949)

=== Hong Kong ===
Proposal 1 (1988)

Proposal 2 (1988)

Proposal 3 (1988)

Proposal 4 (1988)

Proposal 5 (1988)

Proposal 6 (1988)

Proposal 7 (1988)

Proposal 8 (1988)

Proposal 9 (1988)

Proposal 10 (1988)

Proposal 11 (1988)

Proposal 12 (1988)

Proposal 13 (1988)

Proposal 14 (1988)

Proposal 15 (1988)

Proposal 16 (1988)

=== Macau ===
Proposed colonial flag of Macau (1932)

Almeida Langhans' Portuguese Macau Proposal (1967)

Proposal 1 (1993)

Proposal 2 (1993)

Proposal 3 (1993)

Proposal 4 (1993)

Proposal 5 (1993)

Proposal 6 (1993)

Proposal 7 (1993)

Proposal 8 (1993)

Proposal 9 (1993)

Proposal 10 (1993)

Proposal 11 (1993)

Proposal 12 (1993)

Proposal 13 (1993)

== Colombia ==
Gran Colombia 4th Flag Proposal (1822)

New Granada Flag Proposal (1833)

== Costa Rica ==
In 1845, liberals proposed a new color to be added to the flag of Costa Rica, red, as the flag of France, associated with liberty had red, white, and blue. It may also take inspiration from the flag of the United States.

Unaccepted proposal (1845)

== Croatia* ==
Proposal by Krsto Mažuranić (1990).

Proposals by Boris Ljubičić (1990)

== Cyprus ==
The British colonial administration's rejected proposal for the flag of independent Cyprus (1959).

United Republic of Cyprus flag proposal (2004)

== Czech Republic (Czechia) ==
Proposal 1 (1992)

Proposal 2 (1992)

== Democratic Republic of the Congo ==
Congo-Léopoldville Federalist Proposal (1960)

== Denmark ==
=== Greenland ===
Sven Tito Achen's Proposal (1984)

Andersson's Proposal (1991)

Aĸigssiaĸ Møller & others' Proposal (1973)

Stephen Petersen's Proposal (1974)

Dannebrog Proposal (1974)

Clifford Crantz's Proposal (1974)

Maniitsoq's Students' Proposal (1974)

E. J.'s Proposal (1974)

Gaba Rasmussen's Proposal (1974)

Nikolaj Fly Petersen's Proposal (1974)

Peter Olsvig Proposal 1 (1974)

Peter Olsvig Proposal 2 (1974)

David Aronsen Proposal (1978)

Edvard Kleist's Proposal (1978)

Gert K. Davidsen's Proposal (1978)

Jens Geisler's Proposal 1 (1978)

Jens Geisler's Proposal 2 (1978)

Jens Geisler's Proposal 3 (1978)

Geerth Karlsen's Proposal (1978)

Anonymous Proposal 1 (1978)

Anonymous Proposal 2 (1978)

Anonymous Proposal 3 (1978)

Anonymous Proposal 4 (1978)

Anonymous Proposal 5 (1978)

Anonymous Proposal 6 (1978)

Anonymous Proposal 7 (1978)

== Egypt ==
23 July Revolution Proposal 1 (1952)

23 July Revolution Proposal 2 (1952)

23 July Revolution Proposal 3 (1952)

23 July Revolution Proposal 4 (1952)

23 July Revolution Proposal 5 (1952)

23 July Revolution Proposal 6 (1952)

23 July Revolution Proposal 7 (1952)

23 July Revolution Proposal 8 (1952)

July 23 Revolution Proposal 9 (1952)

== Estonia* ==
Nordic Proposal 1 (1919)

Nordic Proposal 2 (1919)

Nordic Proposal 3 (1919)

Nordic Proposal 4 (2001)

== Fiji ==
Greater Arms Proposal (2005)

Alternative Proposal (2005)

Proposal 1 (2015)

Proposal 2/3 (2015)

Proposal 4/5 (2015)

Proposal 6 (2015)

Proposal 8 (2015)

Proposal 9/10 (2015)

Proposal 11 (2015)

Proposal 12 (2015)

Proposal 13 (2015)

Proposal 14 (2015)

Proposal 15 (2015)

Proposal 16 (2015)

Proposal 17 (2015)

Proposal 19 (2015)

Proposal 20 (2015)

Proposal 21 (2015)

Proposal 22 (2015)

Proposal 23 (2015)

== Finland ==
Zacharias Topelius' Proposal (pre-1863)

Maamies' Proposal (1863)

Otto Donner's Proposal (1863)

Hugo Nyberg's Proposal (1863)

J. Penger's Proposal (1863)

Alternative Proposal (c.1864)

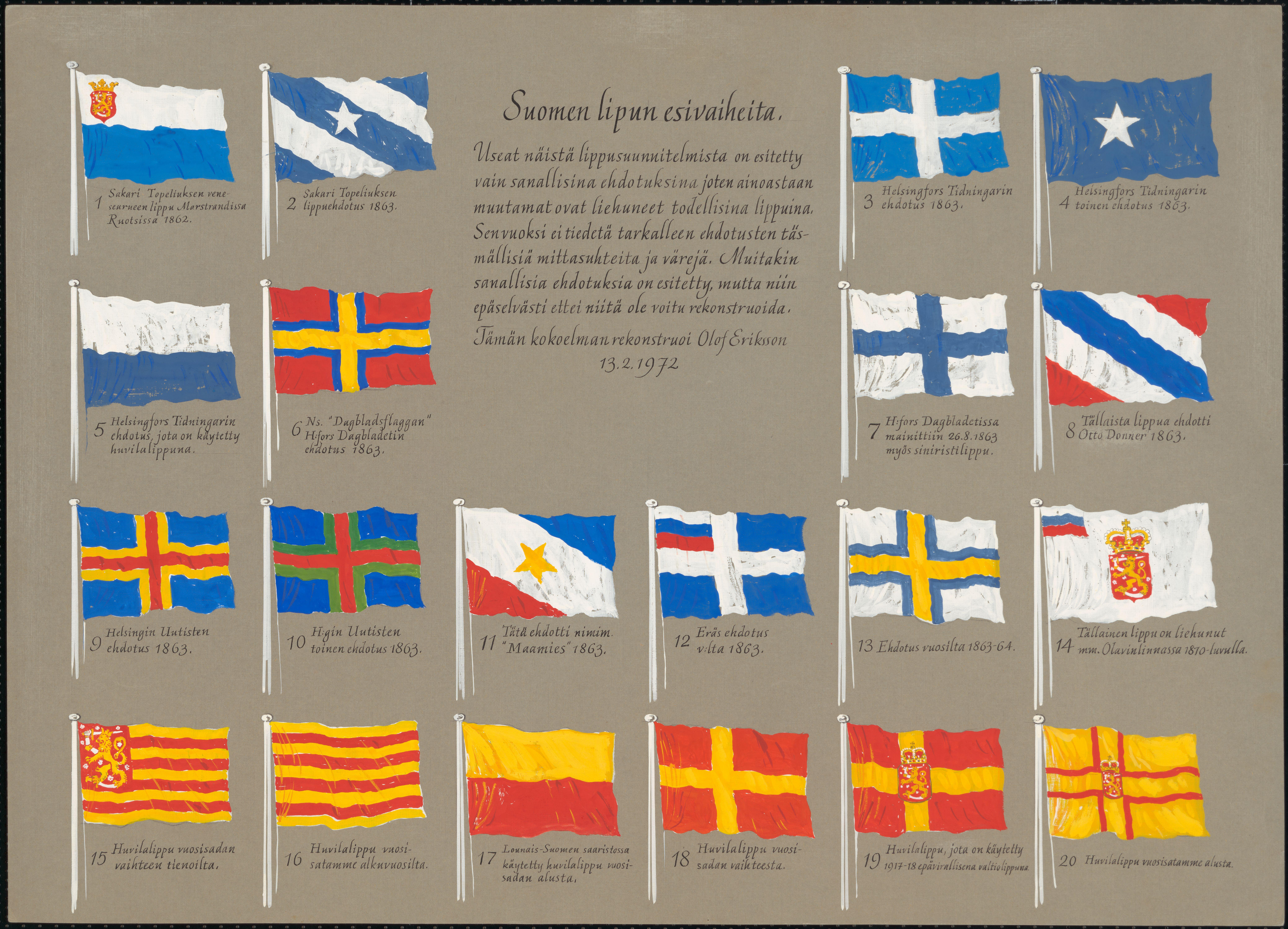
Proposed flags of Finland (1918)

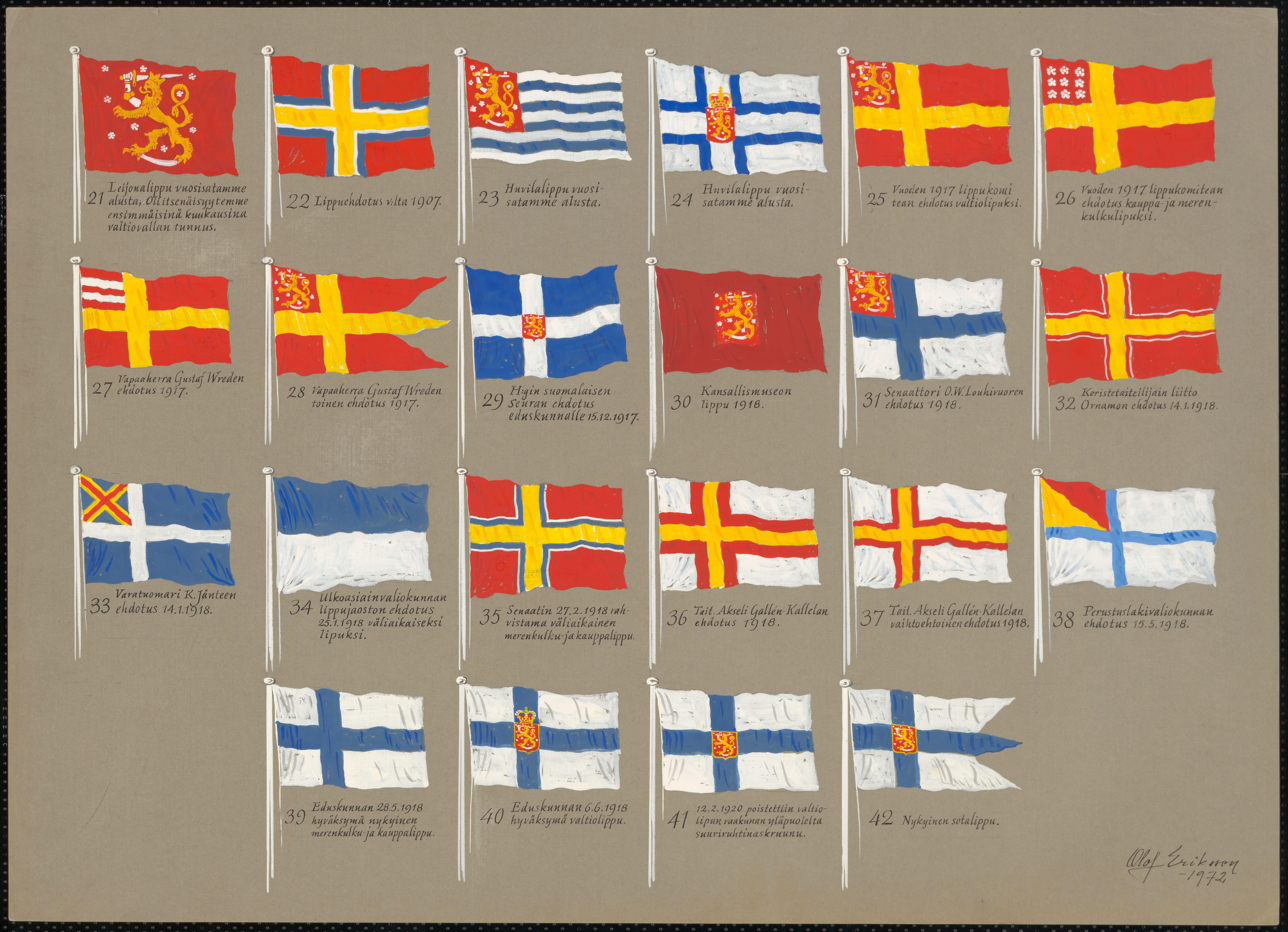
Proposed flags of Finland (1918)

=== Åland ===
In 1952, Åland was given right to a flag by the Finnish government, and several proposals from the past and that time were considered.

Many of them were inspired off of the Flag of Sweden due to the region's Swedish culture and language, including a "Swedish" flag proposal, a Swedish flag with a blue cross on it. It was denied by the President of Finland for being too similar to the flag of Sweden.

There was also the "Plague Flag" or "Pestflaggen", which was nicknamed that for being considered too unattractive a design.

Matts Dreijer's proposal (1939)

"Swedish" flag proposal (1952)

"Finnish" flag proposal (1954)

Matts Dreijer's proposal (1946)

The "Plague Flag" (1950s)

Debate proposal 1 (1953)

Debate proposal 2 (1953)

Debate proposal 3 (1953)

== France ==
Proposal possibly made by Henri d'Artois, comte de Chambord in his younger years as a compromise, but which was never made official, and which he himself rejected when offered the throne in 1870. (1850)

Hervé, Baron Pinoteau Proposal (ca. 2010)

=== French Guiana ===
Guyanese Workers' Union Proposal (2004)

=== Guadeloupe ===
Flag proposed By GONG (1963)

Guadeloupe independence flag proposed by the UPLG (1978)

Unofficial Flag used by locals (2001)

Red variant (2001)

=== Martinique ===
Snake Flag (1766)

Proposed flag by MIM (1978)

The Ipséité Flag (2019)

=== Mayotte ===
Unofficial flag of Mayotte (1982)

Black text variant (1982)

=== New Caledonia ===
Defaced French Flag Proposal (2008)

"Common Flag" Proposal (2010)

"Common Flag" Variant Proposal (2010)

=== Réunion ===
First unofficial flag proposal (1995)

Association for the Réunion Flag proposal (1996)

Association for the Réunion Flag proposal (2003)

Independent Réunion Proposal (2008)

=== Saint Barthelémy ===
Unofficial flag of Saint Barthelemy (2007)

Official flag of Saint Barthelemy (2017)

=== Saint Martin ===
St. Martin Unity Flag (1990)

Independent Saint Martin Proposal (2000)

=== Saint Pierre and Miquelon ===
Unofficial flag of Saint Pierre and Miquelon (1982)

Official Flag of Saint Pierre and Miquelon (1992)

=== Wallis and Futuna ===
Unofficial flag of Wallis and Futuna (1887)

Unofficial flag of Wallis and Futuna (1910)

Unofficial flag of Walis and Futuna (1976)

Unofficial flag of Wallis and Futuna (1985)

Unofficial flag of Wallis and Futuna (2020)

Official flag of Wallis and Futuna (2025)

== Germany* ==
German Unification flag at Wartburg Festival (1817)

German unification flag at Hambach Festival (1832)

Ottfried Neubecker's Proposal (1926)

Robert Lehr's Proposal (1948)

Paul Wentzcke's Proposal (1948)

Edwin Redslob's Proposal (1948)

Josef Wirmer's Proposal (1944–1948)

Ernst Wirmer's Proposal (1948)

Anonymous proposal (1940-50s)

Anonymous proposal (1940-50s)

Anonymous proposal (1940-50s)

Anonymous proposal (1940-50s)

Anonymous proposal (1940-50s)

Anonymous proposal (1940-50s)

Anonymous proposal (1940-50s)

Anonymous proposal (1940-50s)

Anonymous proposal (1940-50s)

Anonymous proposal (1940-50s)

Anonymous proposal (1940-50s)

Anonymous proposal (1940-50s)

Anonymous proposal (1940-50s)

Anonymous proposal (1940-50s)

Anonymous proposal (1940-50s)

Anonymous proposal (1940-50s)

Anonymous proposal (1940-50s)

Anonymous proposal (1940-50s)

Anonymous proposal (1940-50s)

Anonymous proposal (1940-50s)

Anonymous proposal (1940-50s)

Anonymous proposal (1940-50s)

Anonymous proposal (1940-50s)

Anonymous proposal (1940-50s)

Anonymous proposal (1940-50s)

Anonymous proposal (1940-50s)

Anonymous proposal (1940-50s)

Anonymous proposal (1940-50s)

Anonymous proposal (1940-50s)

Anonymous proposal (1940-50s)

Anonymous proposal (1940-50s)

Anonymous proposal (1940-50s)

Anonymous proposal (1940-50s)

Anonymous proposal (1940-50s)

== Ghana ==
Emmanuel Enoch Agbozo's Proposal (2002)

== Guinea-Bissau ==
In June 1932, while working for the Portuguese Institute of Heraldry (IPH), Affonso Dornellas elaborated a coat of arms for the Colony of Guinea and João Ricardo da Silva drew it. Even though the Estado Novo's Agência Geral das Colónias (General Agency of the Colonies) had asked for the shield, it was never officially adopted. Like other designs, a modified version was used at the 1934 Colonial Exposition of Porto and on posterior coins before the introduction of the 1935 shield design.

In 1966, heraldist Franz Paul de Almeira Langhans designed flags for Portuguese ultramarine provinces in his book "Armorial do Ultramar Português", being Guinea's the Flag of Portugal defaced with the colony's lesser arms shield on its lower fly side.

IPH's Colony of Guinea flag proposal (1932)

Langhans' Overseas Province of Guinea flag proposal (1966)

== Guyana ==
Whitney Smith's Original Proposal (1962)

== Hungary ==
Ignác Martinovics's Proposal (1794)

Sándor Széll's Proposal (1941)

Hungarian People's Republic Proposal (1949)

Pál Tóth's Proposal (1995)

István Mező and János Olasz's Proposal (1995)

Miklós Csapody's Proposal (2005)

Draft Constitution Proposal (2010)

== Iceland ==
Constitutional Commission's proposal (1885)

The Hvítbláinn Proposal (1913)

Magnus Thordarson's Proposal (1914)

== India ==
Proposed British Empire flag in India (1902)

Anglo-India Weekly's Proposal (1904)

Louis Mountbatten's Proposal (1947)

Mahatma Gandhi's Original Proposal (1921)

Mahatma Gandhi's Final Proposal (1921)

=== Karnataka ===
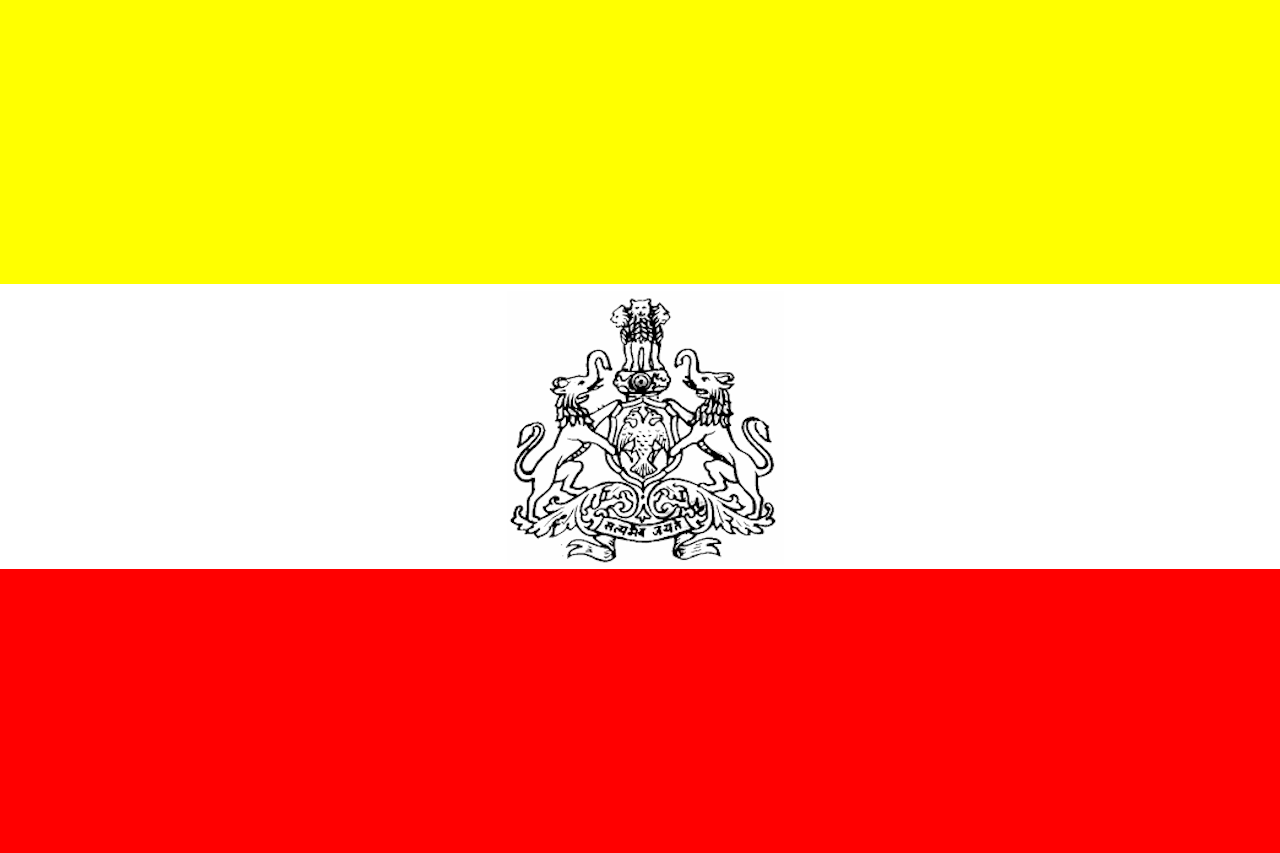
Proposed Karnataka Flag (2018)

=== Portuguese India ===
Colonial Flag of Portuguese India (1932)

Almeida Langhans' Portuguese India Proposal (1967)

=== Tamil Nadu ===
Proposed flag of Tamil Nadu (1970)

== Iraq ==
IGC Proposal (2004)

Eight-Pointed Star Proposal (2008)

Yellow Takbir Proposal (2008)

== Ireland ==
Anonymous proposal submitted to The Irish Times; United Ireland (1928)

Anonymous proposal (1937)

Anonymous proposal to The Irish Times (1939)

Anonymous proposal from The Drogheda Independent (1951)

John Harrington's Proposal (1957)

Flag proposed for a Communist Ireland by the Communist Party of Ireland (Marxist–Leninist) (1976)

== Israel* ==
Ha'Degel Proposal 1 (1948)

Ha'Degel Proposal 2 (1948)

Ha'Degel Proposal 3 (1948)

Ha'Degel Proposal 4 (1948)

Ha'Degel Proposal 5 (1948)

Ha'Degel Proposal 6 (1948)

Ha'Degel Proposal 7 (1948)

Ha'Degel Proposal 8 (1948)

Contest Proposal 44 (1948)

Contest Proposal 57 (1948)

Contest Proposal 58 (1948)

Contest Proposal 61 (1948)

Otta Wallish's Proposal (1949)

Nissim Sabah's Proposal (1949)

Theodor Herzl's Proposal (1890s)

== Italy ==
=== Lombardy ===
Saint Ambrose/Saint George's flag, proposed several times, a being the historical flag since middle ages.

Proposal 1 for a new flag for Lombardy (Region) (2015)

Proposal 2 for a new flag for Lombardy (Region) (2015)

== Ivory Coast ==
Augustin Loubao's Proposal (1960)

== Jamaica ==
Proposal 1 (1962)

Proposal 2 (1962)

Proposal 3 (1962)

Proposal 4 (1962)

Proposal 5 (1962)

Proposal 6 (1962)

Proposal 7 (1962)

Proposal 8 (1962)

== Japan ==
=== Okinawa ===
Proposed flag of the Independent State of Okinawa (1950)

Proposed flag by USCAR (1954)

== Kazakhstan ==
Proposal 1 (1991)

Proposal 2 (1991)

Proposal 3 (1991)

Proposal 4 (1991)

Proposal 5 (1991)

Proposal 6 (1991)

Proposal 7 (1991)

Proposal 8 (1992)

== Kosovo ==
Ibrahim Rugova's proposal (2000)

Joe DioGuardi's proposal

Competition proposal 1 (2008)

Competition proposal 2 (2008)

Competition proposal 3 (2008)

Competition proposal 4 (2008

== Kuwait ==
1906 proposal

1913 proposal

== Kyrgyzstan ==
Proposal 1 (2011)

Proposal 2 (2011)

Proposal 3 (2011)

Proposal 4 (2011)

Proposal 5 (2011)

"Land of Celestial Mountains" proposal (2011)

Another proposal with a mountain in the flag (2011)

== Latvia* ==
Proposed 1:1:1 flag by painter Jānis Grosvalds intended for the Latvian Riflemen in their advance towards Jelgava (May 1917)

Proposed 1:1:1 flag by diplomat Oļģerts Grosvalds intended for the Latvian Riflemen (May 1917)

== Liberia ==
Proposed Flag of Liberia (1906)

== Lithuania ==
Flag used during the Vilnius Conference and a proposal for the flag of Lithuania (1917)

State flag proposal for Lithuania (May 1940)

State flag with the Columns of Gediminas proposal for Lithuania (May 1940)

Mstislav Dobuzhinsky's Proposal (1930-40s)

Mstislav Dobuzhinsky's Proposal (1930-40s)

Mstislav Dobuzhinsky's Proposal (1930-40s)

Mstislav Dobuzhinsky's Proposal (1930-40s)

Mstislav Dobuzhinsky's Proposal (1930-40s)

Mstislav Dobuzhinsky's Proposal (1930-40s)

== Luxembourg ==
Civil flag and ensign, proposed by CSV and ADR (2006)

== Malaysia ==
Proposal 1 (1949)

Proposal 2 (1949)

Proposal 3 (1949)

Proposal 4 (1949)

Proposal 5 (1949)

== Mexico ==
Original Imperial Flag Proposal (1821)

Teresa de Mier's Proposal (1823)

== Moldova ==
The Communist Party of the Republic of Moldova's proposal (2010)

Igor Dodon's proposal (2018)

== Montenegro ==
One of the proposals for redesign of the 1992 Montenegrin flag.

== Mozambique ==
In June 1932, while working for the Portuguese Institute of Heraldry (IPH), Affonso Dornellas elaborated a coat of arms for the Colony of Mozambique and João Ricardo da Silva drew it. Even though the Estado Novo's Agência Geral das Colónias (General Agency of the Colonies) had asked for the shield, it was never officially adopted. Like other designs, a modified version was used at the 1934 Colonial Exposition of Porto and on posterior coins before the introduction of the 1935 shield design.

In 1966, heraldist Franz Paul de Almeira Langhans designed flags for Portuguese ultramarine provinces in his book "Armorial do Ultramar Português", being Mozambique's the Flag of Portugal defaced with the colony's lesser arms shield on its lower fly side.

In 1990, the drafting of a new constitution started discussions on changing the national symbols due to their resemblance to those of the Mozambique Liberation Front (FRELIMO), as it would be antithetical to use a partidary flag for national unity. This move failed to change the flag, and since then the primary criticism has been directed at the inclusion of the AK-47 on it, which some Mozambicans view as an allusion to violence.

In 2005, the Mozambican government held a competition with five judges to choose a new national flag and emblem as part of a peace agreement between the FRELIMO and the Mozambican National Resistance (RENAMO). All the 169 proposals were ultimately rejected by the Assembly of the Republic, which voted 155 to 79 against changing the flag. All the votes against were from FRELIMO, and all the votes for were from RENAMO.

IPH's Colony of Mozambique flag proposal (1932)

Langhans' Overseas Province of Mozambique flag proposal (1966)

== Myanmar ==
Original Proposal (2006)

National League for Democracy Proposal (2019)

Shan Nationalities League for Democracy Proposal (2019)

Zomi Congress for Democracy Proposal (2019)

National United Democratic Party Proposal (2019)

== Namibia ==
Dr Wilhelm Solf's German South West Africa Proposal (1914)

== Nauru ==
"Distinguishing Flag" Proposal (1924)

== Nepal ==
Shree Shrestha's Proposal (2009)

== Netherlands ==
=== Aruba ===
Aruba is one of the islands that formed the former territory of the Netherlands Antilles. In 1976, the decision to obtain a distinctive flag was made, so a committee was formed in order to decide in what the design of such as flag would be. From the 693 proposals that were made to the committee, a preliminary selection of 157 was carried out. Some of these designs are depicted below. Some other proposals were made by vexillologists such as Whitney Smith, who proposed two designs.

Eventually, the committee worked on W.J. Fransen's design, and after a few iterations, the current flag of Aruba was born.

Sample proposal 1 (1976)

Sample proposal 2 (1976)

Sample proposal 3 (1976)

Sample proposal 4 (1976)

Sample proposal 5 (1976)

Sample proposal 6 (1976)

Sample proposal 7 (1976)

Sample proposal 8 (1976)

Sample proposal 9 (1976)

Rosendo Feliciano's proposal (1976)

J.W. Klein's proposal (1976)

W.J. Fransen's proposal (1976)

Whitney Smith's proposal 1 (1976)

Whitney Smith's proposal 2 (1976)

=== Sint Maarten ===
St. Martin Unity Flag (1990)

== New Zealand ==
See "2015–2016 New Zealand flag referendums" and "New Zealand flag debate"

"Flag of the United Tribes of New Zealand" by James Busby (1834)

Clark Titman's Proposal (1967)

D.A. Bale's Proposal (e.1980s)

"Koru Flag" by Friedensreich Hundertwasser (1983)

"Black and Silver" by John Ansell, Kenneth Wang, and Grant McLachlan (1986 & 2015)

Aaron Nicholson's Proposal (1987)

James Dignan's Proposal (2002)

Helen Clark's Proposal (2007)

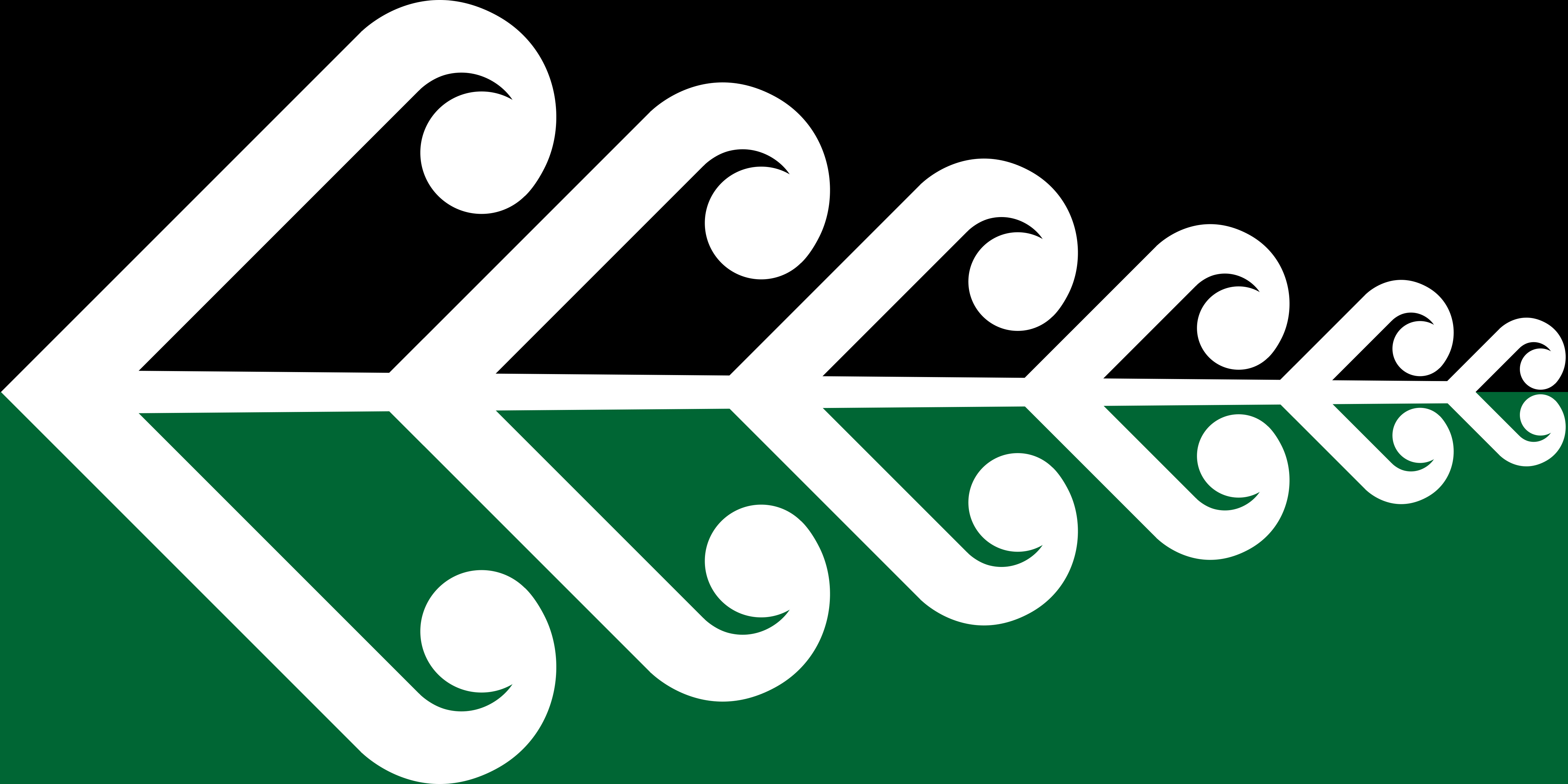
"Koru Fern" by James Bowman (2015)

"Wā Kāinga" by Studio Alexander (2015)

"Land Of The Long White Cloud" (Ocean Blue) by Mike Archer (2015)

"Land Of The Long White Cloud" (Traditional Blue) by Mike Archer (2016)

"Huihui" by Sven Baker (2015)

"Silver Fern" (Black & Silver) by Sven Baker (2015)

"Southern Cross Horizon" by Sven Baker (2015)

"Southern Koru" by Sven Baker (2015)

"Unity Koru" (Red & Blue) by Sven Baker

"Inclusive" by Dominic Carroll (2015)

"Moving Forward" by Dominic Carroll (2015)

"The Seven Stars of Matariki" by Matthew Clare (2015)

"Silver Fern" (Green) by Roger Clarke (2015)

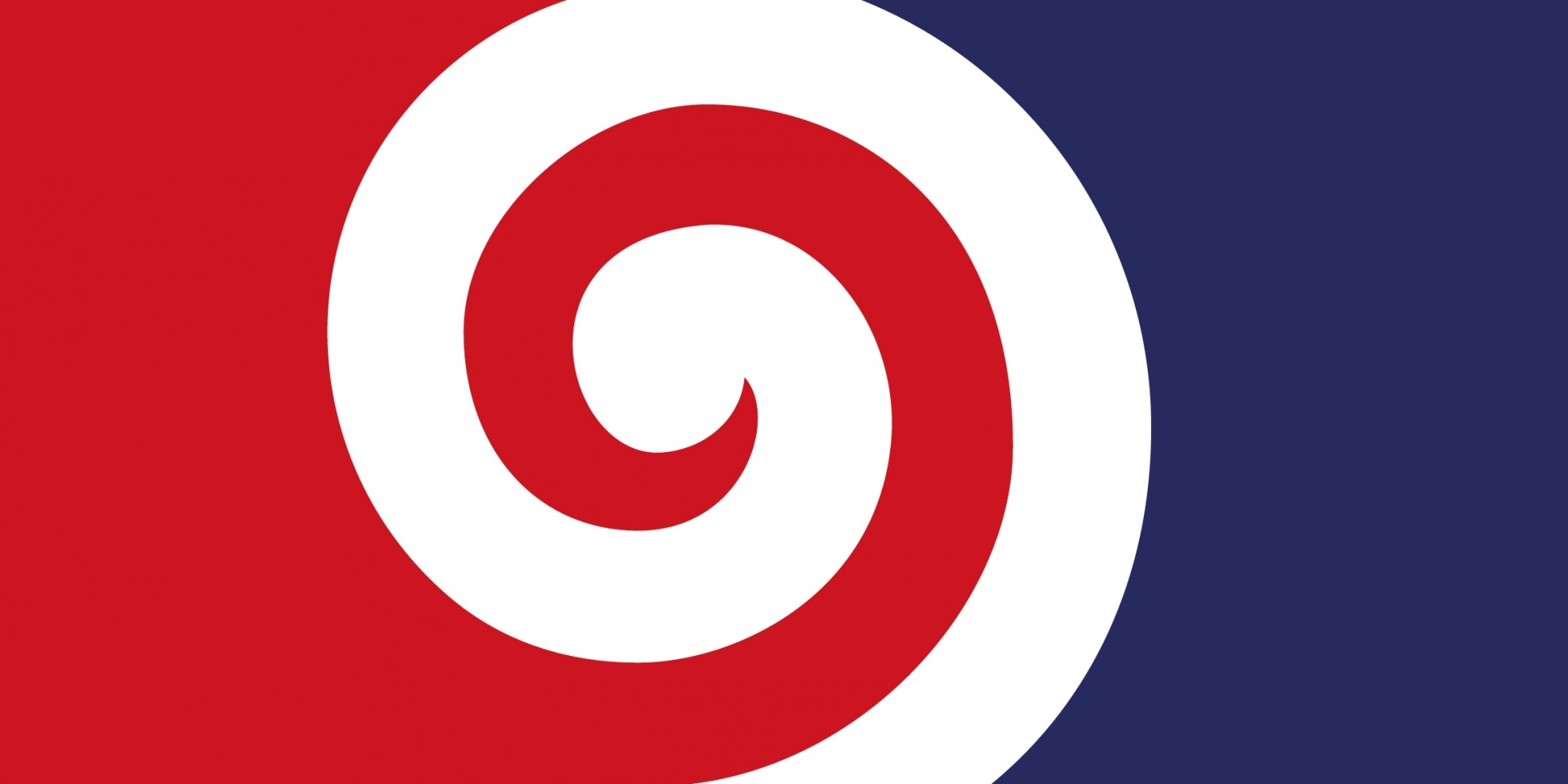
"Curly Koru" by Daniel Crayford & Leon Cayford (2015)

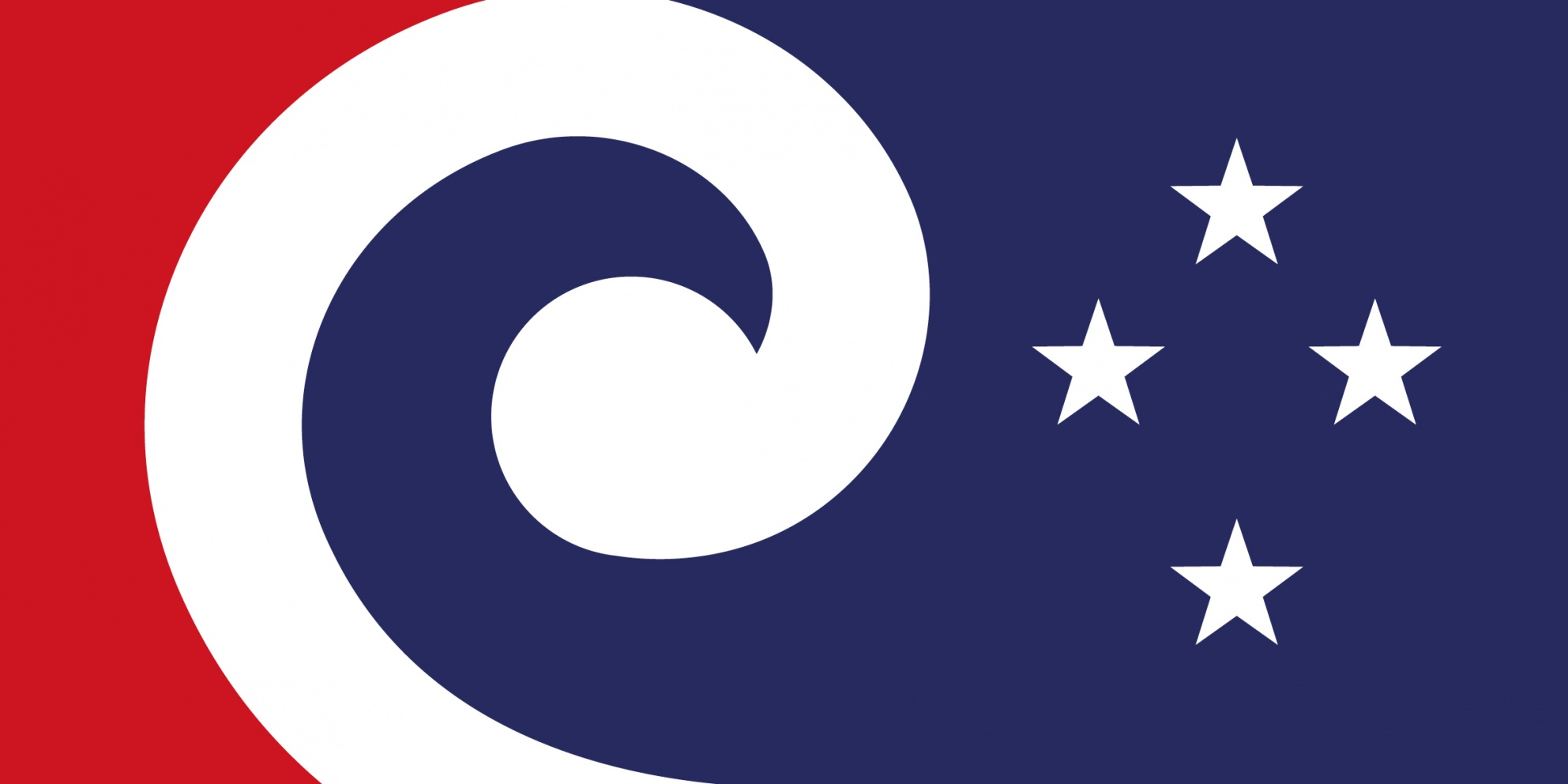
"Koru Fin" by Daniel Crayford & Leon Cayford (2015)

"Modern Hundertwasser" by Tomas Cottle (2015)

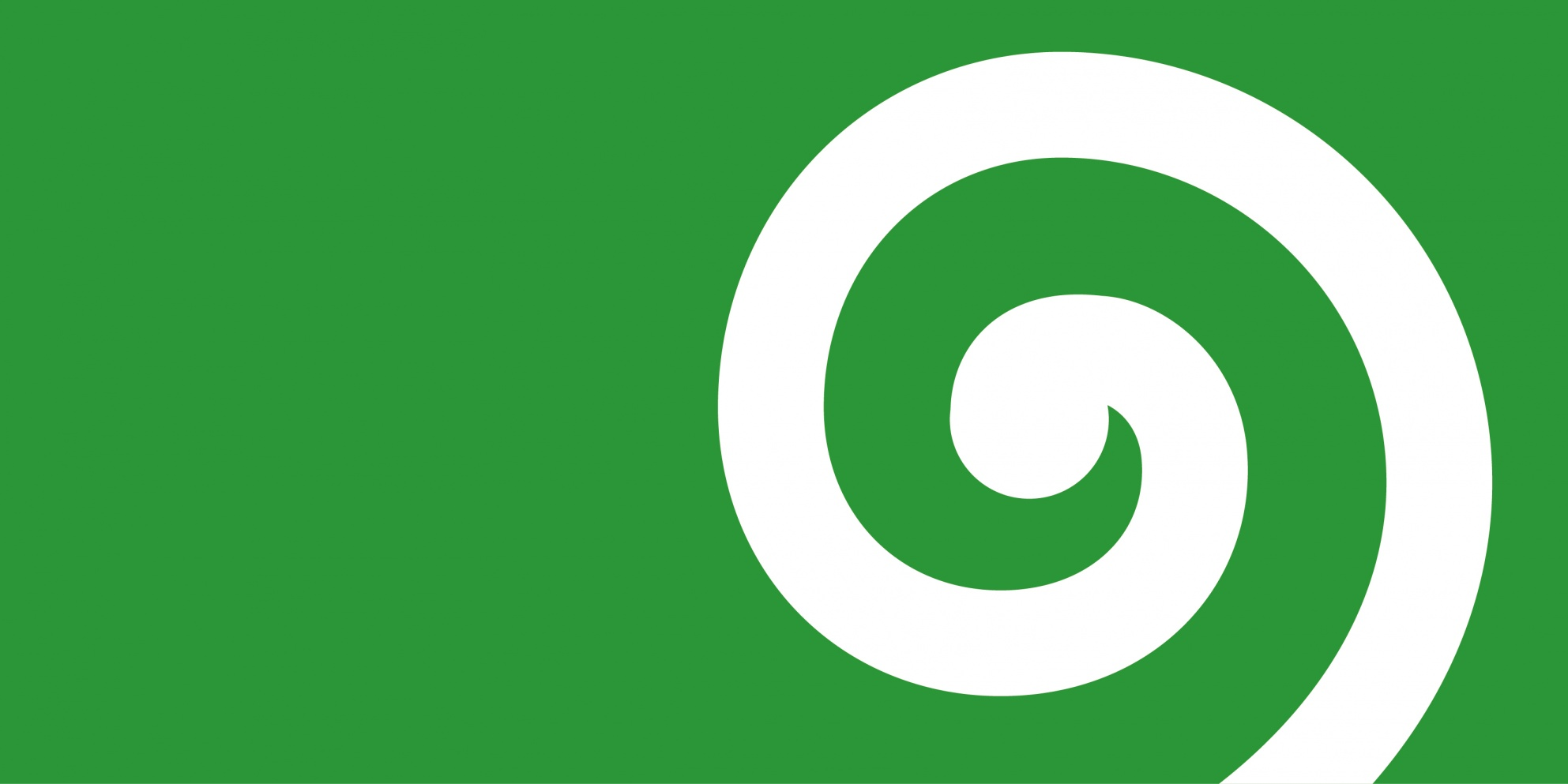
"NZ One" by Travis Cunningham (2015)

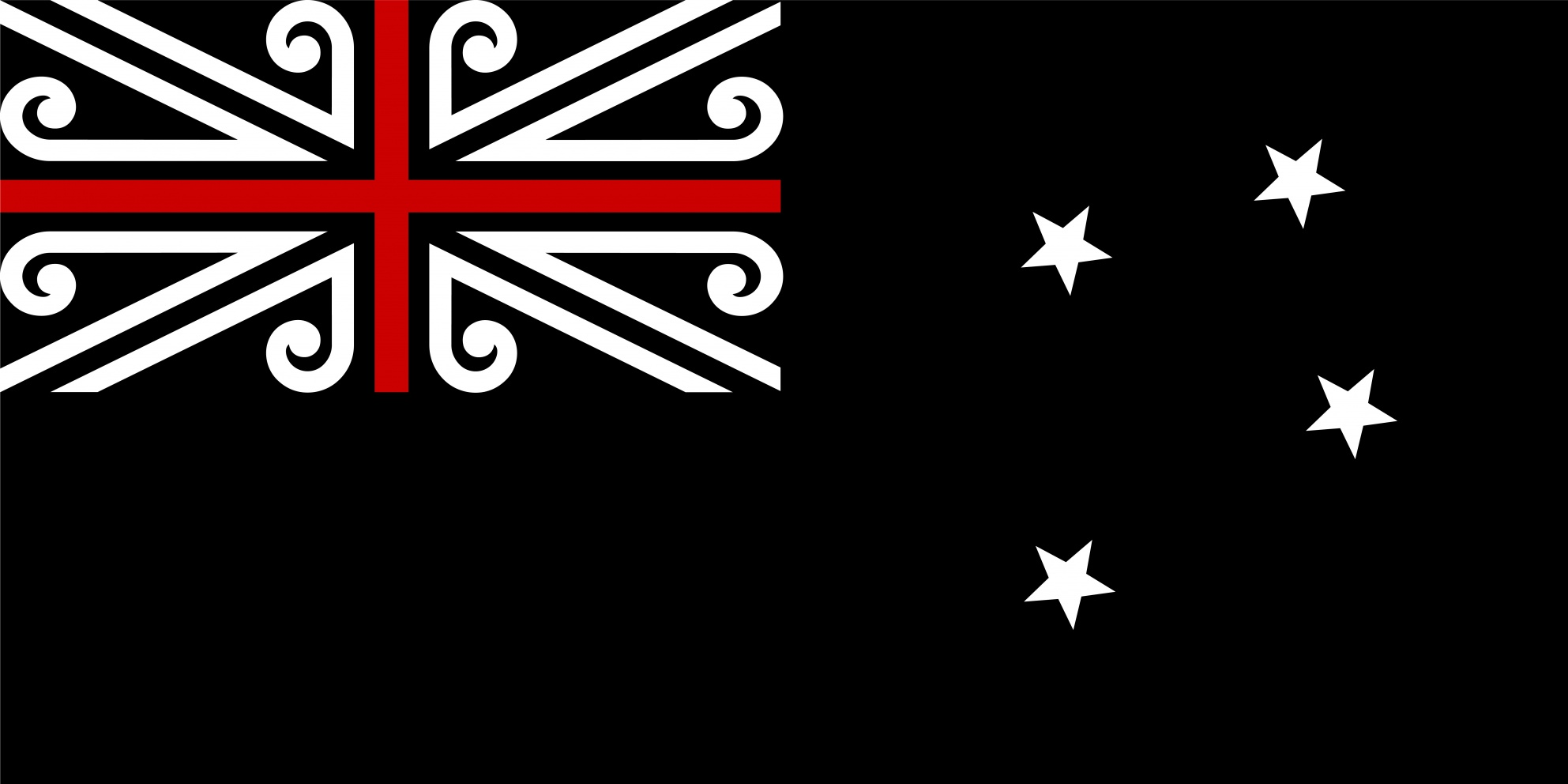
"Black Jack" by Mike Davison (2015)

"Unity Koru" by Paul Densem (2015)

"New Southern Cross" by Wayne William Doyle (2015)

"Red Peak" by Aaron Dustin (2015)

"Manawa" (Black & Green) by Otis Frizzell (2015)

"Manawa" (Blue & Green) by Otis Frizzell (2015)

"Embrace" (Red & Blue) by Denise Fung (2015)

"Koru" (Black) by Andrew Fyfe (2015)

"Koru" (Blue) by Andrew Fyfe (2015)

"Unity Fern" (Red & Blue) by Paul Jackways (2015)

"White & Black Fern" by Alofi Kanter (2015)

"New Zealand Matariki" by John Kelleher (2015)

"Silver Fern" (Black with Red Stars) by Kyle Lockwood (2015)

"Silver Fern" (Red, White & Blue) by Kyle Lockwood (2015)

"Silver Fern" (Black & White) by Kyle Lockwood (2015)

"Silver Fern" (Black, White & Red) by Kyle Lockwood (2015)

"Silver Fern" (Black, White & Blue) by Kyle Lockwood (2015)

"Pikopiko" by Grant Pascoe (2015)

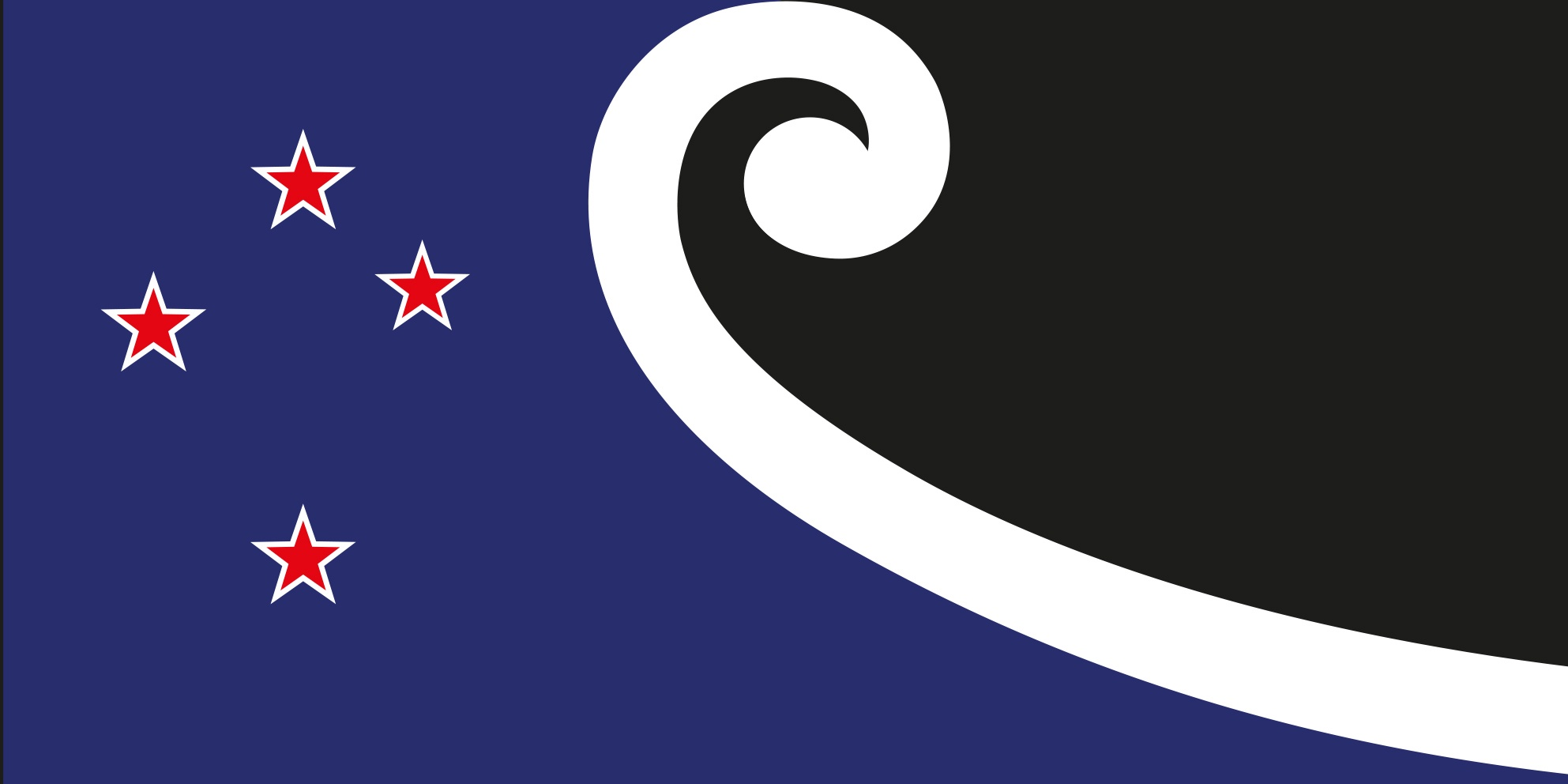
"Finding Unity in Community" by Dave Sauvage (2015)

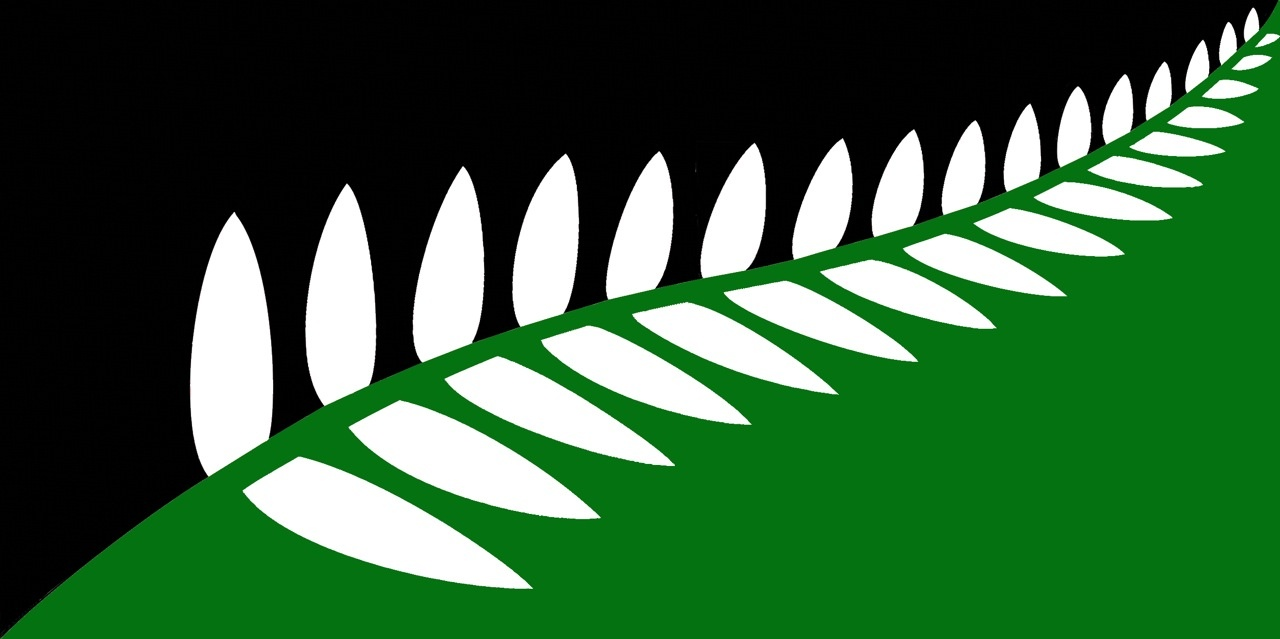
"Fern" (Green, Black & White) by Clay Sinclair & Sandra Ellmers (2015)

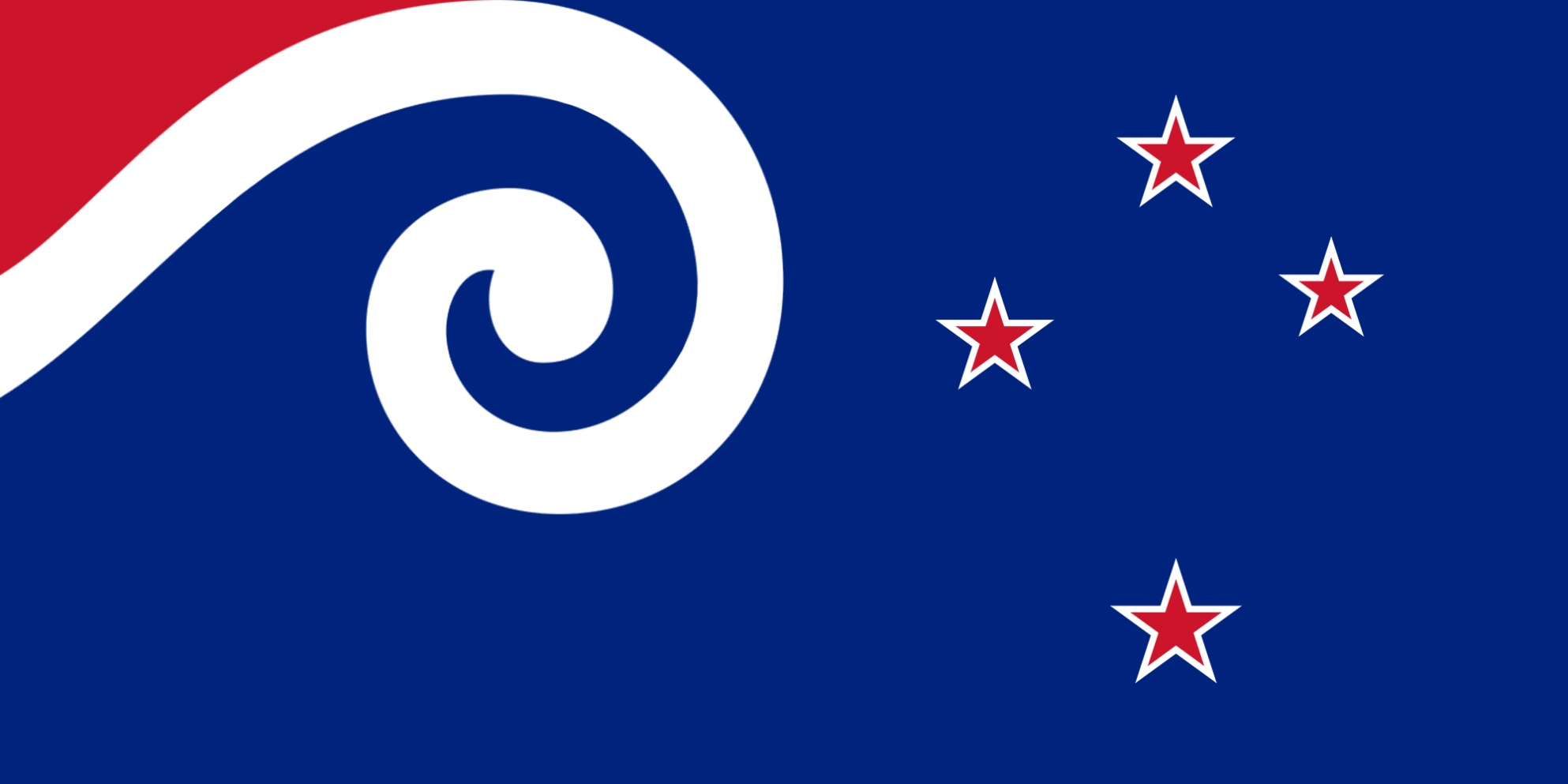
"Koru and Stars" by Alan Tran (2015)

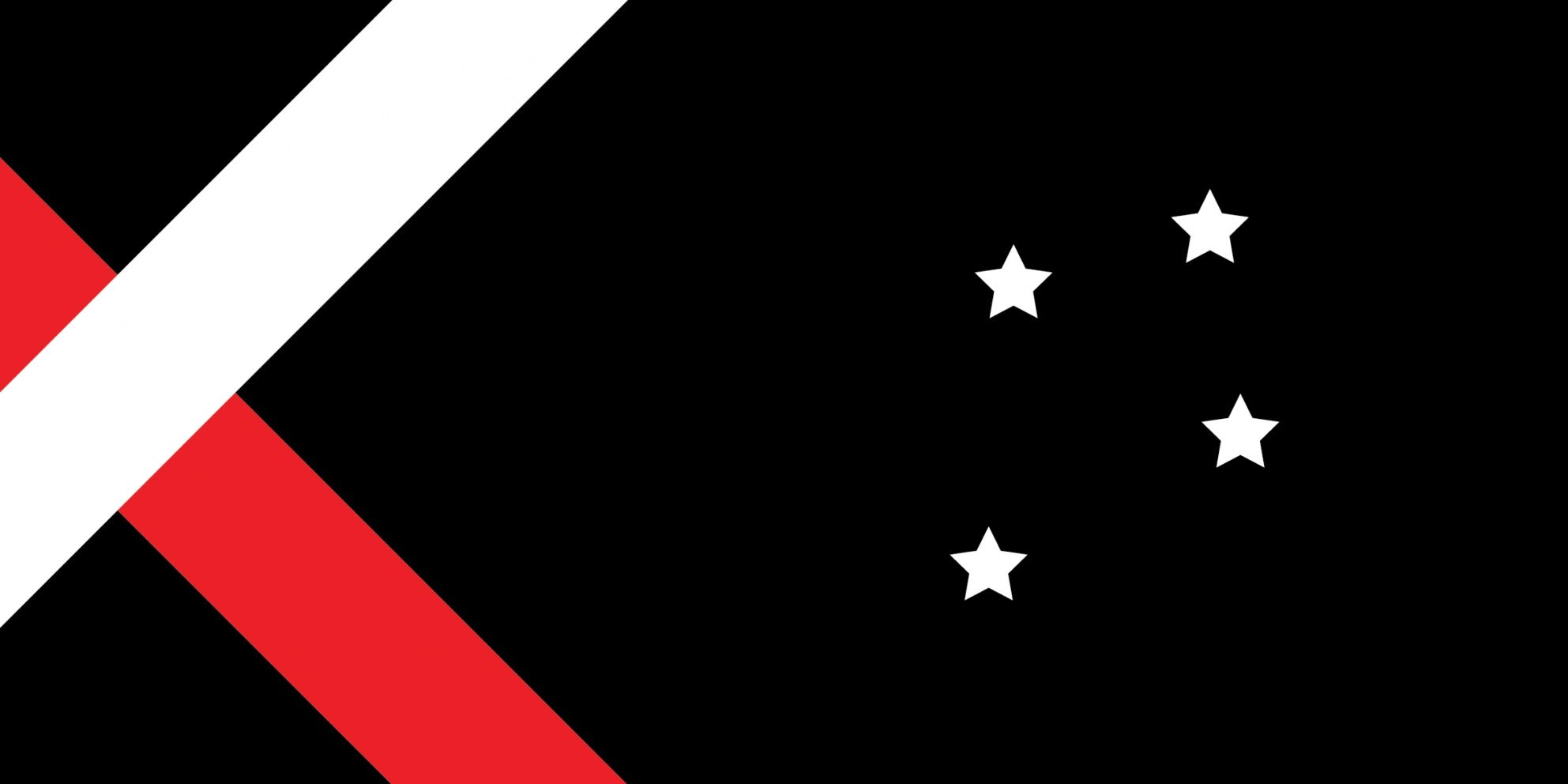
"Raranga" by Pax Zwanikken (2015)

"Tukutuku" by Pax Zwanikken (2015)

=== Chatham Islands ===
Unofficial Flag of Chatham Islands by Logan Anderson (1989)

=== Cook Islands ===
Len Staples' Proposal (1973)

=== Ross Dependency ===
Unofficial Flag of Ross Dependency by James Dignan (1995)

=== Tokelau ===
1980s proposal

2007 proposal

== Nigeria ==
Michael Taiwo Akinkunmi's original proposal (1958)

== North Korea (DPRK) ==
Kim Tu Bong's Proposal 1 (1948)

Kim Tu Bong's Proposal 2 (1948)

== North Macedonia* ==
Proposal 1 (1995)

Proposal 2 (1995)

Proposal 3 (1995)

Proposal 4 (1995)

Proposal 5 (1995)

Proposal 6 (1995)

Proposal 7 (1995)

Proposal 8 (1995)

Proposal 9 (1995)

Original Proposal (1995)

== Norway ==
Alternative proposal by Christian Frederick (1814)

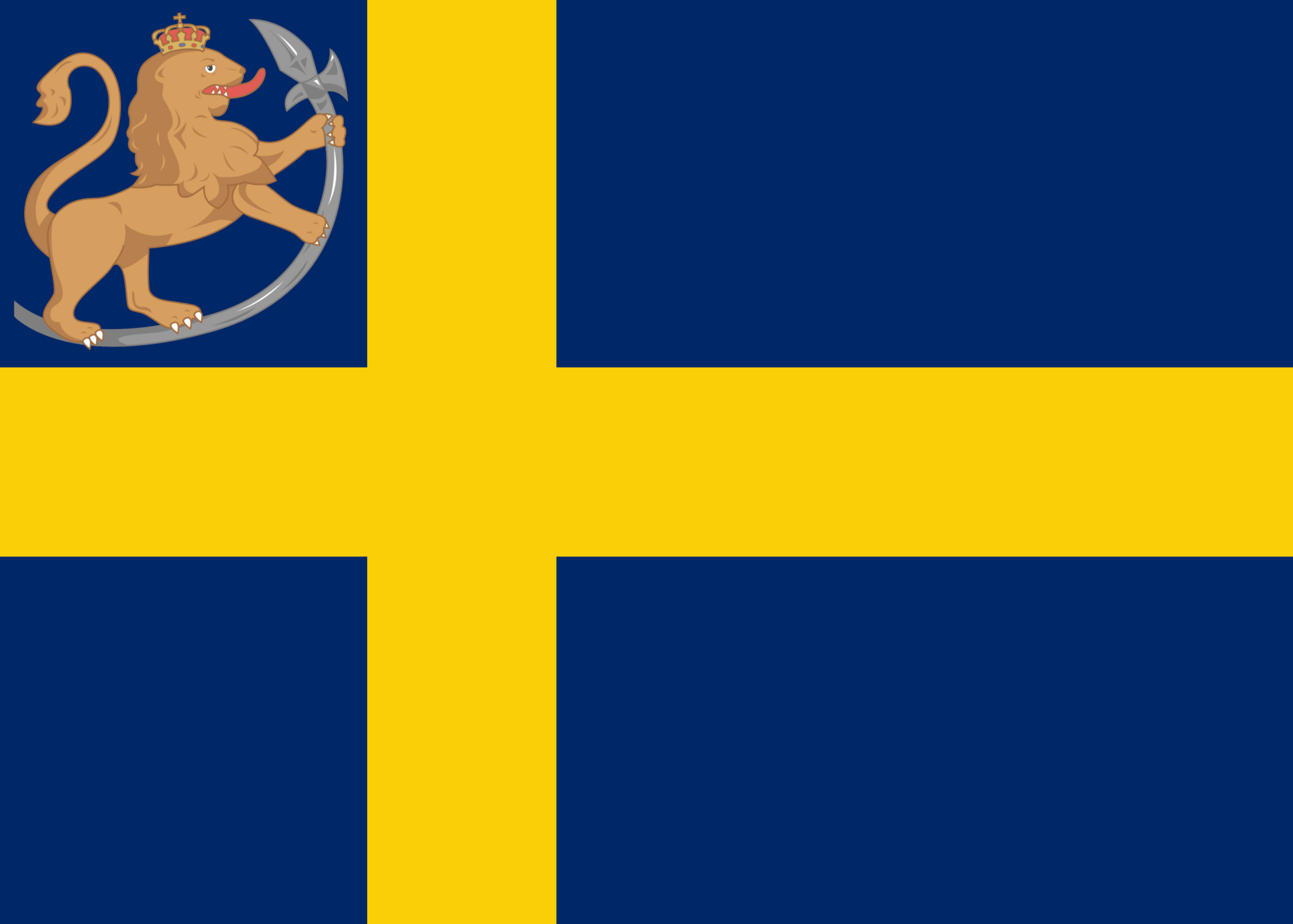
Swedish proposal for merchant flag (1814)

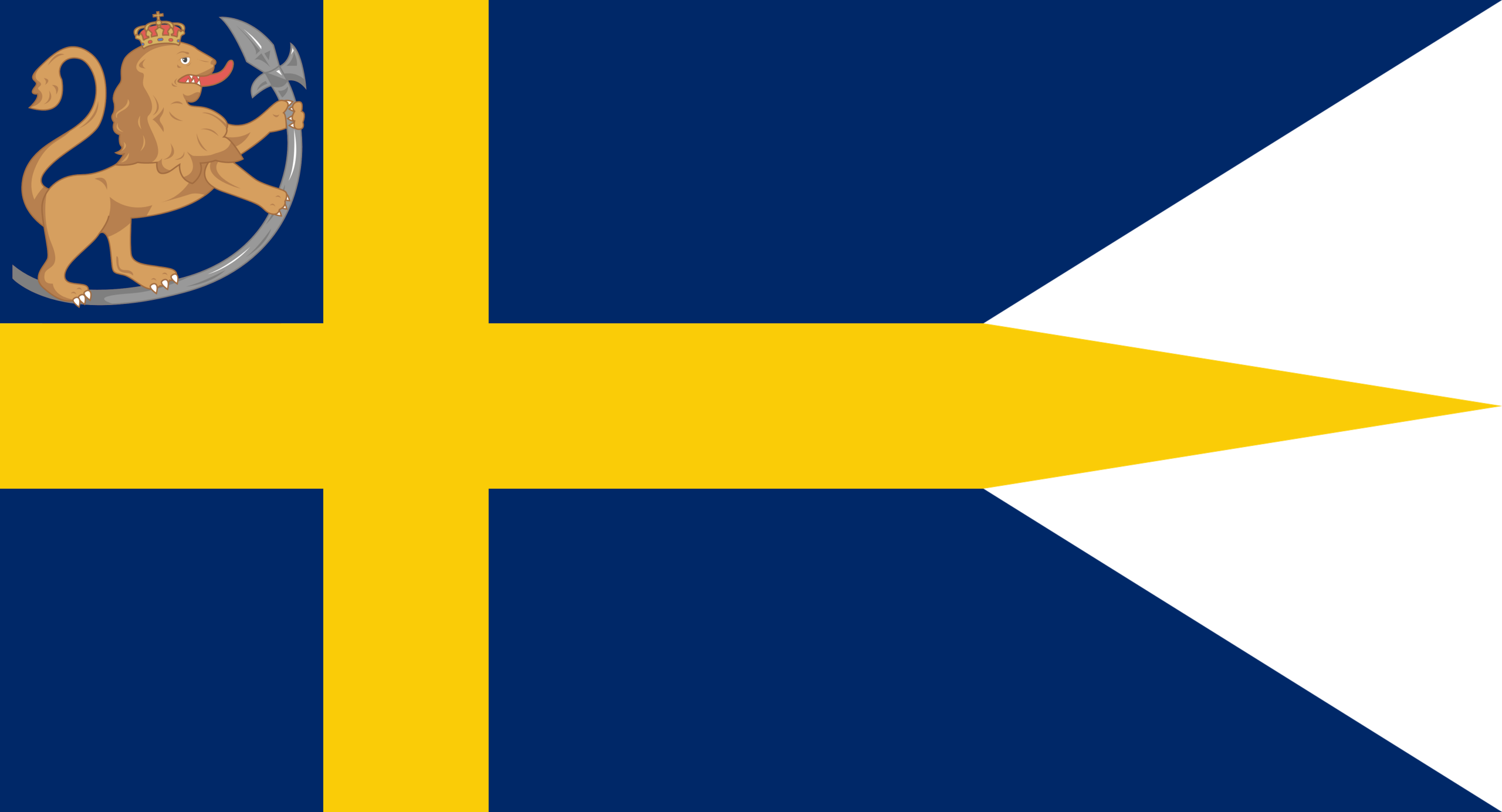
Swedish proposal for state flag (1814)

Anonymous october proposal 1: sketch 1 (1814)

Anonymous october proposal 1: sketch 2 (1814)

Anonymous october proposal 1: sketch 3 (1814)

Anonymous october proposal 1: sketch 4 (1814)

Anonymous october proposal 1: sketch 5 (1814)

Anonymous october proposal 1: sketch 6 (1814)

Anonymous october proposal 1: sketch 7 (1814)

Anonymous october proposal 1: sketch 8 (1814)

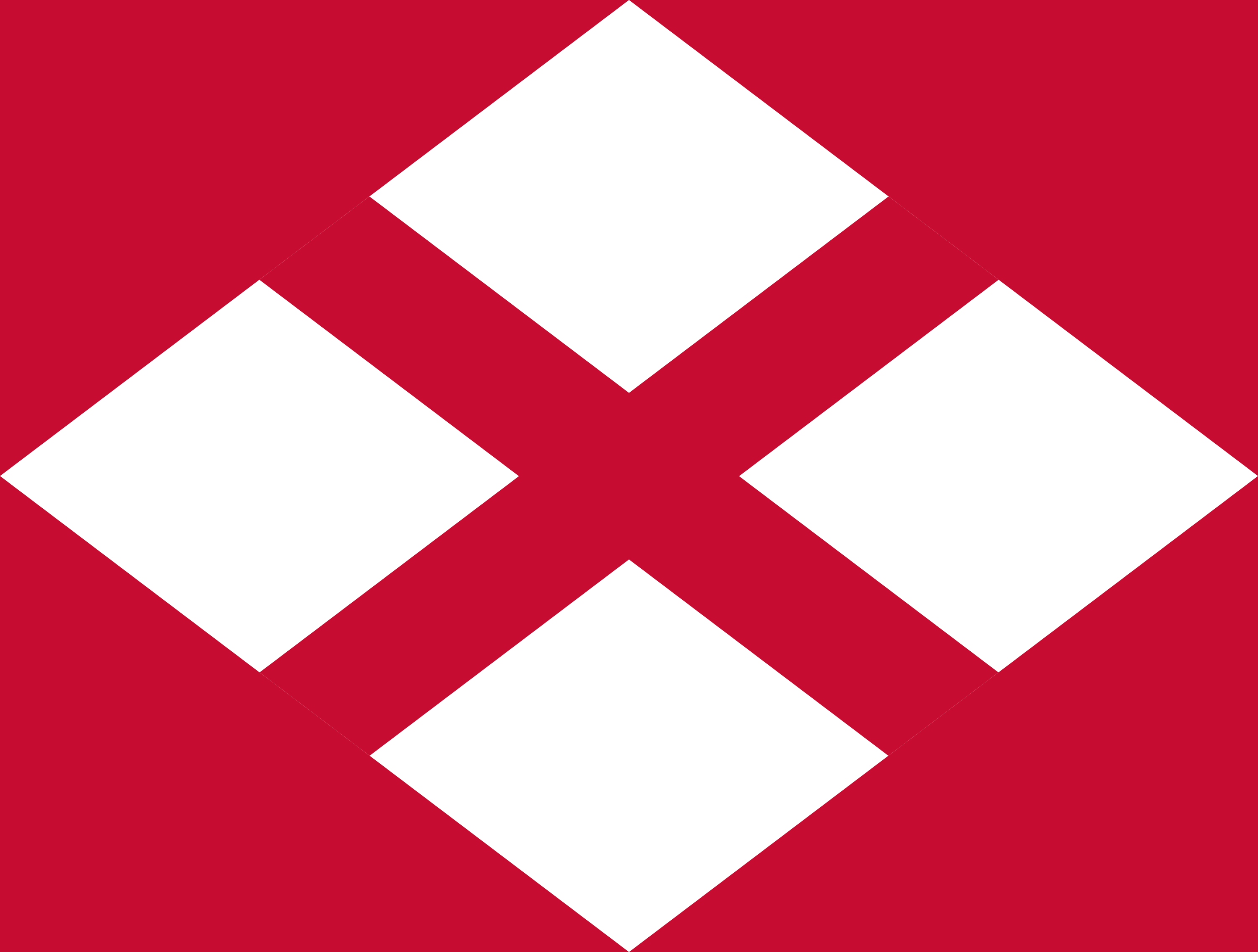
Anonymous october proposal 1: sketch 9 (1814)

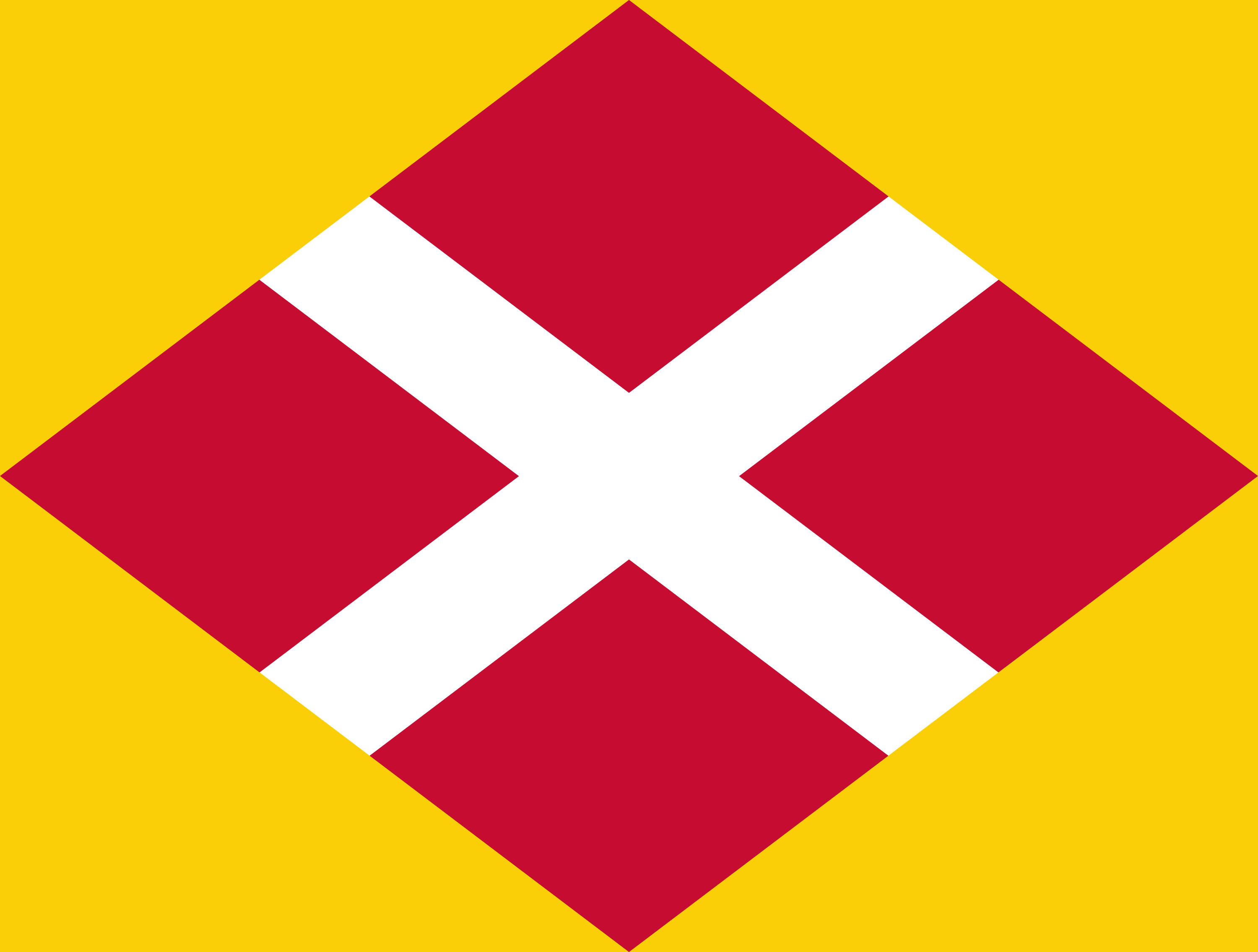
Anonymous october proposal 1: sketch 10 (1814)

Anonymous october proposal 1: sketch 11 (1814)

Anonymous october proposal 1: sketch 12 (1814)

Anonymous october proposal 1: sketch 13 (1814)

Anonymous october proposal 1: sketch 14 (1814)

Anonymous october proposal 1: sketch 15 (1814)

Anonymous october proposal 1: sketch 16 (1814)

Anonymous october proposal 1: sketch 17 (1814)

Anonymous october proposal 1: sketch 18 (1814)

Anonymous october proposal 1: sketch 19 (1814)

Anonymous october proposal 1: sketch 20 (1814)

Anonymous october proposal 1: sketch 21 (1814)

Anonymous october proposal 1: sketch 22 (1814)

Anonymous october proposal 1: sketch 23 (1814)

Anonymous october proposal 1: sketch 24 (1814)

Anonymous october proposal 2: sketch 1 (1814)

Anonymous october proposal 2: sketch 2 (1814)

Anonymous october proposal 2: sketch 3 (1814)

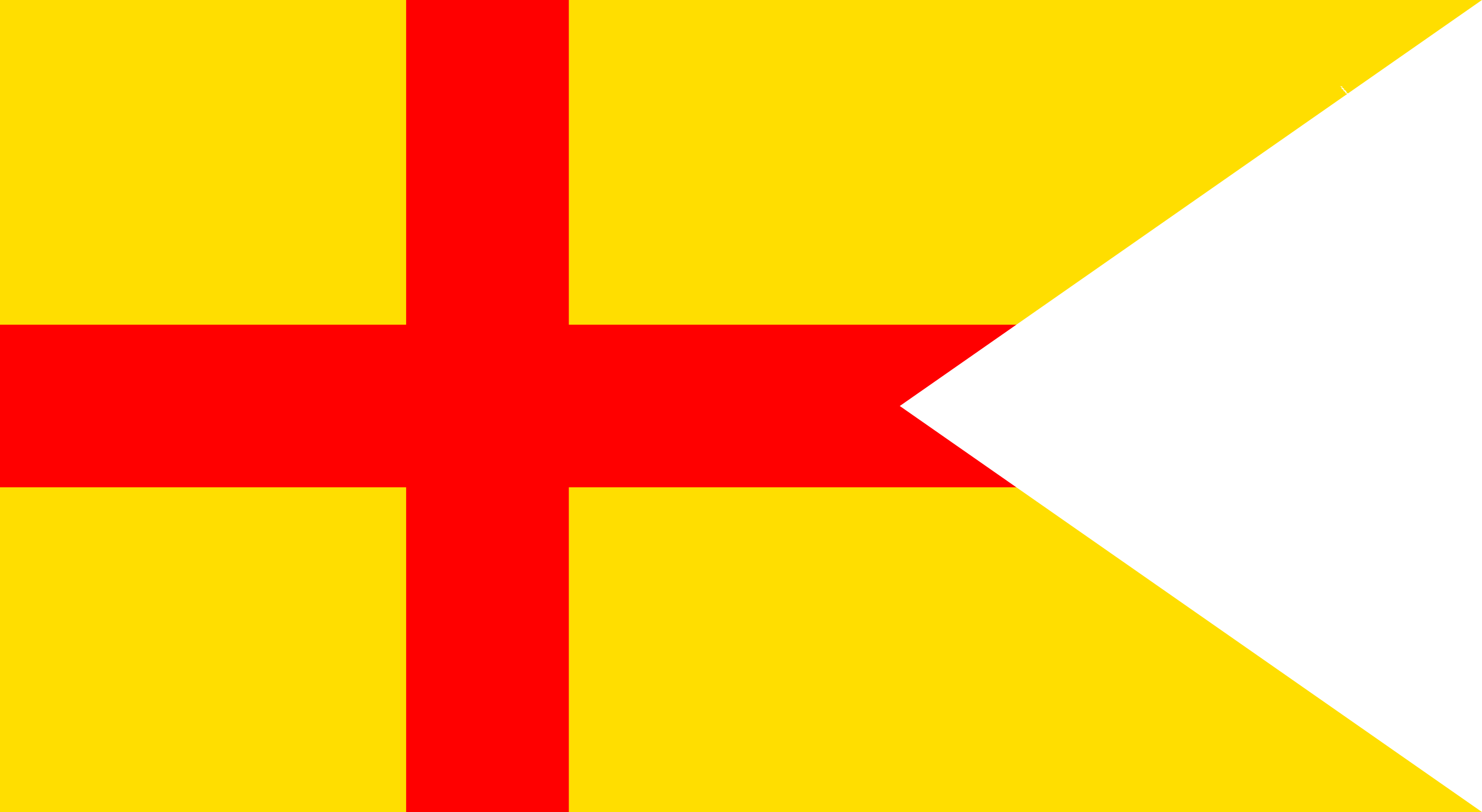
Anonymous october proposal 2: sketch 4 (1814)

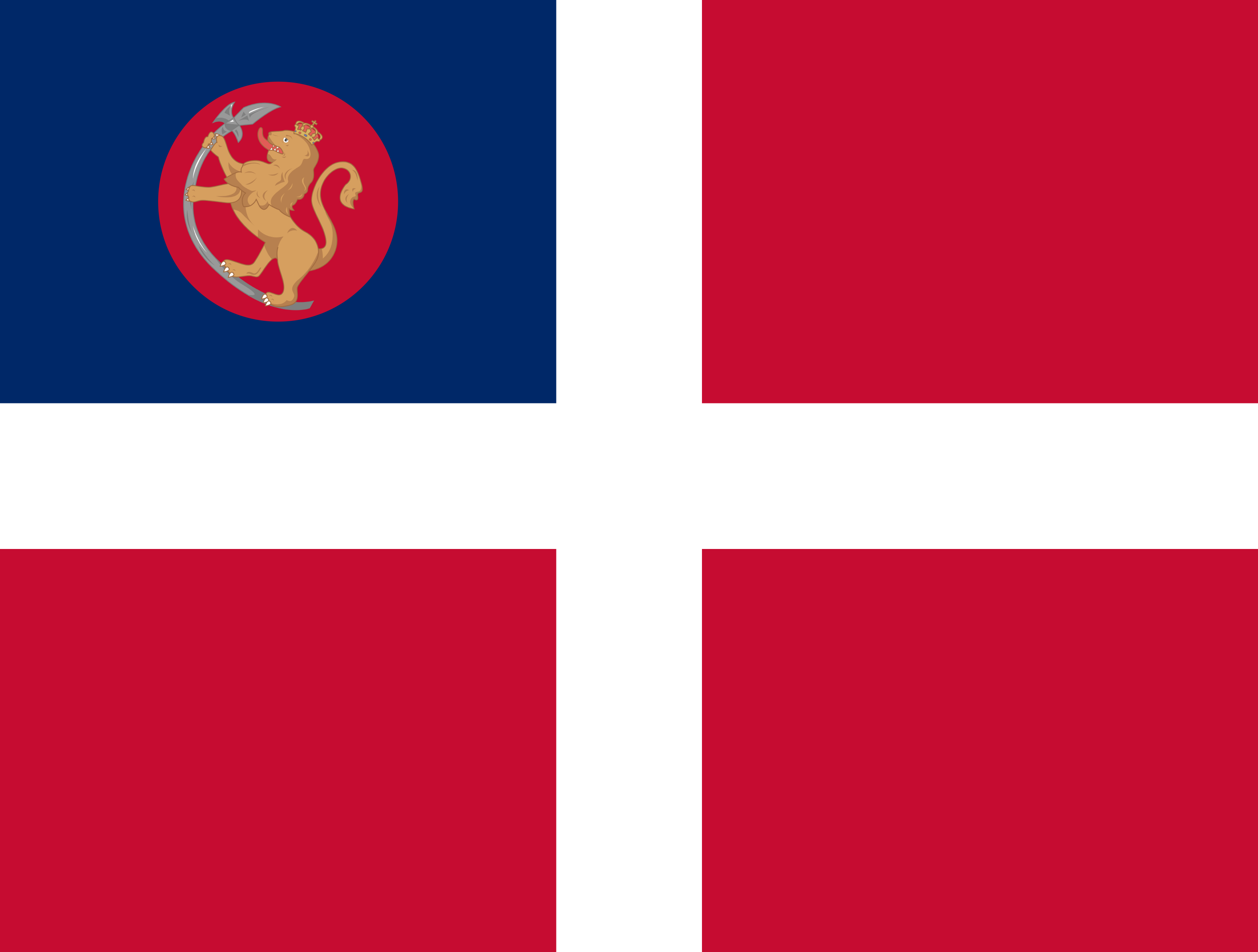
Proposal 1 by Gregers Lundh (1814)

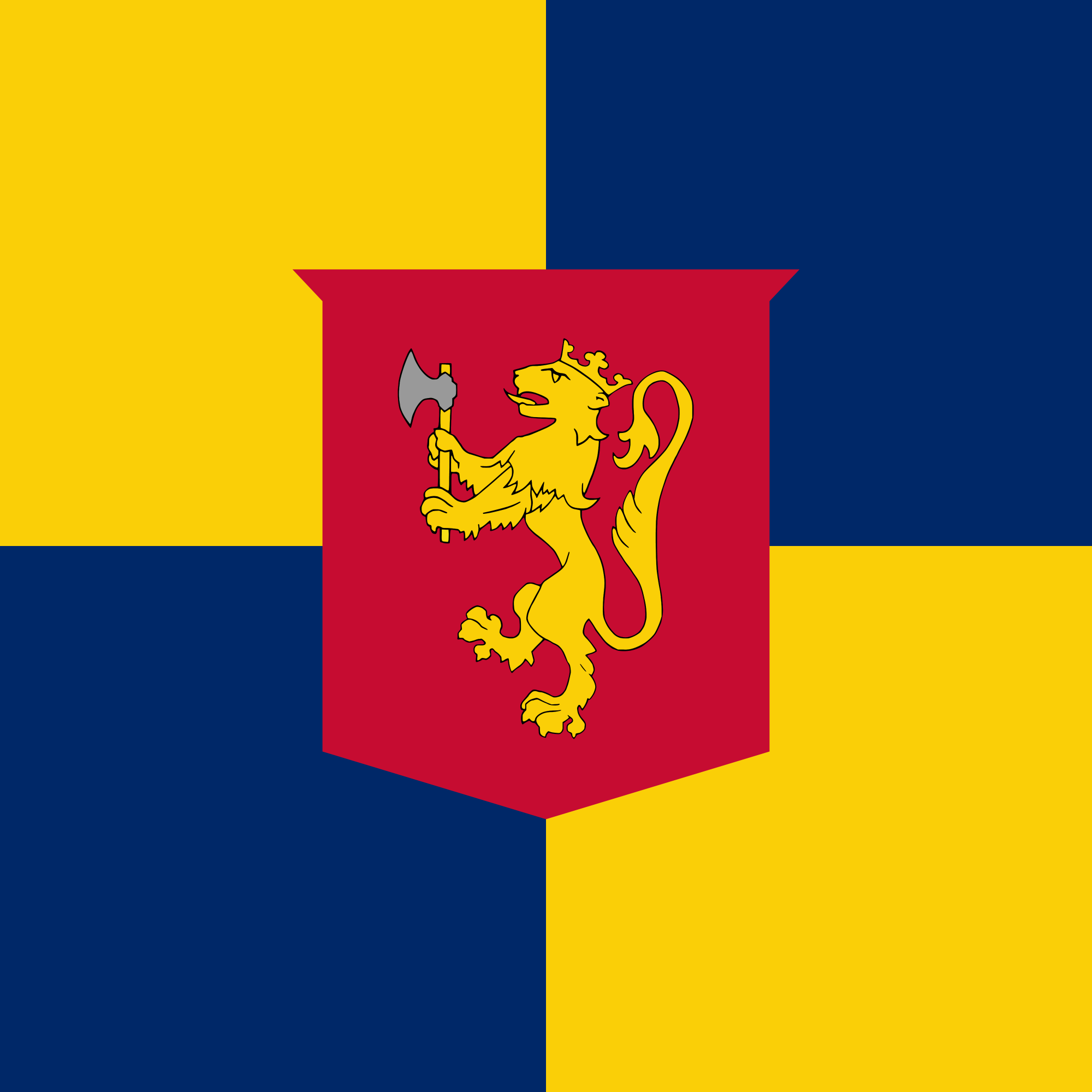
Proposal 2 by Gregers Lundh (1814)

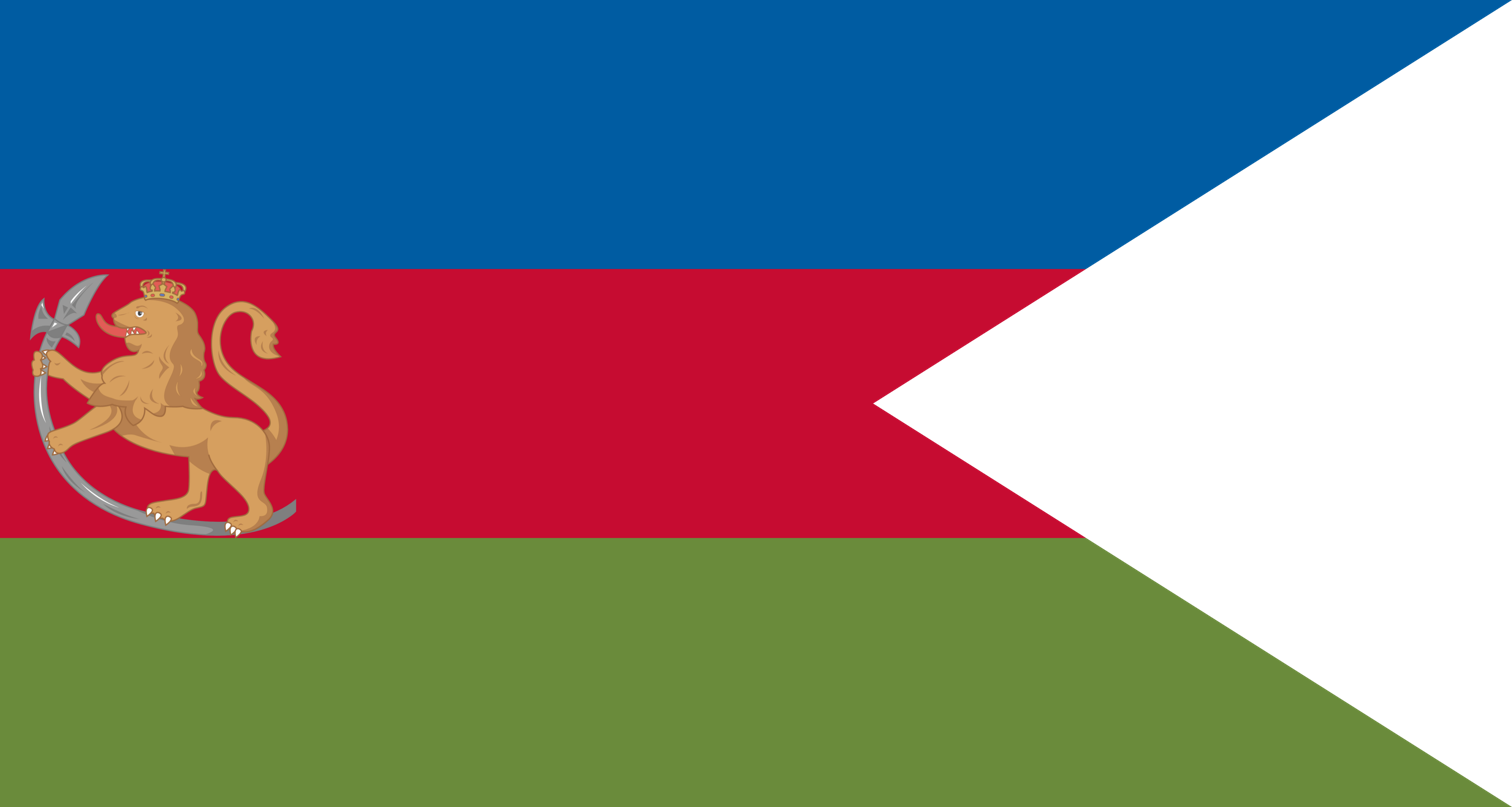
Proposal by [Svend Busch Brun (1814)

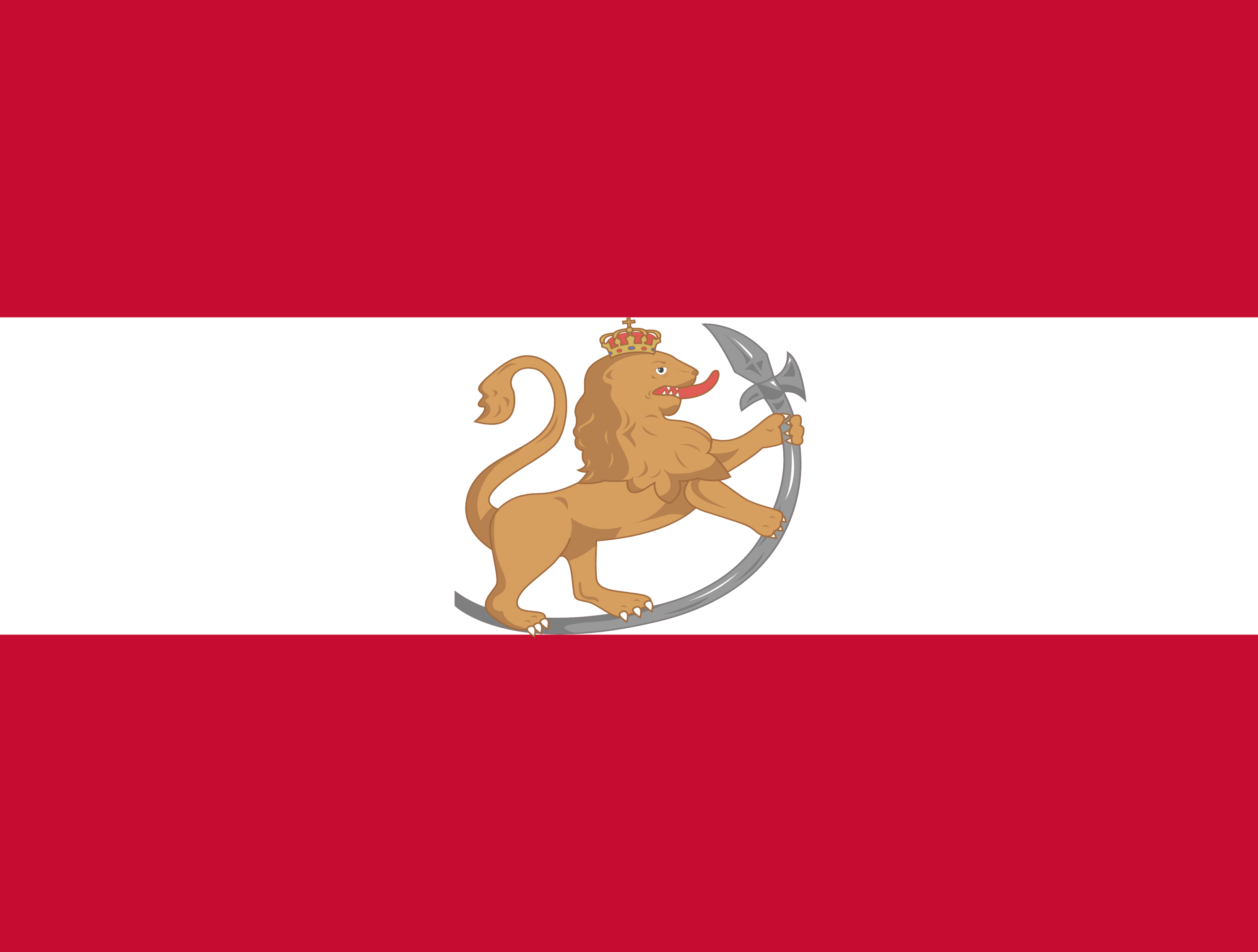
Proposal by Peder Jacobsen Bøgvald (1815)

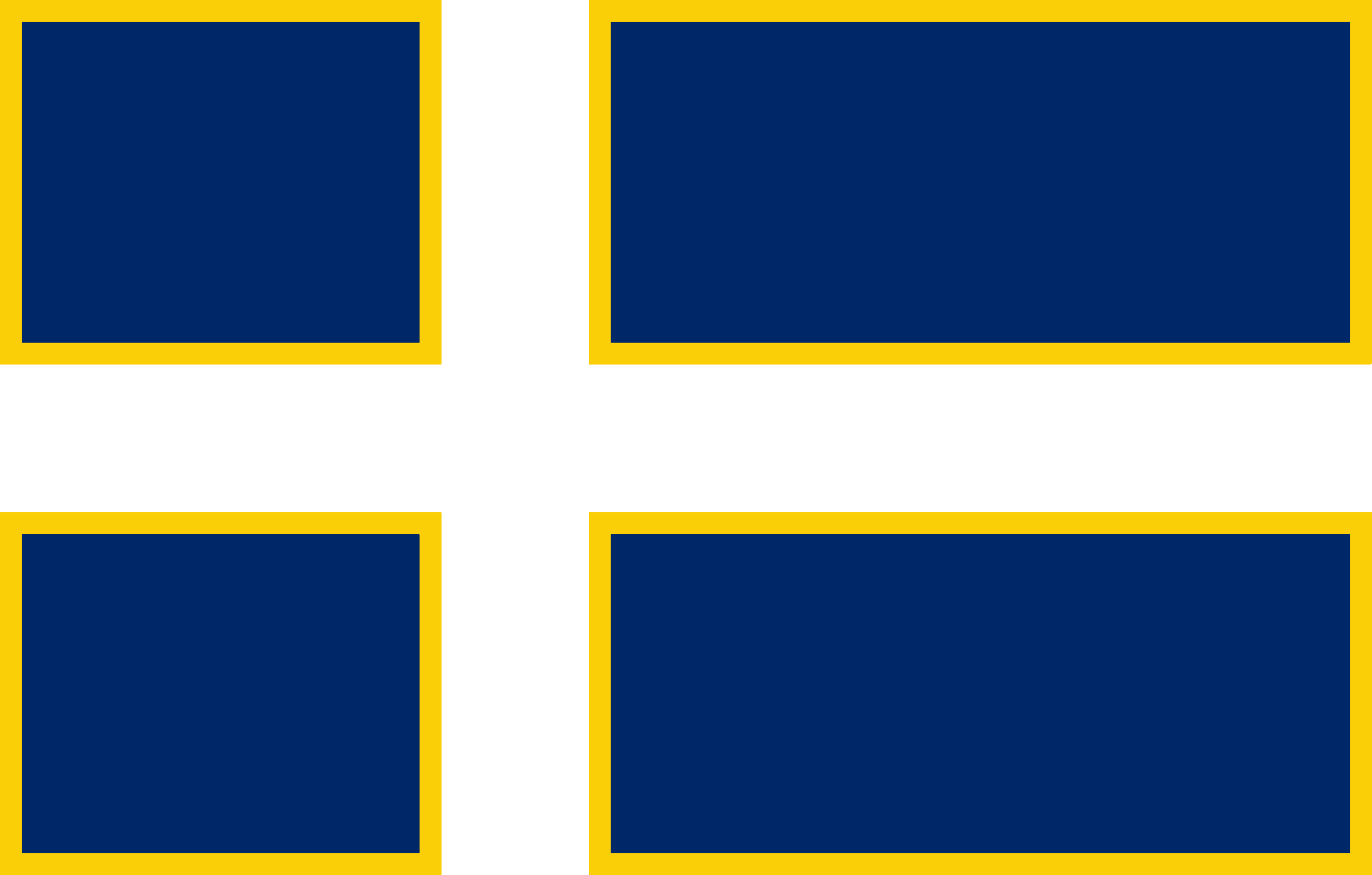
Proposal by Niels Aall (1815)

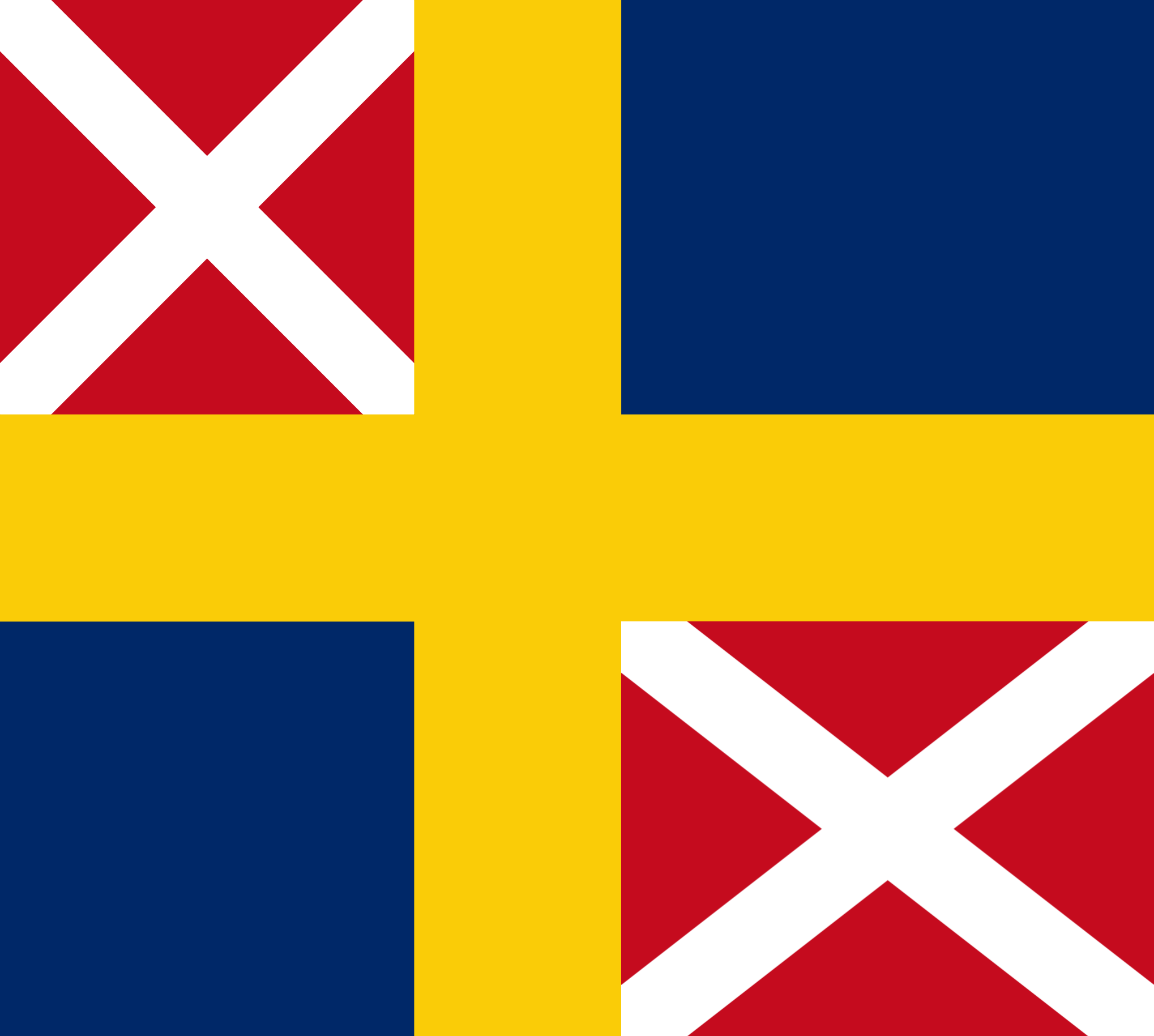
Proposal by the Storting Flag committee (1815)

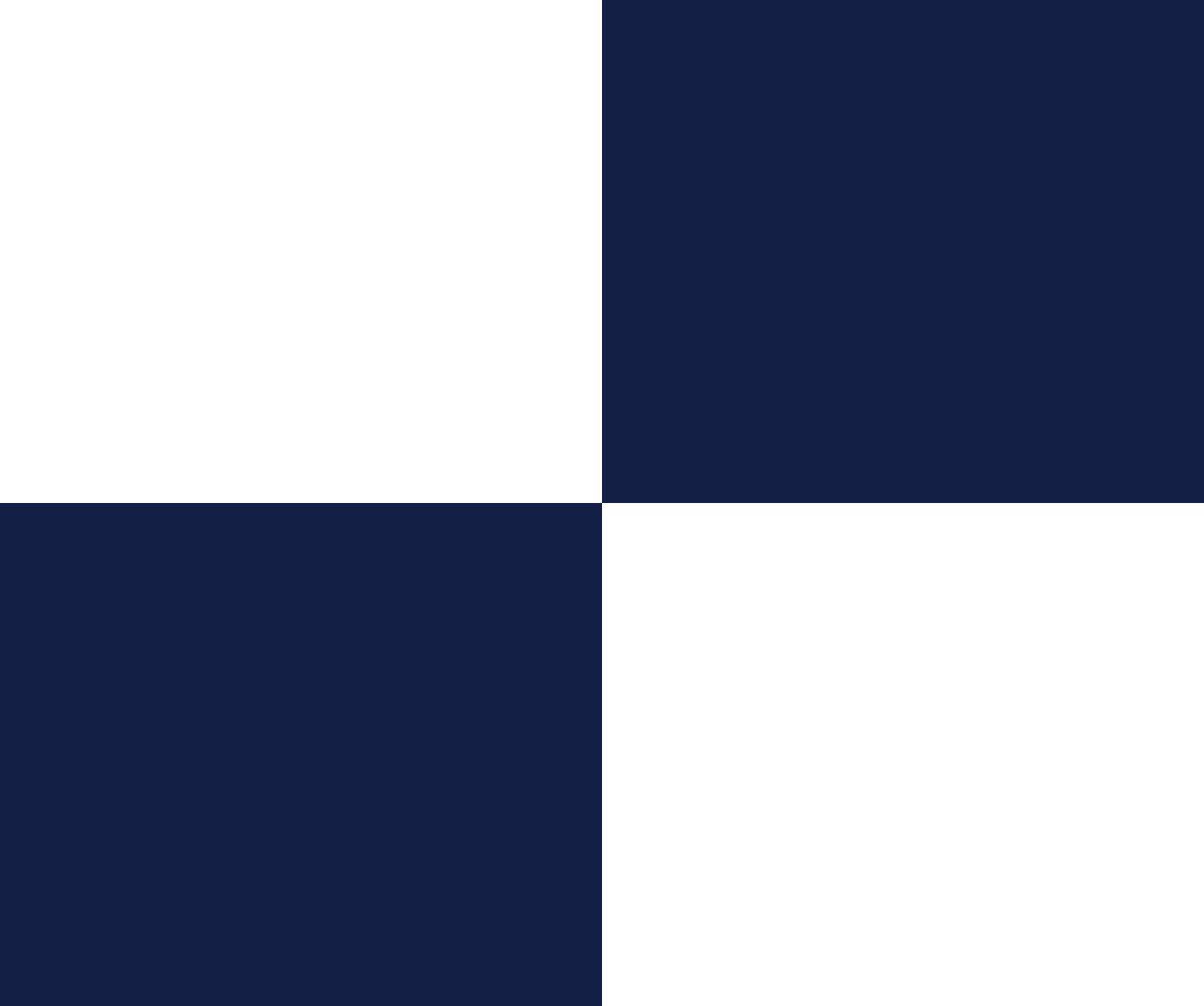
Proposal by Gabriel Schanche Kielland (1820)

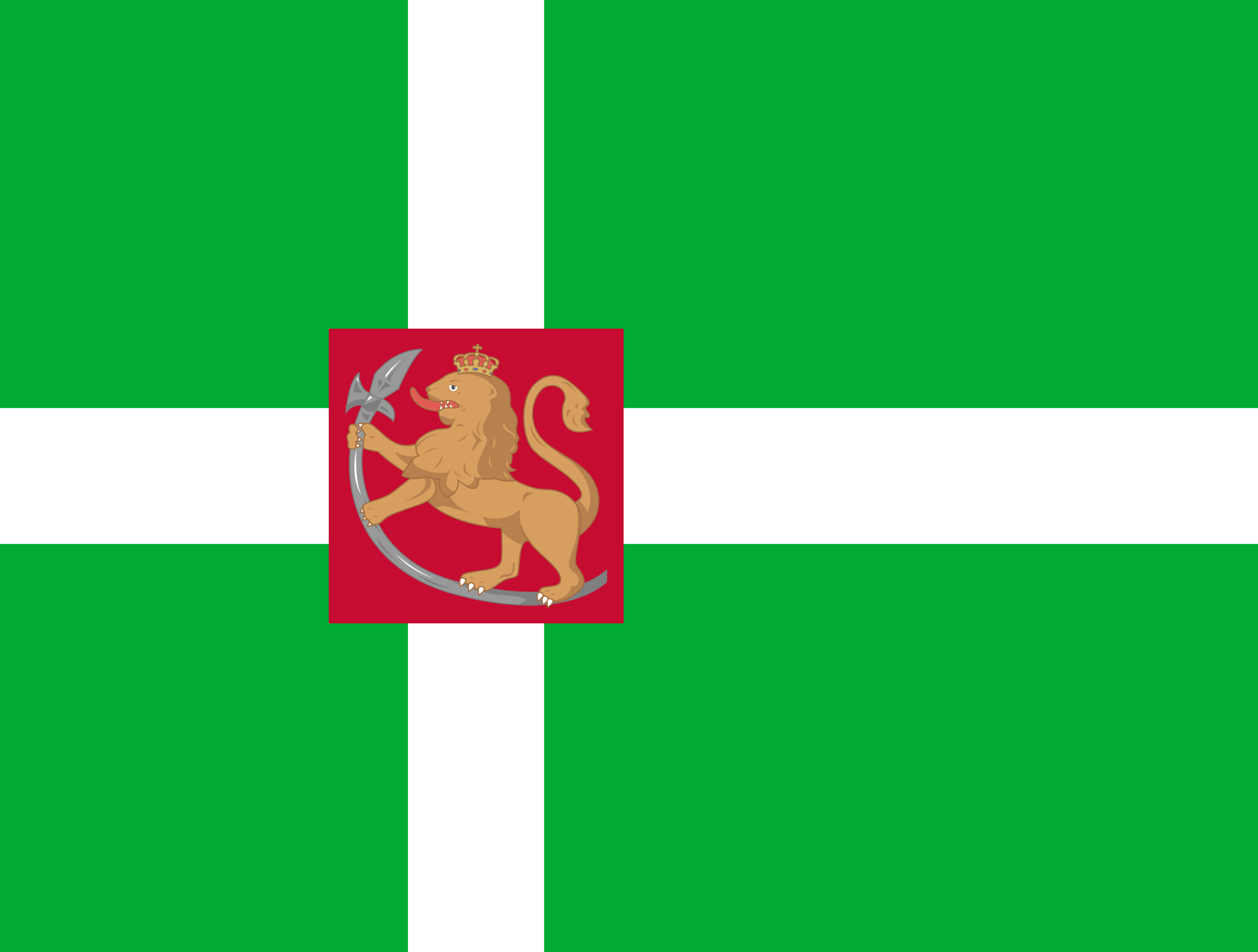
Proposal by Jan Rasmussen Sande (1821)

Proposal 1 by the Storting flag committee (1821)

Proposal 2 by Fredrik Meltzer (1821)

Proposal 6 (1821)

Proposal 7 (1821)

Proposal 8 by Christian Magnus Falsen (1821)

Proposal 10 (1821)

Proposal 11 (A) by the Commission of Bergen (1821)

Proposal 11 (B) by the Commission of Bergen (1821)

Proposal 11 (C) by the Commission of Bergen (1821)

Proposal 12 by Citizens in Grimstad (1821)

Proposal 13 by Poul Holst (1821)

Proposal 14 by Andreas Martin Seip (1821)

Proposal 15 by Christian Magnus Falsen (1821)

Proposal 16 by Citizens in Tønsberg (1821)

Proposal 18 (1821)

Secular proposal by Ådne Løvstad (2014)

Secular proposal by Ådne Løvstad (2014)

Secular proposal by Ådne Løvstad (2014)

=== Svalbard ===
Proposed flag of Svalbard (1930)

== Other supranational flag proposals ==
=== British Empire ===
British Empire flag (1910)

British Empire flag (1930)

=== Earth ===
Olympic Flag (1920)

"Citizen of the World Flag" by George Dibbern (1940)

Flag of the United Nations (1946)

"World Citizen Flag" by Garry Davis (1953)

"Earth Flag" by John McConnell (1969)

James W. Cadle's proposal (1970)

Jean-Sylvainkk Delroux's proposal (1970)

Paul Carroll's proposal 1 (1988)

Luis Alonso Salvador's proposal (1994)

David Bartholomew's proposal (1996)

Anne Kirstine Rønhede's proposal (2000)

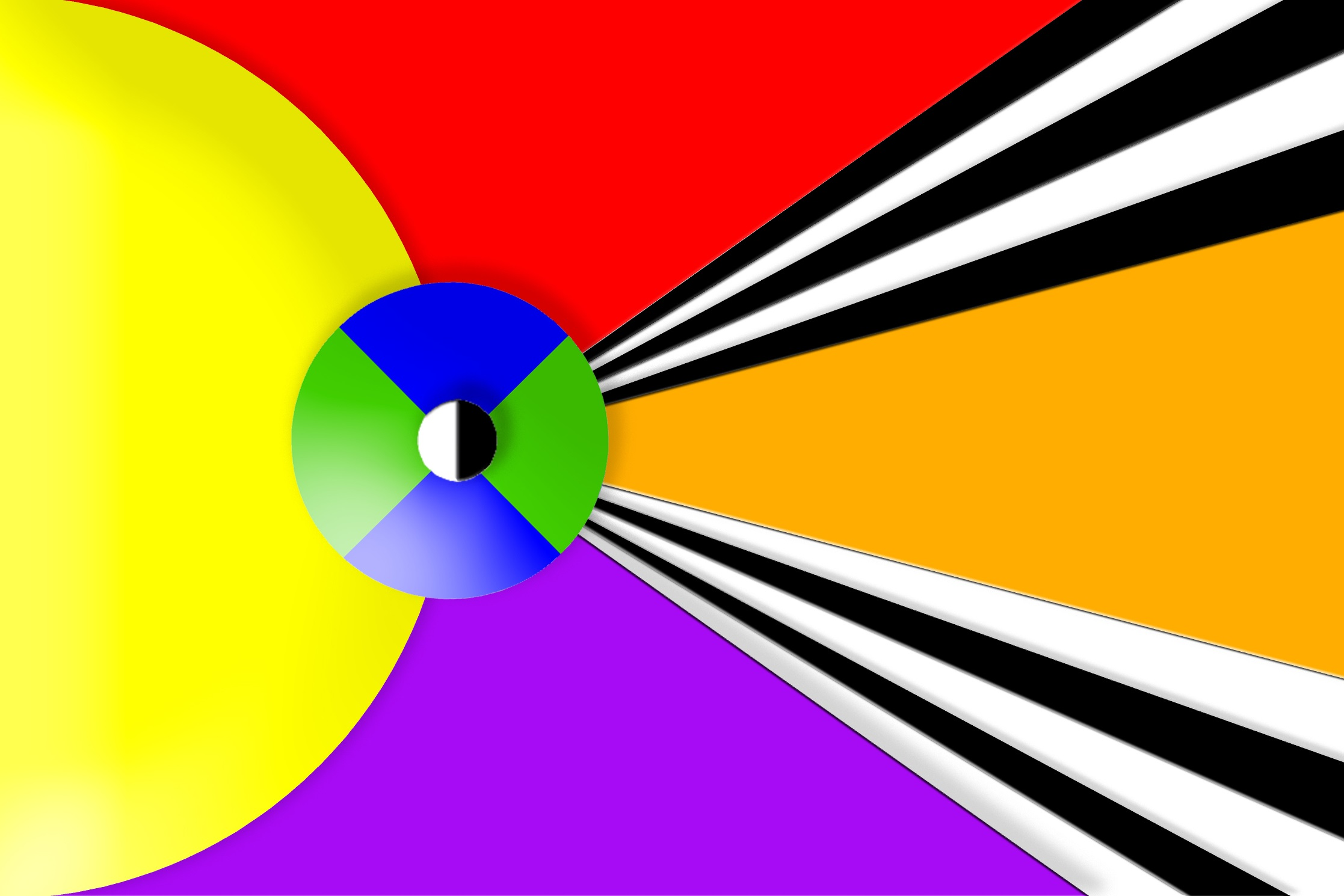
"Earth Unity Flag" (2000)

Earth Flag (after Cadle) by Philip Kanellopoulos (2004)

Earth Symbol Flag by Philip Kanellopoulos (2004)

World Flag by Philip Kanellopoulos (2004)

Blue-Green Earth Symbol Cartographic Projection by Philip Kanellopoulos (2011)

Paul Carroll's proposal 2 (2006)

Pedro Manuel Quesada López's design (2008)

Fibits Reality Adjustment's proposal (2008)

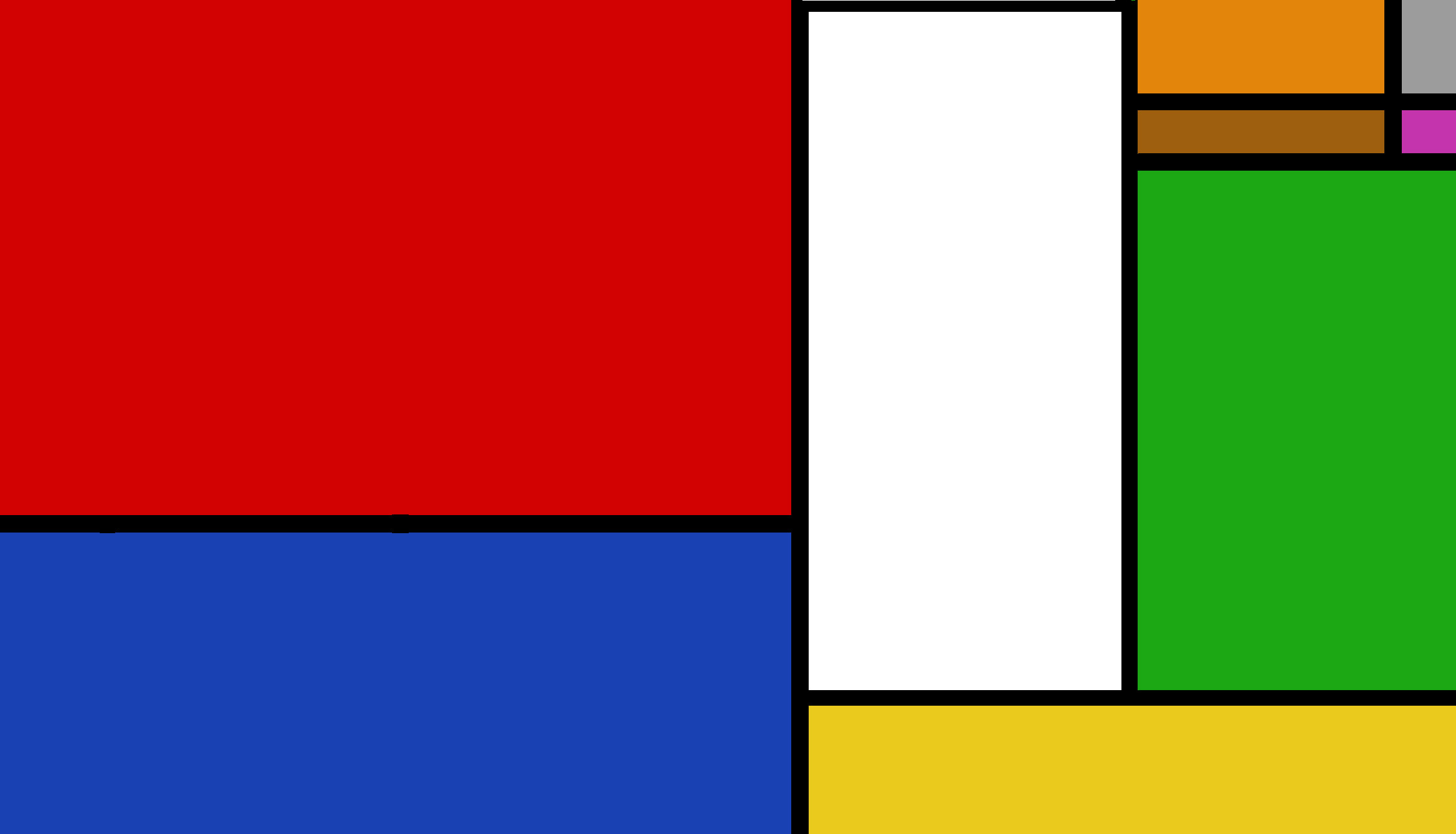
Brandpowder Team's proposal (2012)

"The International Flag of Planet Earth" by Oskar Pernefeldt (2015)

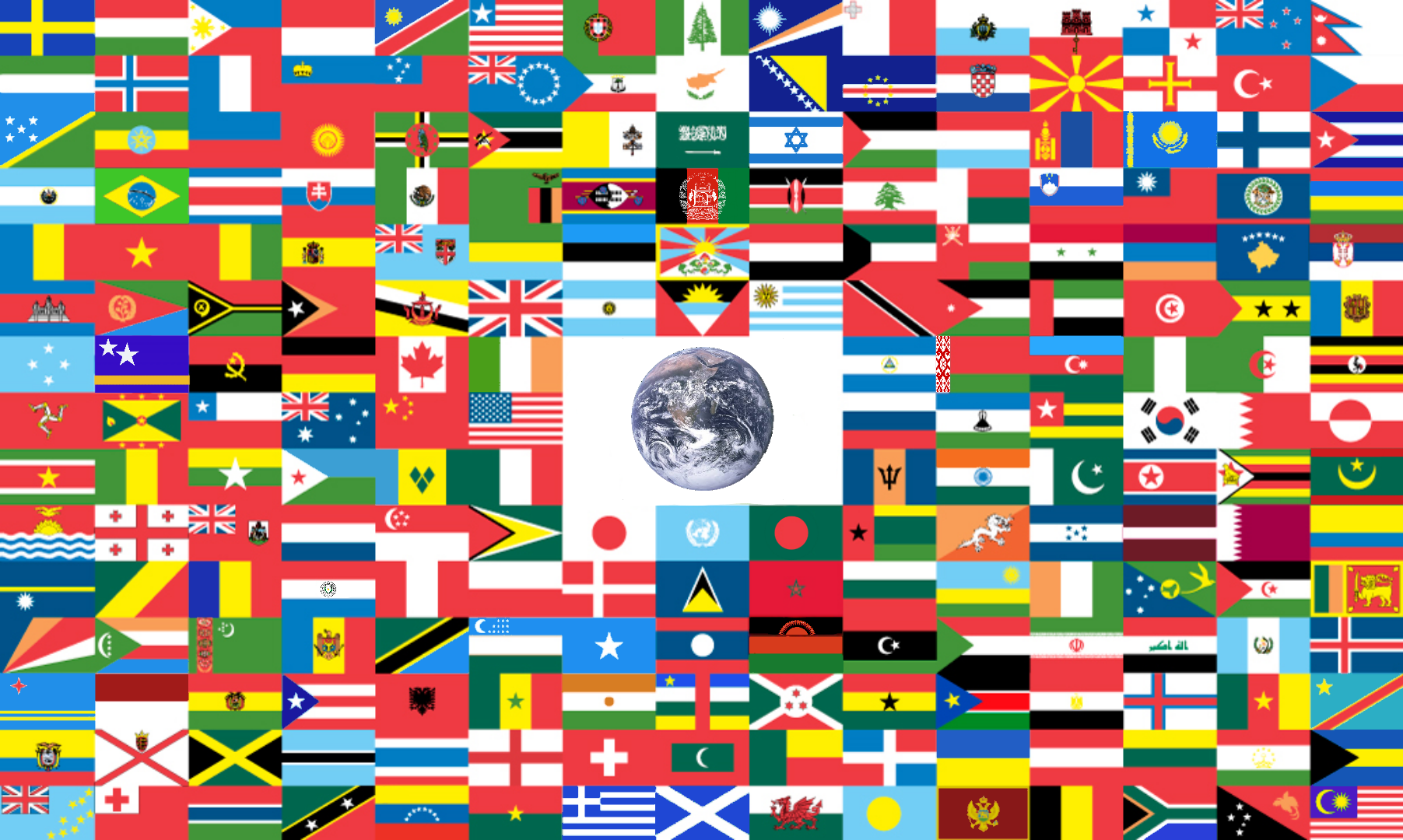
Paul Carroll's proposal 3 (2019)

=== Europe (Continent) ===
Anonymous Proposal (1920) - obverse

Anonymous Proposal (1920) - reverse

Paneuropean Union Proposal (1923)

United States of Europe Proposal (1930)

European Movement Proposal (1947)

Camille Manné Proposal (1949)

Werner S. Wulfing Proposal (1949)

August Vincent Proposal (1950)

Walther Timm Proposal 1 (1951)

Walther Timm Proposal 2 (1951)

Walther Timm Proposal 3 (1951)

Walther Timm Proposal 4 (1951)

Martin-Levy Proposal (1951)

Coudenhove-Kalergi Proposal (1951)

Prince de Schwarzenberg Proposal (1951)

Lucien Philippe Proposal 1 (1951)

Lucien Philippe Proposal 2 (1951)

Lucien Philippe Proposal 3 (1951)

Lucien Philippe Proposal 4 (1951)

Lucien Philippe Proposal 5 (1951)

Lucien Philippe Proposal 6 (1951)

Louis Wirion Proposal 1 (1951)

Louis Wirion Proposal 2 (1951)

Sommier of Neuilly Proposal (1951)

Alwin Mondon Proposal 1 (1951)

Alwin Mondon Proposal 2 (1951)

Alwin Mondon Proposal 3 (1951)

Alwin Mondon Proposal 4 (1951)

Alwin Mondon Proposal 5 (1951)

Alwin Mondon Proposal 6 (1951)

Alwin Mondon Proposal 7 (1951)

Alwin Mondon Proposal 8 (1951)

Alwin Mondon Proposal 9 (1951)

Alwin Mondon Proposal 10 (1951)

Alwin Mondon Proposal 11 (1951)

Alwin Mondon Proposal 12 (1951)

Muller of Wiesbaden Proposal 1 (1951)

Muller of Wiesbaden Proposal 2 (1951)

Harmignies Proposal (1951)

Poucher Proposal (1951)

H.C. Proposal (1951)

Coudenhove-Kalergi Proposal 1 (1951)

Coudenhove-Kalergi Proposal 2 (1951)

J. E. Dylan Proposal 1 (1951)

J. E. Dylan Proposal 2 (1951)

J. E. Dylan Proposal 3 (1951)

J. E. Dylan Proposal 4 (1951)

J. E. Dylan Proposal 5 (1951)

Unknown Proposal 1 (1951)

Unknown Proposal 2 (1951)

Arsène Heitz Proposal 1 (1951)

Arsène Heitz Proposal 2 (1951)

Arsène Heitz Proposal 3 (1951)

Coudenhove-Kalergi Proposal (1951)

Salvador de Madariaga Proposal (1951)

Wolfram Neue Proposal 1 (1951)

Wolfram Neue Proposal 2 (1951)

Wolfram Neue Proposal 3 (1951)

Wolfram Neue Proposal 4 (1951)

Michel Pélot Proposal 1 (1951)

Michel Pélot Proposal 2 (1951)

Mirko Svetkov Proposal (1951)

Lex Weyer Proposal (1951)

Louis Wirion Proposal (1951)

Arsène Heitz Proposal 4 (1952)

Paul Levy Proposal (1952)

Joseph Oberson-Bagnolet Proposal (1952)

G. A. Bornemann Proposal (1952)

Arsène Heitz Proposal 5 (1952)

Arsène Heitz Proposal 6 (1952)

Arsène Heitz Proposal 7 (1952)

Hanno F. Konopath Proposal 1 (1952)

Hanno F. Konopath Proposal 2 (1952)

Hanno F. Konopath Proposal 3 (1952)

Joseph Oberson-Bagnolet Proposal (1952)

Joseph Oberson-Bagnolet Proposal (1952)

Joseph Oberson-Bagnolet Proposal (1952)

Bichet's Proposal (1953)

Council of Europe Proposal (1953)

Arsène Heitz Proposal 4 (1954)

Arsène Heitz Proposal 8 (1954)

Arsène Heitz Proposal 9 (1954)

Alwin Mondon Proposal 10 (1951)

Alwin Mondon Proposal 11 (1951)

Arsène Heitz Proposal 12 (1954)

Arsène Heitz Proposal 13 (1954)

Arsène Heitz Proposal 14 (1954)

Arsène Heitz Proposal 15 (1954)

Arsène Heitz Proposal 16 (1954)

Arsène Heitz Proposal 17 (1954)

Bichet's Proposal (1954)

Arsène Heitz Proposal 18 (1955)

Arsène Heitz Proposal 19 (1955)

Arsène Heitz Proposal 20 (1955)

Arsène Heitz Proposal 21 (1955)

Arsène Heitz Proposal 22 (1955)

Arsène Heitz Proposal 23 (1955)

Gambin Gaetano Proposal 1 (1955)

Gambin Gaetano Proposal 2 (1955)

Gambin Gaetano Proposal 3 (1955)

Gambin Gaetano Proposal 4 (1955)

Gambin Gaetano Proposal 5 (1955)

Gambin Gaetano Proposal 6 (1955)

Gambin Gaetano Proposal 7 (1955)

White Stars Proposal (1950s)

Single Star Proposal (1950s)

Adolf Lorder Proposal (1950s)

Anonymous Proposal (1950s)

Anonymous Proposal (1950s)

Anonymous Proposal (1950s)

Anonymous Proposal (1950s)

Anonymous Proposal (1950s)

Anonymous Proposal (1950s)

Anonymous Proposal (1950s)

Anonymous Proposal (1950s)

Anonymous Proposal (1950s)

Anonymous Proposal (1950s)

Anonymous Proposal (1950s)

Anonymous Proposal (1950s)

Anonymous Proposal (1950s)

Anonymous Proposal (1950s)

Anonymous Proposal (1950s)

Anonymous Proposal (1950s)

Anonymous Proposal (1950s)

Anonymous Proposal (1950s)

Anonymous Proposal (1950s)

Anonymous Proposal (1950s)

Anonymous Proposal (1950s)

Anonymous Proposal (1950s)

Anonymous Proposal (1950s)

Anonymous Proposal (1950s)

Anonymous Proposal (1950s)

Anonymous Proposal (1950s)

Anonymous Proposal (1950s)

Anonymous Proposal (1950s)

Anonymous Proposal (1950s)

Roger Choquet Proposal (28 November 1960)

Roger Choquet Proposal (28 November 1960)

Roger Choquet Proposal (28 November 1960)

Roger Choquet Proposal (28 November 1960)

Roger Choquet Proposal (28 November 1960)

Roger Choquet Proposal (28 November 1960)

H. Boumans Proposal (November 1960)

Vollmer Költz Proposal (20 December 1960)

Wim Schuijt Proposal (28 November 1960)

J. Hoff Proposal (2 January 1961)

Rem Koolhaas Proposal (2002)

=== United Nations ===
Proposed United Nations Flag (January 1947)

== Pakistan ==
"Pak Commonwealth of Nations" (1940)

Proposed flag that appears in a pamphlet (1942)

Louis Mountbatten's Proposal for an Anglo-Pakistani Commonwealth (1947)

=== Islamabad Capital territory ===
Proposal by Dr. Tariq Saleem Marwat (2004)

== Palestine ==
Husein Mikdadi's Proposal (1929)

"An Arab From Haifa"'s Proposal 1 (1929)

"An Arab From Haifa"'s Proposal 2 (1929)

"An Arab From Haifa"'s Proposal 3 (1929)

"An Arab From Haifa"'s Proposal 4 (1929)

"An Arab From Haifa"'s Proposal 5 (1929)

"An Arab From Haifa"'s Proposal 6 (1929)

"An Arab From Haifa"'s Proposal 7 (1929)

"An Arab From Haifa"'s Proposal 8 (1929)

"An Arab From Haifa"'s Proposal 9 (1929)

"An Arab From Haifa"'s Proposal 10 (1929)

Elias Hana Rantissi's Proposal (1929)

Hamdi Can'an's Proposal

Assma Tubi's Proposal (1929)

Jaili's Proposal (1929)

As’ad Shufani's Proposal 1 (1929)

As’ad Shufani's Proposal 2 (1929)

As’ad Shufani's Proposal 3 (1929)

As’ad Shufani's Proposal 4 (1929)

As’ad Shufani's Proposal 5 (1929)

Filastin Newspaper's Proposal 1 (1929)

Filastin Newspaper's Proposal 2 (1929)

Theodore Saruf's Proposal (1929)

Munir Dakak's Proposal 1 (1929)

Munir Dakak's Proposal 2 (1929)

Munir Dakak's Proposal 3 (1929)

Proposal from the Israel State Archives (1929)

Proposal from the Israel State Archives (1929)

Proposal from the Israel State Archives (1929)

One-State Palestine Proposal 1 (2007)

One-State Palestine Proposal 2 (2007)

== Panama ==
Felipe Bunau Varilla's Proposal (1903)

== Papua New Guinea ==
Dr Wilhelm Solf's German New Guinea Proposal (1914)

Australian Trust Territory of Papua and New Guinea Proposal (1970)

== Peru* ==
General William Miller's Proposal (1820)

Nieves Limachi Quispe's Proposal (2022)

== Philippines ==
Fidel V. Ramos' Proposal 1 (1995)

Fidel V. Ramos' Proposal 2 (1995)

Fidel V. Ramos' Proposal 3 (1995)

Senator Richard Gordon's Proposal (2009)

Emmanuel L. Osorio's Proposal (2013)

== Portugal* ==
A. Rigaud Nogueira's proposal (1910–1911)

Alexandre Fontes' proposal 1 (1910–1911)

Alexandre Fontes's proposal 2 (1910–1911)

Carvalho Neves's proposal (1910–1911)

Duarte Alves Leal's proposal (1910–1911)

Antonio Augusto Macieira's proposal (1910–1911)

Alfredo Pinta da Silva's proposal (1910–1911)

António Arroyo's proposal (1910–1911)

Delfim Guimarães and Roque Gameiro's proposal (1910–1911)

First Project of the Official Commission for the new Portuguese National Flag (1910–1911)

Guerra Junqueiro's proposal (1910–1911)

J. S. Ferreira's proposal (1910–1911)

Joaquim Augusto Fernandes proposal (1910–1911)

== Republic of the Congo ==
French Congo Proposal (1959)

== Romania ==
Petre Vasiliu-Năsturel's Proposal (1848)

== Russia ==
Flag for private use planned to be adopted as a national flag (1914–1917)

A flag designed by "A. Bryanchaninov" for the Russian Republic (1917)

Alexey Kokorekin's RSFSR flag proposal (1948)

RSFSR flag proposal with the tricolour at the bottom

RSFSR flag proposal with gold Cyrillic characters

Mikhail Rodionov's RSFSR flag proposal (1950)

Flag proposed to the State Duma (1994; 1997)

Flag proposed to the State Duma (1997)

Andrew Khlobystin's Proposal (1997)

William Pokhlyobkin's Proposal (1999)

Former imperial flag proposed by Vladimir Zhirinovsky (2011)

Former flag of the Soviet Union proposed by the Communist Party (2022)

White-blue-white flag used by anti-war protesters and opponents of Vladimir Putin (2022)

=== Chuvashia ===
A.V. Pavlov Proposal (1990)

Project proposed by the Society of Chuvash Culture in Estonia Tšuvaši Kultuuriselts (1990)

Alternative project proposed by the Society of Chuvash Culture in Estonia Tšuvaši Kultuuriselts (1990)

S. A. Sindyachkin Proposal (1990)

A. V. Ulangin Proposal (1990)

=== Komi ===
Komi Nordic cross proposal (2010)

=== Tatarstan ===
Flag proposed by a special commission in 1991

== Rwanda ==
"Sunrise" Proposal possible reconstruction (1999)

"Sunrise" Proposal possible reconstruction (1999)

"Sunrise" Proposal possible reconstruction (1999)

"Sunrise" Proposal possible reconstruction (1999)

== Samoa ==
Dr Wilhelm Solf's German Samoa Proposal (1914)

== Serbia ==
Proposed flag of the Principality of Serbia (c. 1838)

Proposed flag of the Principality of Serbia (c. 1838)

Proposed flag of the Principality of Serbia (c. 1838)

=== Vojvodina ===
Proposed flag by the League of Social Democrats of Vojvodina (1990)

== Slovakia ==
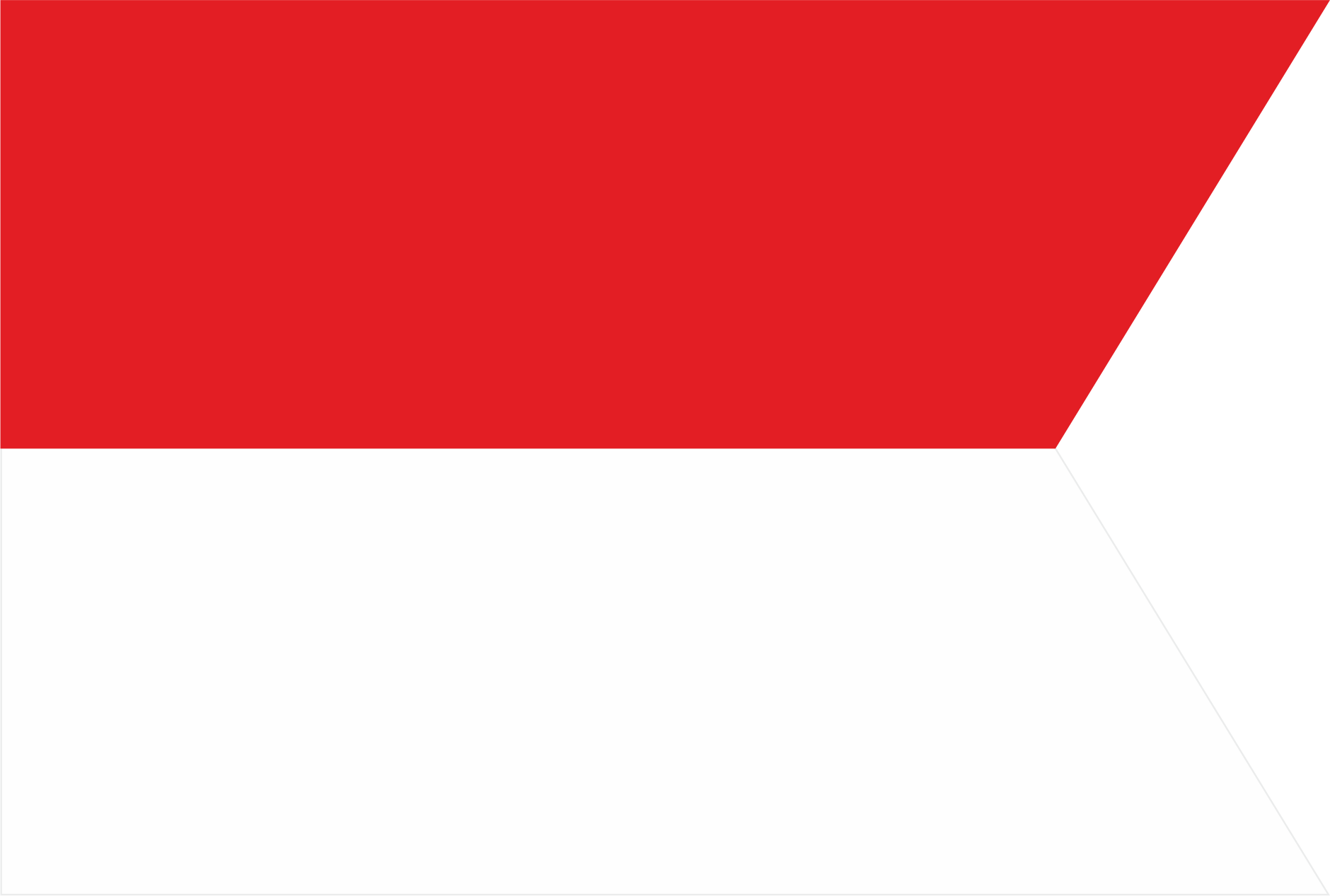
Demands of the Slovak Nation's Proposal (1848)

== Slovenia* ==
Pre-Independence Proposal (1990)

Karin & Grega Košak, and Simonida Koželj's Proposal (2003)

Miha Dobrovoljc's Proposal (2003)

Zoran Kovačevič's Proposal (2003)

Proposal (2003)

Klemen Rodman's Proposal (2003)

Dušan Jovanovič's Proposal (2003)

Miha Debeljak's Proposal (2023)

== Solomon Islands* ==
Pre-independence contest winner (1975)

== South Africa ==
See: List of South African flags/Proposed flags

Proposal 1 (1910)

Proposal 2 (1910)

1 "The 'Walker' Flag" Proposal (1926)

2 Proposal (1926)

3 Proposal (1926)

4 Proposal (1926)

5 Proposal (1926)

6 Proposal (1926)

7 Proposal (1926)

8 Proposal (1926)

9 Proposal (1926)

10 Proposal (1926)

11 Proposal (1926)

12 Proposal (1926)

13 Proposal (1926)

14 Proposal (1926)

Cross Proposal 1 (1927)

Cross Proposal 2 (1927)

Cross Proposal 3 (1927)

Committee Proposal 1 (1927)

Committee Proposal 2 (1927)

Committee Proposal 3 (1927)

South African Party Proposal (1927)

Governmental Proposal (1927)

Senate Proposal (1927)

"Verwoerd Flag" H.C. Blatt`s Proposal (1965)

"Natal Witness" Lalsingh Ramlukan`s Proposal (1992)

Commission on National Symbols Proposal 1 (1993)

Commission on National Symbols Proposal 2 (1993)

Commission on National Symbols Proposal 3 (1993)

Commission on National Symbols Proposal 4 (1993)

Commission on National Symbols Proposal 5 (1993)

Commission on National Symbols Proposal 6 (1993)

Graphic Design Studio Proposal 1 (1993)

Graphic Design Studio Proposal 2 (1993)

Graphic Design Studio Proposal 3 (1993)

Graphic Design Studio Proposal 4 (1993)

Graphic Design Studio Proposal 5 (1993)

Graphic Design Studio Proposal 6 (1993)

Rejected Shortlist Proposal 1 (1994)

Rejected Shortlist Proposal 2 (1994)

Rejected Shortlist Proposal 3 (1994)

Rejected Shortlist Proposal 5 (1994)

African National Congress's Proposal (1994)

== Spain ==
All of these proposals are by Antonio Valdés.

Antonio Valdés' Proposal 1 (1785)

Antonio Valdés' Proposal 2 (1785)

Antonio Valdés' Proposal 3 (1785)

Antonio Valdés' Proposal 4 (1785)

Antonio Valdés' Proposal 5 (1785)

Antonio Valdés' Proposal 6 (1785)

Antonio Valdés' Proposal 7 (1785)

Antonio Valdés' Proposal 8 (1785)

Antonio Valdés' Proposal 9 (1785)

Antonio Valdés' Proposal 10 (1785)

Antonio Valdés' Proposal 11 (1785)

Antonio Valdés' Proposal 12 (1785)

== Suriname ==
Proposed flag of Suriname (1954)

Proposal 1 (1975)

Modified Proposal 1 (1975)

Proposal 2 (1975)

Proposal 3 (1975)

== São Tomé and Príncipe ==
Colonial flag of São Tome and Príncipe (1932)

Almeida Langhans' Portuguese São Tomé and Príncipe Proposal (1967)

Proposal 1 (1974)

Proposal 2 (1974)

Proposal 3 (1974)

Proposal 4 (1974)

Proposal 5 (1974)

Proposal 6 (1974)

Proposal 7 (1974)

Proposal 8 (1974)

== Taiwan ==
See Proposed flags of Taiwan

Republic of Taiwan Provisional Government Proposal (1955)

Donald Liu's Proposal (1994)

Proposed flag by WUFI (1996)

908 Taiwan Republic Campaign's Proposal (2005)

World Taiwanese Congress Proposal (2013)

== Tajikistan ==
Proposal 1 (1992)

Proposal 2 (1992)

== Tanzania ==
Dr Wilhelm Solf's German East Africa Proposal (1914)

== Timor-Leste ==
Proposed colonial flag (1932)

Almeida Langhans' Portuguese Timor Proposal (1967)

== Togo ==
Dr Wilhelm Solf's German Togo Proposal (1914)

== Turkmenistan ==
Agzybirlik 1 (1991)

Agzybirlik 2 (1991)

== Ukraine ==
Soviet Ukraine Proposal (1917)

Proposal 1 (1992)

Proposal 2 (1992)

Proposal 3 (1992)

=== Crimea ===
Proposal 1

Proposal 2

Proposal 3

Proposal 4

== United Kingdom ==
Proposed Union Jack 1 (1604)

Proposed Union Jack 2 (1604)

Proposed Union Jack 3 (1604)

Proposed Union Jack 4 (1604)

Proposed Union Jack 5 (1604)

Proposed Union Jack 6 (1604)

Proposed Union Jack 7 (1604)

Proposed Union Jack 8 (1604)

Proposed Union Jack 9 (1606), later used in Scotland only until 1801.

Proposed Union Jack, incorporating the Irish Harp (1801)

Republican flag originally used by the Chartist movement (1816)

Republican tricolour proposed by Hugh Williams (1838)

Margaret Hodge's Proposal, incorporating the Welsh Dragon (2007)

Proposed Union Jack, incorporating the flag of St David

Proposed Union Jack in the event of Scottish Independence (2013)

=== Northern Ireland ===
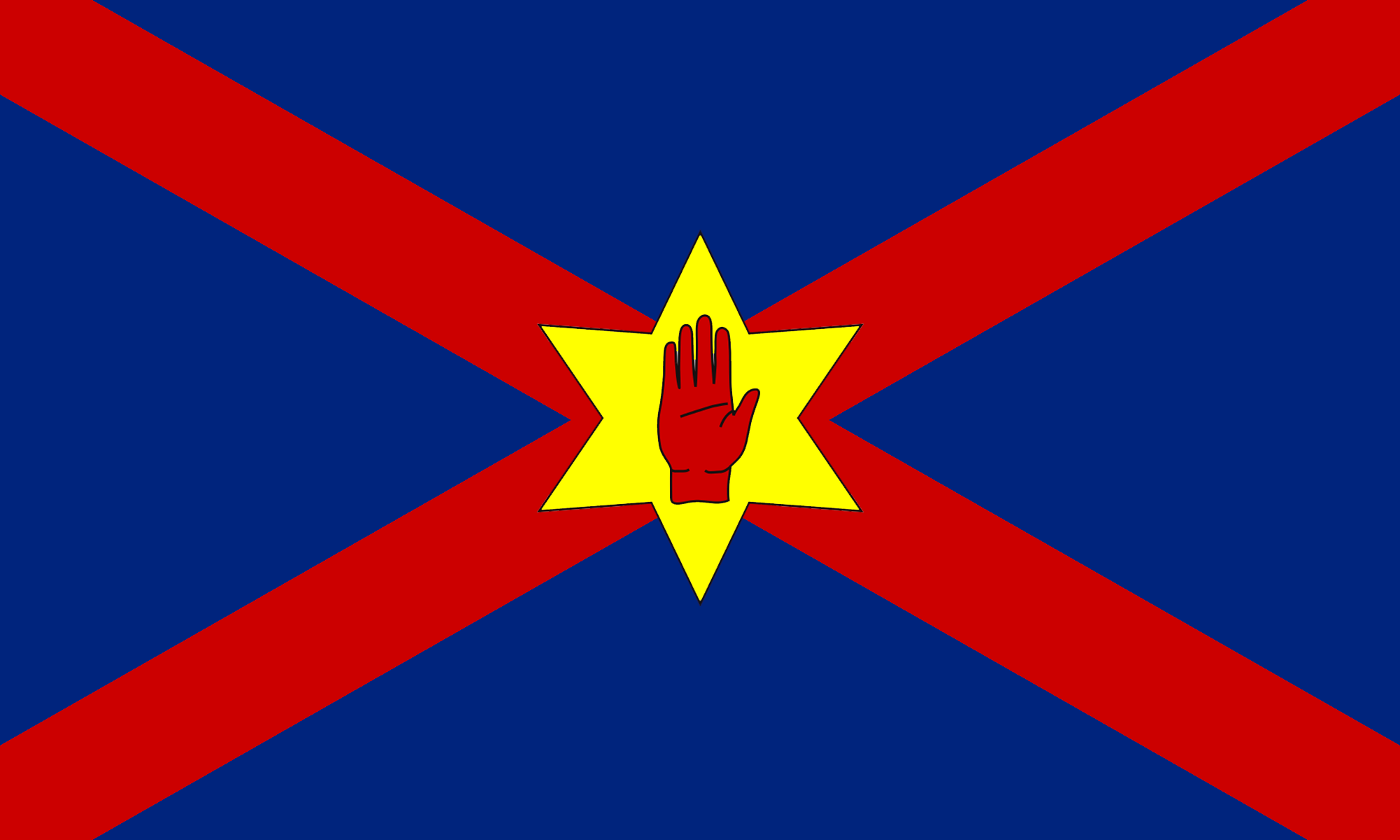
Flag proposed by Ulster nationalists

Northern Ireland Office proposal 1 (1995)

Northern Ireland Office proposal 2 (1995)

Proposal by the Alliance Party of Northern Ireland (2003)

=== Wales ===
Welsh Republican flag

Welsh Republican flag including black star

Flag of the National Patriotic Front

=== Overseas Territories ===
==== Anguilla ====
Dolphin Flag used by the unrecognised Republic of Anguilla (1967–1969)

==== Bermuda ====
In 2002, James B. Minahan proposed a design in his "Encyclopedia of the Stateless Nations" that he called "the Bermudian National Flag." He states that this proposal aims to provide Bermuda with a national symbol once it attains independence from the United Kingdom.

Independent Bermuda Proposal (2002)

==== British Indian Ocean Territory ====
Flag used by the Chagossians (2000)

==== Cayman Islands ====
James Minahan in his Encyclopedia of Stateless Nations presents this proposed Cayman Islander independence flag, although it does not seem like any Cayman Islands independence groups use this flag.

Independent Cayman Islands Proposal (2002)

== United States* ==
More than 3,000 citizens of the United States mailed proposals for how the United States flag could be changed following the admission of the states Alaska and Hawaii. A small portion of these proposals can be viewed at the Eisenhower Library Design of the 49- and 50-Star Flags online document.

== Uzbekistan ==
Cultural flag of Uzbek people proposed, based on Timurid empire flag (1969)

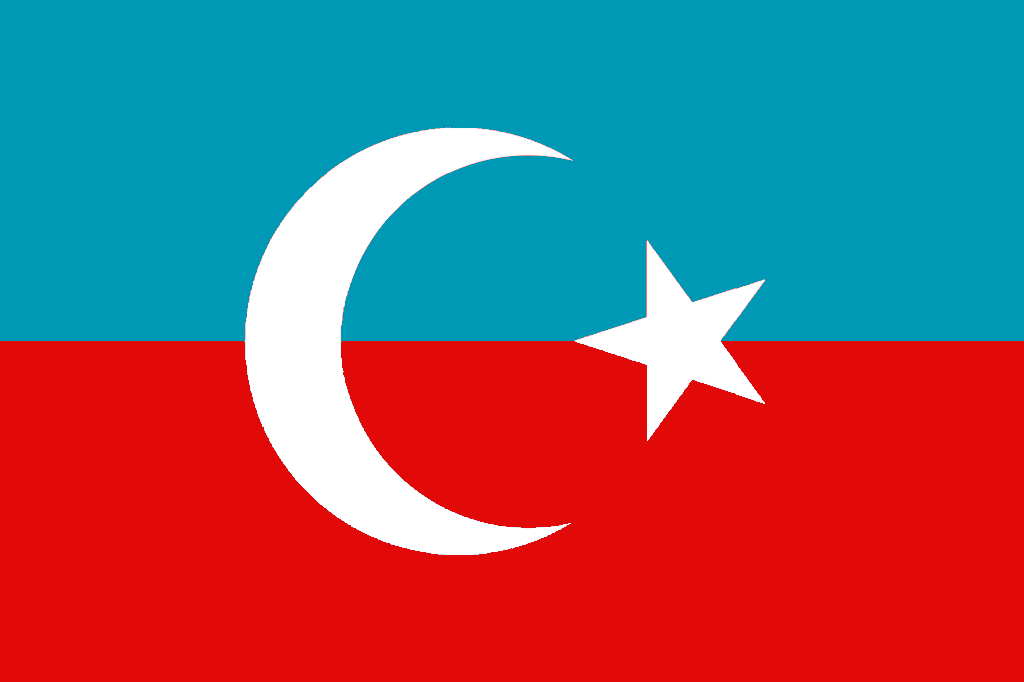
One of the proposed projects of the flag of Uzbekistan by the democratic movement, based on Turkestan Autonomy flag (1991)

One of the proposed projects of the flag of Uzbekistan by the democratic movement, based on Basmachi movement flag (1991)

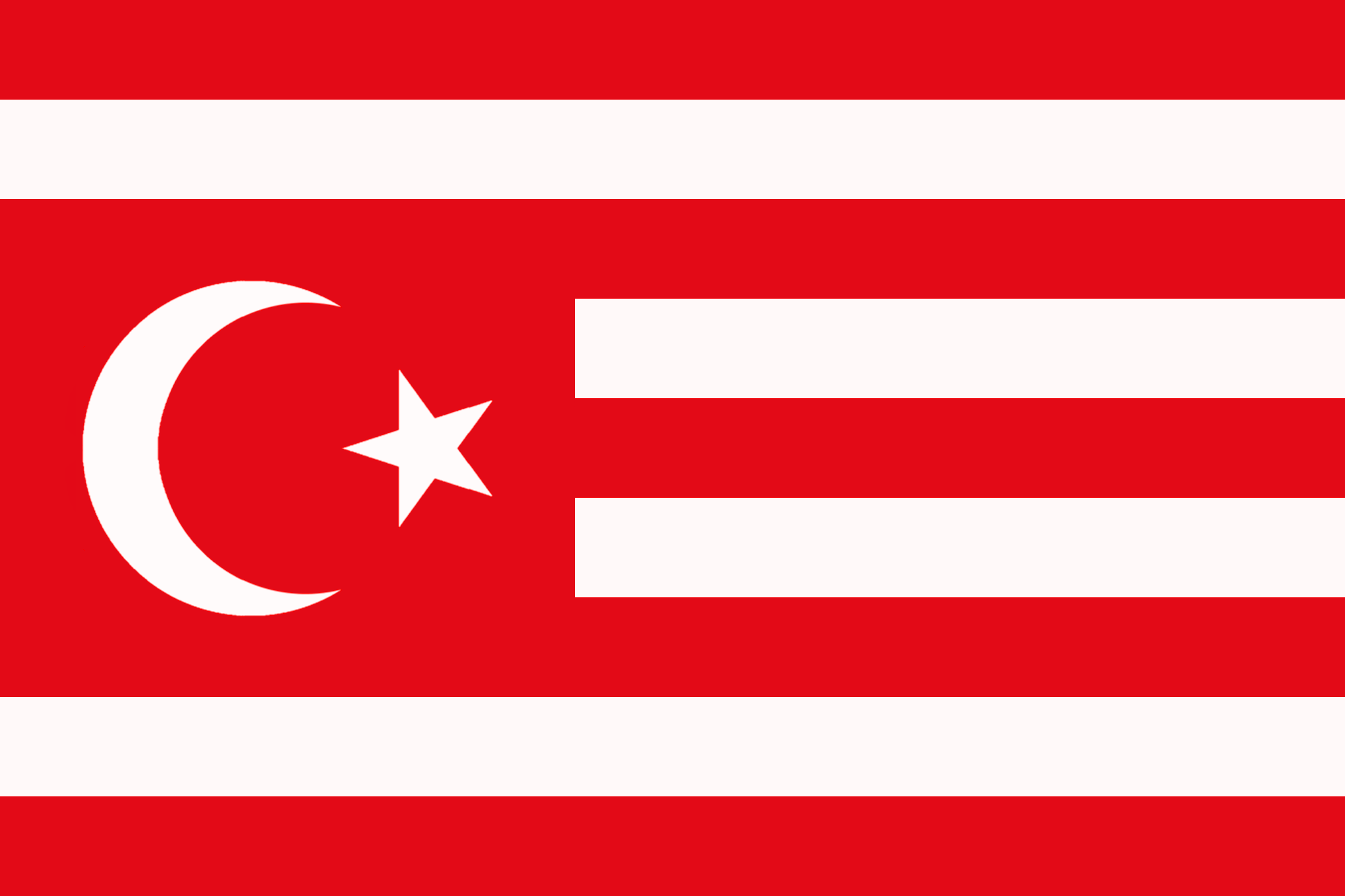
One of the proposed projects of the flag of Uzbekistan by the democratic movement, based on Basmachi movement flag (1991)

== Vietnam ==
Flag of the Republic of Vietnam (Việt Nam Dân Quốc; not associated with South Vietnam - Việt Nam Cộng hòa) according to Phan Bội Châu, associated with the Việt Nam Quang Phục Hội

Proposed flag for Vietnam by the Vietnam National Restoration League (1938)

Nguyen Thanh Tri & Tristan Nguyen's Proposal for a neutral "Reconciliation Flag of Vietnam" (1973)

International Students' Proposal for a new neutral Vietnamese flag (2013)
