= 1904 in literature =

This article contains information about the literary events and publications of 1904.

== Events ==
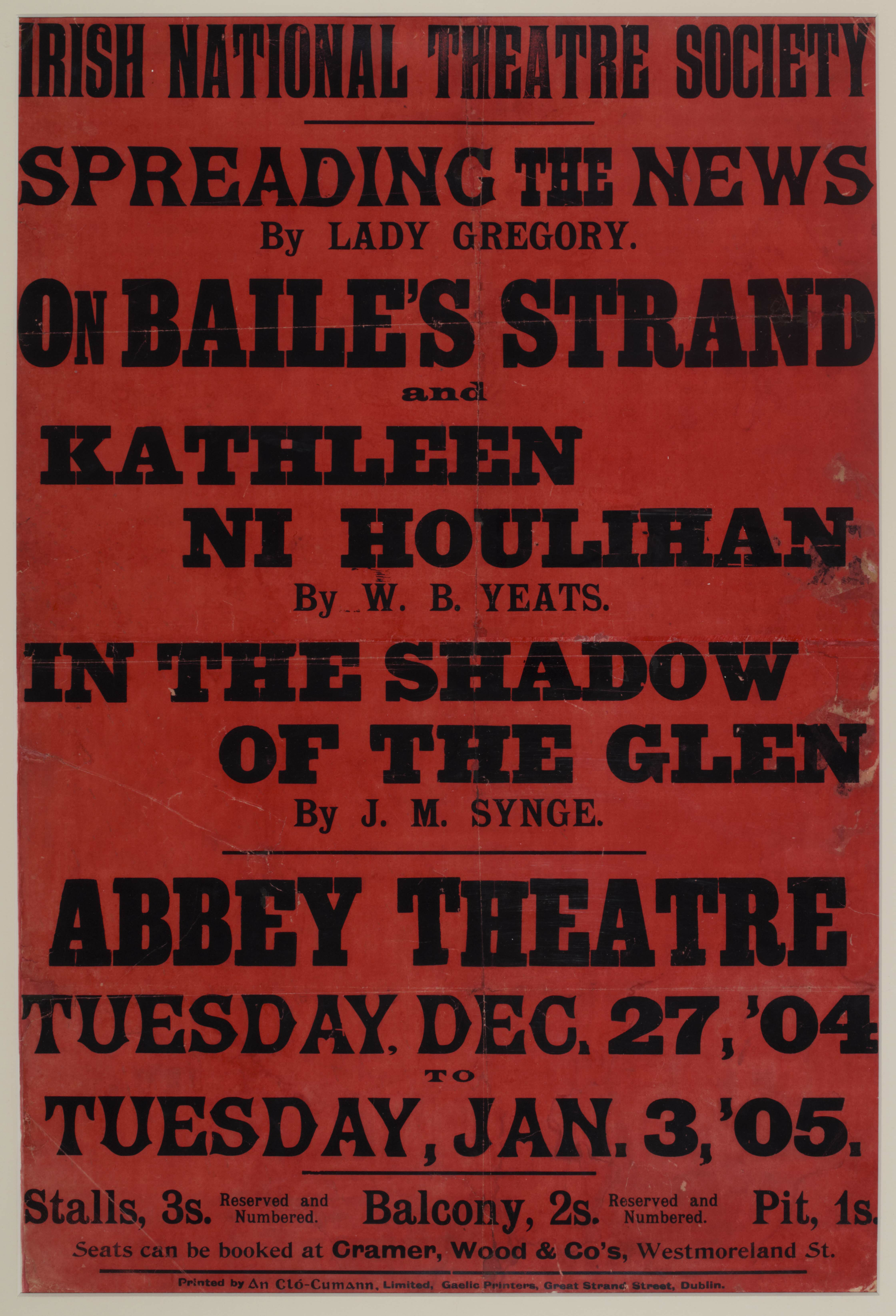
Poster for opening run at Abbey Theatre, Dublin

- January
  - Mark Twain begins dictating his Autobiography.
  - The first issue of Süddeutsche Monatshefte is published in Munich by Paul Nikolaus Cossmann.
- January 17 – Anton Chekhov's last play, The Cherry Orchard («Вишнëвый сад», Vishnevyi sad), opens at the Moscow Art Theatre directed by Constantin Stanislavski.
- February 25 – J. M. Synge's tragedy Riders to the Sea is first performed at Molesworth Hall, Dublin, by the Irish National Theatre Society.
- March 1 – Sophie Radford de Meissner's translation of Aleksey Konstantinovich Tolstoy's 1863 historical drama Ivan the Terrible is first played at the New Amsterdam Theatre on Broadway, New York City, by Richard Mansfield.
- April 24 – A Lithuanian press ban in the Russian Empire is lifted. Petras Vileišis installs a printing press in his Vileišis Palace in Vilnius.
- April 25 – Herbert Beerbohm Tree establishes what will become the Royal Academy of Dramatic Art, at His Majesty's Theatre in the London's Haymarket.
- May 10 – Virginia Woolf suffers a mental breakdown after the death on February 22 of her father, Sir Leslie Stephen.
- June 16 – The original "Bloomsday", the day James Joyce first walks out with his future wife Nora Barnacle (a chambermaid he first met on June 10), to the Dublin suburb of Ringsend. He sets the action of his novel Ulysses (1922) on this date.
- June 28 – Chekhov, suffering from tuberculosis at Badenweiler, writes to his sister Masha saying his health is improving. He dies just over two weeks later.
- September – Mark Twain buys a home at 21 Fifth Avenue, New York City.
- November 1
  - George Bernard Shaw's comedy about Ireland, John Bull's Other Island, opens at the Royal Court Theatre, London, under the management of Harley Granville-Barker after W. B. Yeats rejects it for Dublin's Abbey Theatre.
  - The Stephen family have moved to a home at 46 Gordon Square, Bloomsbury, London, where Virginia Woolf joins them about November 8. Here the Bloomsbury Group will form.
- November – Hall Caine's novel The Prodigal Son is published by Heinemann in London and opens in a dramatic adaptation at the Grand Theatre, Douglas, Isle of Man.
- December – The only known surviving copy of the first quarto edition of Shakespeare's play Titus Andronicus (published in London, 1594) is discovered in Sweden.
- December 21 – The first of Virginia Woolf's published writings, "Haworth, November 1904", an account of a visit to the Brontë family home, appears anonymously in a women's supplement to a clerical journal, The Guardian. (A book review written later has appeared in the same journal a week earlier.)
- December 24 – The Coliseum Theatre in London opens.
- December 27
  - The Irish National Theatre Society (Abbey Theatre) opens to the public in Dublin. The bill consists of three one-act plays: On Baile's Strand and Cathleen Ní Houlihan by Yeats (the latter with Máire Nic Shiubhlaigh in the title rôle), and Spreading the News by Lady Gregory.
  - J. M. Barrie's play Peter Pan, or The Boy Who Wouldn't Grow Up premières at the Duke of York's Theatre in London with Nina Boucicault in the title rôle and Gerald du Maurier as Captain Hook and Mr Darling; du Maurier is the uncle of the Llewellyn Davies boys, who inspired the story.

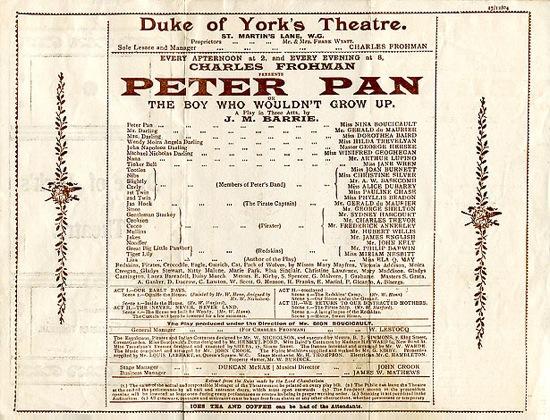
Playbill for opening run in London

- unknown dates
  - Probably early this year, Kenneth Grahame begins telling the bedtime stories to his son that are the origin of The Wind in the Willows.
  - Alexander Blok's poetry cycle Stikhi o prekrasnoi Dame (Verses to the Beautiful Lady), written to his new wife, ushers in the Silver Age of Russian Poetry.
  - Seven-year-old Wasif Jawhariyyeh begins keeping diaries, later acclaimed as masterpieces of modern Arabic and Jerusalem literature.
  - The Marquis de Sade's The 120 Days of Sodom (Les 120 journées de Sodome), written in 1785, is first published, by the Berlin sexologist Dr. Iwan Bloch (as Dr. Eugen Dühren).
  - Translations of Leo Tolstoy's War and Peace into English by Constance Garnett and by Leo Wiener are published.

== New books ==
=== Fiction ===
- Hall Caine – The Prodigal Son
- G. K. Chesterton – The Napoleon of Notting Hill
- Joseph Conrad – Nostromo
- Machado de Assis – Esaú e Jacó
- Grazia Deledda – Cenere (Ash, first book publication)
- Alexandre Dumas translated by Alfred Richard Allinson – The Wolf Leader
- Claude Farrère – Fumée d'opium (Black Opium)
- Ludwig Ganghofer – Storms in May
- John Galsworthy – The Island Pharisees
- Frederic Harrison – Theophano, The Crusade of the Tenth Century
- O. Henry – Cabbages and Kings
- Robert Herrick – The Common Lot
- Hermann Hesse – Peter Camenzind
- William Henry Hudson – Green Mansions
- Robert Smythe Hichens
  - The Garden of Allah
  - The Woman with the Fan
- Henry James – The Golden Bowl
- M. R. James – Ghost Stories of an Antiquary
- Mary Johnston – Sir Mortimer
- James Joyce – "The Sisters"
- Jack London – The Sea-Wolf
- Arthur Morrison – The Green Eye of Goona
- I. L. Peretz – "The Magician" (דער קונצענמאכער, "Der Kuntsenmakher" – short story)
- Vincas Pietaris – Algimantas (first prose novel written in the Lithuanian language)
- Luigi Pirandello – The Late Mattia Pascal (Il Fu Mattia Pascal)
- Henrik Pontoppidan – Lucky Per (Lykke-Per; publication concludes)
- Gene Stratton Porter – Freckles
- Władysław Reymont – Chłopi (The Peasants; publication commences)
- Frederick Rolfe – Hadrian the Seventh
- Romain Rolland – Jean-Christophe (vol. 1)
- Rafael Sabatini – The Tavern Knight
- Saki – Reginald
- May Sinclair – The Divine Fire
- Katherine Thurston – John Chilcote, M.P.
- Mark Twain – A Dog's Tale
- Jules Verne
  - A Drama in Livonia
  - Master of the World
- H. G. Wells – The Food of the Gods
- Owen Wister
  - A Journey In Search of Christmas
  - Philosophy 4
- Stefan Żeromski – Ashes (Popioły)

=== Children and young people ===
- L. Frank Baum – The Marvelous Land of Oz
- Laura Lee Hope (pseudonym) – The Bobbsey Twins (first of a series of 72)
- Selma Lagerlöf – The Treasure (Herr Arnes penningar)
- E. Nesbit – The Phoenix and the Carpet
- Beatrix Potter
  - The Tale of Benjamin Bunny
  - The Tale of Two Bad Mice
- Leo Tolstoy – Classic Tales and Fables for Children
- P. G. Wodehouse (prose), John W. Houghton (verse) and Philip Dadd (illustrations) – William Tell Told Again

=== Drama ===
- J. M. Barrie – Peter Pan
- Hall Caine – The Prodigal Son
- Anton Chekhov – The Cherry Orchard
- Gabriele D'Annunzio – The Daughter of Iorio
- Octave Mirbeau – Farces and Moralities
- Erich Mühsam – The Con Men
- George Bernard Shaw – John Bull's Other Island
- Tsubouchi Shōyō (坪内 逍遥)
  - Kiri Hitoha (A Paulownia Leaf; performed)
  - Shinkyoku Urashima (The New Urashima)
- J. M. Synge – Riders to the Sea
- Edgar Wallace – An African Millionaire
- Frank Wedekind – Pandora's Box
- Nik Welter – Die Söhne des Öslings
- Stanisław Wyspiański – November Night (Noc listopadowa)

=== Poetry ===
- Marie Dauguet
  - Les Paroles du vent
  - Par l'Amour
- Zinaida Gippius – «Собрание стихов. 1889–1903» (Collected Poems, 1889–1903)
- Giovanni Pascoli
  - Primi poemetti
  - Primi conviviali

=== Non-fiction ===
- A. C. Bradley – Shakespearean Tragedy
- Ernst Haeckel – Kunstformen der Natur
- Philip Henslowe (died 1616), edited by Walter W. Greg – Henslowe's Diary (publication begins)
- Thomas Nashe (died c.1601), edited by R. B. McKerrow – The Works of Thomas Nashe (publication begins)
- Okakura Kakuzo (岡倉 覚三) – The Awakening of Japan
- Thorstein Veblen – The Theory of Business Enterprise
- John Henry Wigmore – A Treatise on the System of Evidence in Trials at Common Law

== Births ==
- January 14 – Robert Speaight, English actor, biographer and essayist (died 1976)
- January 22 – Arkady Gaidar, Russian children's writer (died 1941)
- January 23 – Louis Zukofsky, American modernist poet (died 1978)
- February 1 – S. J. Perelman, American humorist and author (died 1979)
- February 4 – MacKinlay Kantor, American historian (died 1977)
- February 19 – Muiris Ó Súilleabháin, Irish memoirist (drowned 1950)
- March 2 – Dr. Seuss (Theodor Seuss Geisel), American children's writer (died 1991)
- March 26 – Joseph Campbell, American author and expert on mythology (died 1987)
- April 4 – Soeman Hs, Indonesian (East Indies) novelist and short story writer (died 1999)
- April 27 – Cecil Day-Lewis, Anglo-Irish poet (died 1972)
- May 6 – Harry Martinson, Swedish author and Nobel laureate (died 1978)
- May 20
  - Margery Allingham, English writer of detective fiction (died 1966)
  - Alexander Skutch, American scientific writer and naturalist (died 2004)
- May 22 – Anne de Vries, Dutch novelist (died 1964)
- June 16 – Eileen Colwell, English children's librarian (died 2002)
- July 13 – Pablo Neruda, Chilean poet and Nobel laureate (died 1973)
- July 21 – Ion Biberi, Romanian social scientist, novelist, and essayist (died 1990)
- August 4 – Witold Gombrowicz, Polish playwright and novelist (died 1969)
- August 10 – Dorothy B. Hughes, American crime writer and critic (died 1993)
- August 24 – Gwyn Williams, Welsh writer and poet (died 1990)
- August 26 – Christopher Isherwood, Anglo-American novelist, playwright, screenwriter, autobiographer (died 1986)
- September – Abdulla Goran, Kurdish poet (died 1962)
- September 27 – John Gwilym Jones, Welsh dramatist and writer (died 1988)
- October 2 – Graham Greene, English novelist and journalist (died 1991)
- October 12 – Ding Ling (丁玲), born Jiang Bingzhi, Chinese fiction writer (died 1986)
- November 25 – Ba Jin (巴金), born Li Yaotang, Chinese novelist (died 2005)
- November 28 – Nancy Mitford, English novelist and biographer (died 1973)
- December 13 – Glen Byam Shaw, English theatrical director (died 1986)
- December 21 – Johannes Edfelt, Swedish poet, translator and critic (died 1997)
- December 26 – Alejo Carpentier, Swiss-born Cuban novelist (died 1980)

== Deaths ==
- January 3 – Larin Paraske, Finnish folk poet (born 1833)
- January 20 – Hermann Eduard von Holst, German historian of the United States (born 1841)
- February 3 – Olive E. Dana, American author (born 1859)
- February 8 – Alfred Ainger, English biographer and critic (born 1837)
- February 22 – Sir Leslie Stephen, English essayist and critic (born 1832)
- March 2 – Mary C. Billings, American writer, evangelist, missionary (born 1824)
- April 16 – Samuel Smiles, British reformer and writer, advocate of self-help (born 1812)
- May 5 – Mór Jókai, Hungarian dramatist and novelist (born 1825)
- June 5 – Olivia Langdon Clemens, American editor (born 1845)
- July 3 – Theodor Herzl, Austro-Hungarian journalist (cardiac sclerosis, born 1860)
- July 6 – Abai Qunanbaiuly, Kazakh poet, philosopher and cultural reformer (born 1845)
- July 15 – Anton Chekhov, Russian playwright and short story writer (tuberculosis, born 1860)
- August 22 – Kate Chopin (Kate O'Flaherty), American novelist and short story writer (brain hemorrhage, born 1850)
- September 26 – Lafcadio Hearn (Koizumi Yakumo, 小泉 八雲), Greek-born writer in English on Japan (heart failure, born 1850)
- October 11:
  - Mary Tenney Gray, American editorial writer (born 1833)
  - Trumbull Stickney, American classicist and poet (brain tumor, born 1874)
- October 17
  - Dumitru Theodor Neculuță, Romanian poet (heart failure, born 1859)
  - Ștefan Petică, Romanian Symbolist poet and writer (tuberculosis, born 1877)
- October 21 – Euphemia Vale Blake, British-born American author and critic (born 1817)
- October 23 – Emilia, Lady Dilke, English art historian (born 1840)
- November 19 – Hans von Hopfen, German poet and novelist (born 1835)

== Awards ==
- Newdigate Prize: George Bell, "Delphi"
- Nobel Prize for Literature: Frédéric Mistral, José Echegaray y Eizaguirre
- First Prix Femina: Myriam Harry for La Conquête de Jérusalem
