= Fritz Gerlich =

German historian and journalist (1883–1934)

Servant of God Fritz Gerlich
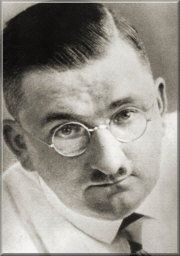
- Gerlich in 1929

Martyr
- Born: Carl Albert Fritz Michael Gerlich; 15 February 1883; Stettin, Kingdom of Prussia, German Empire
- Died: 30 June 1934 (aged 51); Dachau concentration camp, Bavaria, Nazi Germany
- Cause of death: Execution by shooting

Carl Albert Fritz Michael Gerlich (15 February 1883 – 30 June 1934) was a German journalist and historian, and one of the leading journalistic resistors of Adolf Hitler. He was arrested and later fatally shot and cremated at the Dachau concentration camp during the Night of the Long Knives.

The cause for his canonization commenced on 16 December 2017 and he is now referred to as a Servant of God.

== Early life ==
Carl Albert Fritz Michael Gerlich was born in Stettin, Pomerania, and grew up as the eldest of the three sons of wholesale and retail fishmonger Paul Gerlich and his wife Therese. In the Autumn of 1889, Gerlich was enrolled in the Marienstiftungymnasium (Our Lady's Grammar School) and graduated from his senior class there in 1901.

In 1902, he began his studies at the Ludwig-Maximilians-Universität München and first majored in mathematics and natural sciences before switching to history. At the university, he was an active member of the Freistudentenschaft (Free Student Union, sometimes translated as Free Student Association). He wrote his doctoral dissertation, "The Testament of Henry VI", and completed it in 1907.

On 9 October 1920, he married Sophie Botzenhart, born Stempfle, in Munich.

== Career ==
After completing his studies with a doctorate, Gerlich became an archivist.

He also began to contribute political articles that were anti-socialist and national conservative in the publications Süddeutsche Monatshefte, which was edited by Paul Nikolaus Cossmann, and Die Wirklichkeit (in 1917). In 1917, he also became active in the German Fatherland Party (Deutsche Vaterlandspartei) and after it was dissolved in the Anti-Bolshevist League (Antibolschewistische Liga) (1918/19).

In 1919, he published the book Communism as the Theory of the Thousand Year Reich (Der Kommunismus als Lehre vom Tausendjährigen Reich), where Gerlich compared communism with the phenomenon of redemption religion. A whole chapter in the work is devoted to denouncing antisemitism, which had gained ground because of the leading positions of many Jews in the Revolution and founding of the Soviet Union and Bavarian Soviet Republic.

=== Editor-in-chief of the Münchner Neueste Nachrichten ===
From 1920 to 1928, he was editor in chief of the Münchner Neueste Nachrichten (MNN), a predecessor to today's Süddeutsche Zeitung in that its circulation was one of the largest in southern Germany. As editor, Gerlich opposed Nazism and Hitler's Nazi Party as "murderous". In the early 1920s, he had seen proof of Nazi tyranny already in Munich. Once a conservative nationalist, after the 1923 Beer Hall Putsch, Gerlich decisively turned against Hitler and became one of his fiercest critics. Other critics of the Nazis at MNN were later arrested within days of Gerlich, such as: Fritz Buechner, who followed Gerlich as the editor of the MNN, Erwein Freiherr von Aretin, who was domestic editor at the MNN, and Cossmann, who wrote for the MNN, all of whom had steered the MNN to support a return of the monarchy.

=== Friendship with Therese Neumann ===
By 1927, he had befriended Therese Neumann, a Catholic mystic from Konnersreuth, Bavaria, who supported Gerlich's resistance activities. Initially, he wanted to expose her stigmata as a fraud, but Gerlich came back a changed man and later converted from Calvinism to Catholicism in 1931. From that year until his death, his resistance became inspired by the social teachings of the Catholic Church.

=== The Straight Path newspaper ===
Gerlich returned in November 1929 to his job at the Bavarian National Archives. A circle of friends that had developed around Neumann gave rise to the idea of founding a weekly political newspaper to dispute the left and right political extremism in Germany. Supported by a wealthy patron, Prince Erich August Waldburg-Zeil, Gerlich was able to take over the weekly newspaper Sunday Illustrated (Der Illustrierte Sonntag), which was renamed The Straight Path (Der Gerade Weg) in 1932.

In this newspaper, Gerlich opposed communism, Nazism, and antisemitism. The dispute with the growing Nazi movement became the central focus of Gerlich and his later writing. At the end of 1932, the weekly circulation had over 40,000 readers.

Gerlich once wrote, "National Socialism means: Enmity with neighbouring nations, tyranny internally, civil war, world war, lies, hatred, fratricide and boundless want."

In 1932, Gerlich criticised and mocked the pseudoscientific Nazi racial theories when he published a satirical article titled "Does Hitler Have Mongolian Blood?" in an attempt to prove that Hitler was not an Aryan by suggesting that his nose was of a Mongoloid type.

According to Gerlich's colleague Erwein von Aretin, at the time of his arrest Gerlich was preparing an exposé accusing Hitler of involvement in the Reichstag fire and the murder of his niece Geli Raubal.

== Arrest and death at Dachau ==
After the Nazis seized power on 30 January 1933, Gerlich was arrested on 9 March 1933 and held at the Dachau concentration camp, where he was shot on 30 June 1934 during the Night of the Long Knives. His death was officially announced days after his arrest, and the announcement was published in the international press at the time. He was cremated and his ashes given to his wife.

== Fictional portrayals ==
Gerlich was portrayed in the TV movie Hitler: The Rise of Evil by actor Matthew Modine. In the film, as he dictates a front-page article that warns of the danger that Hitler poses, Gerlich finishes with the words: "The worst thing we can do, the absolute worst, is to do nothing". This line is inspired by a quote often incorrectly attributed to Edmund Burke: "The only thing necessary for the triumph of evil is for good men to do nothing."
