= Dadd =

Dadd or Dadds is a surname. Notable people include:

- Ellie Dadd (born 2005), English actress
- Hannah Dadds (1941–2011), British train driver
- Ince Gordon Dadds, law firm
- Philip Dadd (1880–1916), British illustrator
- Rachael Dadd, English folk musician
- Richard Dadd (1817–1876), English painter
- Robert Dadds (born 1992), English squash player
