= Süddeutsche Monatshefte =

German magazine, 1904–1936

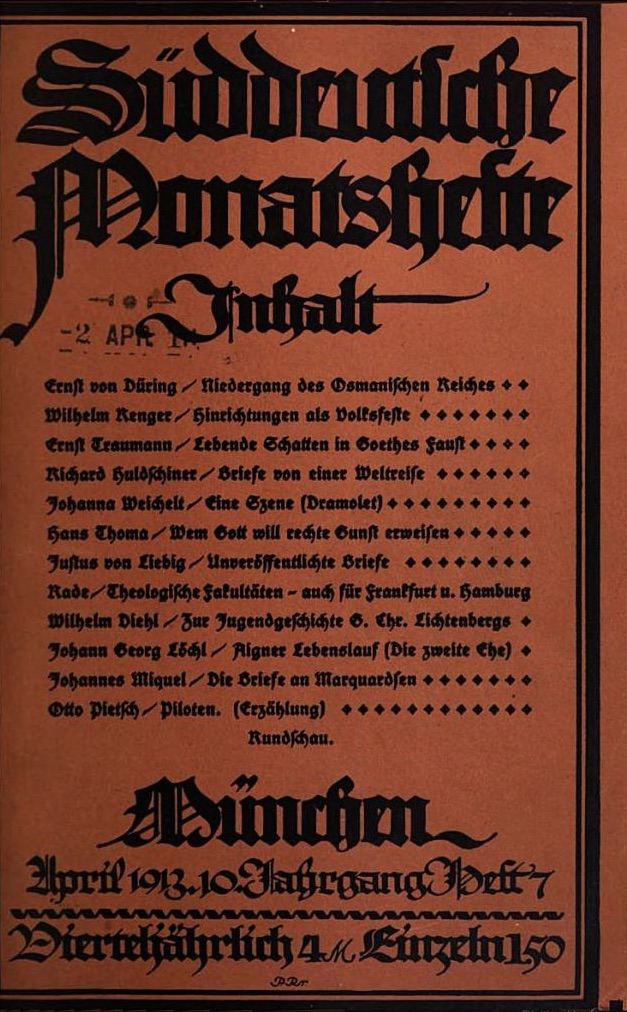
- April 1913 cover of Süddeutsche Monatshefte
- Editor: Paul Nikolaus Cossmann (first); Leo Hausleiter (last)
- Categories: art magazine, literary magazine, political magazine
- Total circulation: 100,000 (ca. 1918)
- First issue: January 1904
- Final issue: September 1936
- Company: Knorr & Hirth Verlag
- Country: German Empire (to 1918); Weimar Germany (1919–1933); Nazi Germany (from 1933)
- Based in: Munich, Bavaria
- Language: German

Süddeutsche Monatshefte ("South German Monthly", also credited as Süddeutscher Monatshefte) was a German magazine published in Munich between January 1904 and September 1936. After beginnings as an art and literary venue, liberal but highly critical of modernism, it made a turn toward politics before World War I. Especially supportive of German conservatism, it was also sympathetic toward Völkisch ideologists, and published propaganda in favor of militarist politicians such as Alfred von Tirpitz. Having for its founder and editor Paul Nikolaus Cossmann, an assimilated Jew, Süddeutsche Monatshefte was generally antisemitic—strongly so after 1920, when it hosted calls for racial segregation.

Its publication of conspiracy theories such as the stab-in-the-back myth paved the way for Nazi propaganda, but Süddeutsche Monatshefte was more closely aligned with the mainstream right. It played a part in conspiratorial alliances supporting the policies of Gustav von Kahr, although it also had Conservative Revolutionaries among its core contributors. In its late years, Süddeutsche Monatshefte turned to Bavarian nationalism and Wittelsbach loyalism, becoming a target for the Nazi regime. Cossmann was imprisoned for dissidence, then deported for his Jewishness; Leo Hausleiter took over, leading Süddeutsche Monatshefte until its disestablishment in 1936.

== Beginnings ==
Established as a mainly social-liberal tribune by Cossmann, a Jewish writer who had converted to Catholicism, Süddeutsche Monatshefte initially sought to reaffirm the cultural importance of Southern Germany and solidify its symbiotic relationship with Prussia, creating cultural bridges between Catholics and Protestants. Joining the directorial staff in the first edition was liberal pastor-politician Friedrich Naumann (its political director to 1913), who shared editorial oversight with painter Hans Thoma and composer Hans Pfitzner. Protestant social reformer Martin Rade and Joseph Schnitzer, a Modernist Catholic, were noted guest writers, with Cossmann acting as neutral host. During the federal election of 1907, the magazine hosted debates between Schnitzer and Center Party militant Martin Spahn, on Political Catholicism and its role in society (a divisive one, according to Schnitzer). However, according to historian Adam R. Seipp, Süddeutsche Monatshefte was mainly an interface for traditional Munich—Catholic, "deeply conservative", "suspicious of outside influences", and antithetical to the modernist Simplicissimus.

Cossmann managed to attract important writers to the magazine's permanent staff, including Josef Hofmiller and Karl Alexander von Müller. In its early issues, Süddeutsche Monatshefte hosted mainly essays by the likes of Hofmiller (such as his 1909 putdown of the modernist author Robert Walser), Carl Spitteler, and Karl Voll, and poetry by Paul Ilg.

Some of the cultural and social chronicles had nationalist undertones, debating over the requirements of German modernization. As Anglophiles, Hofmiller, Lujo Brentano, and Theodor Vogelstein suggested fusing Anglo–American lessons in modernity with the German Volkstum, to make Germany a more competitive capitalist nation; in 1906, a Dr. Paul Tesdorf went further, promoting eugenics as a means to engineer a better people. In contrast, Naumann and other authors worried about finance capitalism and oligopolies, exhorting a German nationalism based on "democratic capitalism" or syndicalism, and following closely the development of Marxist revisionism. In a February 1906 obituary for the "legal socialist" Anton Menger, Eugen Ehrlich commented that the term "socialism" had virtually lost its mystique.

The magazine took a distinctly liberal position on education reform, with Rade supporting the Jewish studies movement. Most of the contributors, in particular Gustav Wyneken, were critics of the Herbartian educational tradition; Wyneken's polemics with the more conservative Friedrich Wilhelm Foerster were taken up by Süddeutsche Monatshefte. In 1909, the journal was also one of the first to host Hans Driesch's philosophical tracts, discussing the concept of becoming in history and nature. In 1913, it aired Moritz Geiger's grievances against experimental psychology, implicitly a defense of classical phenomenology.

Debates about innovation were carried into the artistic realm. An early contributor, Henry Thode, wrote articles which censured modern art from conservative and antisemitic positions, attacking modernist critics such as Julius Meier-Graefe. In 1911, the debate was taken further: Süddeutsche Monatshefte hosted both Carl Vinnen's manifesto against French "invasion" in German art, as well as the more cautious, pro-modernist, replies to Vinnen, from: Thoma, Lovis Corinth, Gustav Klimt, Max Klinger, Max Slevogt, Count Kalckreuth, Wilhelm Trübner, and Auguste Rodin. In various other issues, Süddeutsche Monatshefte carried polemical essays by aestheticists such as Rudolf Borchardt and Paul Zarifopol.

== Wartime and revolution ==
In January 1913, Süddeutsche Monatshefte made official its doctrinal links with anti-democratic conservatism: Robert von Pöhlmann published an article condemning majoritarianism, demanding instead the remodeling of Germany into a Kulturstaat ("civilization-state"), with a politically enshrined social stratification. Naumann resigned in protest against veiled accusations him in Pöhlmann's article, but also because the magazine had discarded liberal democracy.

Süddeutsche Monatshefte saluted the July 1914 Crisis and the outbreak of World War I: in the September issue, Karl Mayr wrote that the war signified "internal transformation". The magazine's nationalism became extreme over the following months, with Cossmann arguing in favor of Siegfriede ("victory peace") and Müller celebrating Prussia as a "heroic-aristocratic warrior state"; similarly, Hermann Oncken and Friedrich Meinecke wrote praises of militarism and Prussian virtues. Süddeutsche Monatshefte promoted an increasingly radical right-wing platform, supporting militarists Alfred von Tirpitz and Erich Ludendorff while excoriating more moderate military and political elements. In 1916, Cossmann and his magazine defended Tirpitz's submarine war policy, submitting evidence that Tirpitz critic Veit Valentin had falsified military reports. These were times of notoriety for the magazine: prior to the war, Süddeutsche Monatshefte circulation stood at a few hundred copies, rising to 3000-5000 ca. 1914, and increasing sharply after that, reaching 100,000 at times.

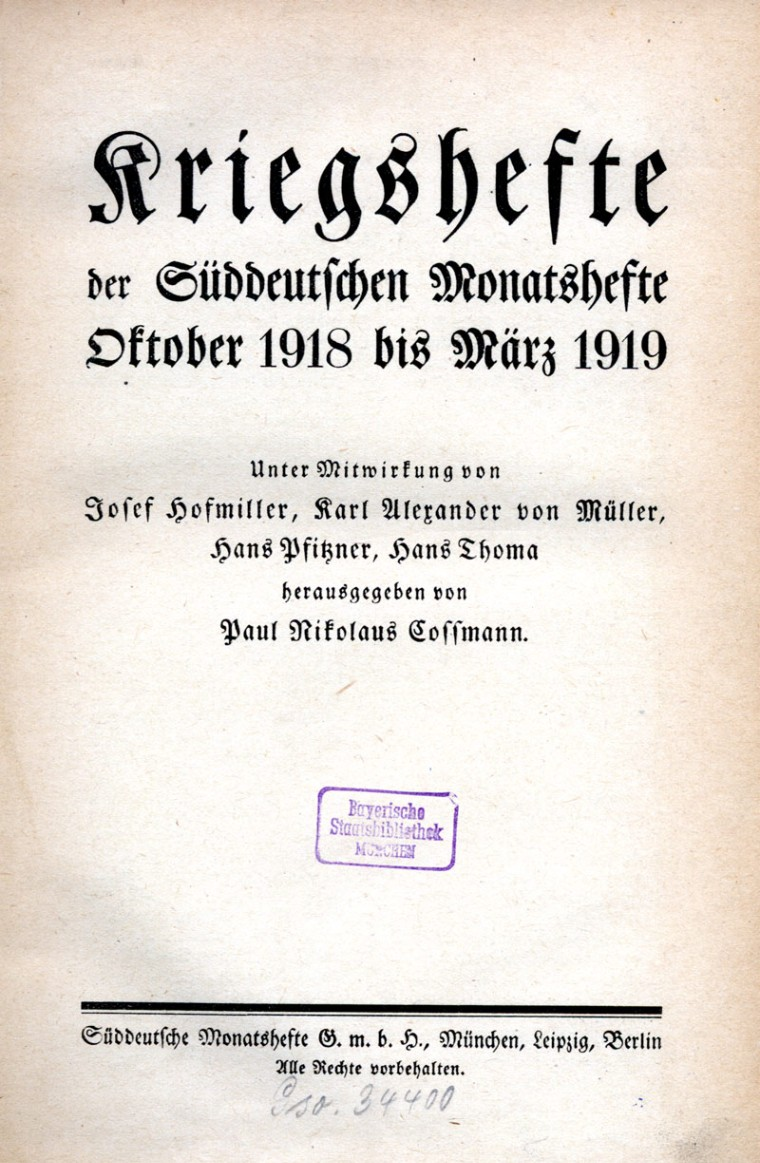
October 1918 issue of the Süddeutsche Monatshefte "war book"

The journal hosted topical literature on war politics and alarming reports from the field, including Spahn's coverage of civilian defeatism in Alsace-Lorraine. In 1915, Eduard Meyer, Georg Kerschensteiner, and Ludwig Curtius published here their thoughts on the political and historical revelations of war, introducing theses about nationalist rivalry as the source of progress and European civilization. Aiming to strengthen German propaganda in neutral Spain, the magazine hosted exposes depicting Iberian Federalism as a product of French intrigues, and homages to the conservative Mauristas.

Taking much interest in the "Jewish Question" in German-occupied Poland, Süddeutsche Monatshefte exaggerated the magnitude of conflicts between Jews and Poles. A special issue of February 1916 was dedicated to Ashkenazi Jews. It included a piece by Eugen Fuchs of the Jewish Centralverein, who urged for assimilation, the "unwavering cultivation of German sentiments". Also featured were articles by Zionists Max Bodenheimer and Franz Oppenheimer, who purported that "Eastern Jews" were natural allies of German nationalism. More radical Jewish intellectuals, primarily Kurt Blumenfeld and Moses Calvary, reacted against this juxtaposition, accusing Bodenheimer of having given up on Zionist ideals. Cossmann was also irritated by the "uncritical" views of Bodenheimer and his followers, which, he argued, were essentially "platitudes".

The editorship viewed the November 1918 Revolution and consequent fall of the monarchy as a disaster; its nationalist agitation was strengthened in the wake of the Munich Soviet Republic and the establishment of the Weimar Republic. In that context, its antisemitism also became more radical, integrating notions about "Jewish Bolshevism", and dropping ethical distinctions between assimilated and non-assimilated Jews, although Cossmann remained rather critical of such analogies. In February 1919, it became the first mainstream publication to host an article by Müller's brother-in-law Gottfried Feder. The self-taught economist and German Workers' Party ideologue explained his fight against "interest slavery", soon after developed into an explicitly antisemitic program. At around the same time, the Süddeutsche Monatshefte press put out a brochure by Elias Hurwicz, a Jewish Russian refugee in Berlin. Its pessimistic prognosis was that world revolution had become an unstoppable "torrent".

== Versailles and "stab-in-the-back" claim ==
Circulation remained high in 1918–1920, before steadily declining over the subsequent decade. Cossmann found backing from powerful industrialists, aristocrats, and Bavarian People's Party (BVP) figures, who also sponsored him and his secretary Franz von Gebsattel to buy and publish the daily Münchner Neuste Nachrichten, overbidding their Jewish competitors. This circle included Tirpitz, Prince Eugen zu Oettingen-Wallerstein of the secretive Gäa-Club, Gustav von Kahr, Albert Vögler, and corporate backers from the Gute Hoffnungshütte. Although Kahr's ally, Cossmann did not support its regionalist platform, and was only interesting to Bavarian nationalists as an enemy of the Social Democratic Party (SPD). He was sympathetic toward Karl Jarres of the mainstream German People's Party, trying to obtain him votes from the BVP. In December 1922, however, he and other Süddeutsche Monatshefte men were involved in Tirpitz's conspiratorial project against Weimar, which discussed the creation of a German dictatorship under Kahr.

From 1921, Cossmann's magazine took notice of the emerging Conservative Revolutionary movement, accepting its critique of Völkisch traditionalism, and bringing in the radical sociologist Max Hildebert Boehm as a contributor. Ricarda Huch also contributed, in March 1923, with Schlagwörterkrieg ("War of Slogans"), a national-anarchist satire of the League of Nations. Another noted presence was philosopher Oswald Spengler, whose writings for Süddeutsche Monatshefte talked about recapturing the "spirit of 1914", theorized as a voluntarist reshaping of power relations. Spengler reassured Cossmann's readers that the Treaty of Versailles was a mere "pause for breath" in the otherwise unstoppable progress of Pan-Germanism.

The journal railed above all against Versailles' War Guilt Clause, campaigning for the return of German colonies, and publishing in 1924 Heinrich Schnee's highly popular tract, Die koloniale Schuldlüge ("The Lie of the Colonial Guilt"). It also explored in depth the crisis of German nobility, with essays by aristocrats such as Otto von Taube and Ewald von Kleist-Schmenzin. In his contribution, the latter also sketched out a plan for German settlement in the East.

Süddeutsche Monatshefte also became notorious by advocating for the stab-in-the-back myth, according to which Germany had not been truly defeated in 1918, but betrayed from within. The accusation, backed by the Spenglerian philosophical stance (defeat was a failure of national will), was notably taken up by Cossmann—with a focus on the wartime Social Democrats. The Münchener Post responded by criticizing Cossmann, and Cossmann sued the Post editor, Martin Gruber, for libel; it became a celebrity trial. Cossmann won when Judge Hans Frank, himself a radical nationalist, ruled that he had acted in the public interest by publishing wartime letters attributed to SPD pacifist Felix Fechenbach. Süddeutsche Monatshefte helped instigate the political trial against Fechenbach.

== Late 1920s polemics ==
In its final decade, Süddeutsche Monatshefte became "mainstream", a "serious journal of the conservative bourgeoisie", hosting contributions by right-wing assimilated Jews such as Leo Baeck, alongside antisemitic Germans like Theodor Fritsch, Ernst Jünger, and Count Reventlow. Like the BVP, it was ambiguous toward the nascent Nazi movement in the wake of the Nazis' Beer Hall Putsch. Spengler, who felt that Nazi adventurism had ruined his own budding project for an industrialist timocracy, broke with the Cossmann club, denouncing its failure to preclude the Putsch.

By 1927, the magazine again had a focus on eugenics, as well as racial hygiene and natalism. Hosting a topical essay by Spengler, it had contributions by eugenicists Otmar Freiherr von Verschuer, Alfred Ploetz, and Fritz Lenz. Issuing predictions about the "fate of our race", Lenz discussed the Nordic race in relation to the German people, while statistician Richard Korherr contributed Geburtenrückgank ("Birth Rate"), a much-read study of the West's population decline. These works were complimented in 1929 by a Friedrich Burgdörfer essay on biopolitics and the alleged Slavic population pressure on Germany's eastern frontier, suggesting counteraction through German recolonization. In other ways the magazine contradicted Völkisch tenets. Sexologist Max von Gruber wrote that most of the "greatest men of our race" were not purely Nordic, but "hybrids", and that productive miscegenation was in the national character. Franz Spina's 1928 piece on the Sudeten Germans expressed support for a rapprochement between Germany and the Czechoslovak Republic. Also, as noted by historian Bernd Weisbrod, Süddeutsche Monatshefte's racial antisemitism was of the moderate variety embraced by the National Populists. This was notably illustrated by its hosting, in September 1930, of an article by Jünger, in which the novelist suggested that self-segregation was "the most efficient weapon" against Jews.

Returning to its critique of cultural imports at the height of the international Jazz Age, the magazine was focusing its attacks on modern American culture, and especially its African component. Korherr and Wilhelm von Schramm took up Spenglerian themes about the "inconsiderate", "nihilistic", "Americanized" architecture of modern Berlin. Jünger's articles, however, showed leniency toward modernization and a more critical stance against Völkisch tropes: he conceived of the "German national revolution" as an urban uprising, and decried peasant conservatism as outdated, "doomed to failure". Süddeutsche Monatshefte writers were also undecided about the import of physical education and the Weimar youth's emphasis on recreational sport: Ulrich von Wilamowitz deplored these developments, while Wilhelm Wien saw in them signs of recovery from "the postwar chaos".

The popularity of German occultism and alternative medicine was examined by Cossmann's journal, over several issues. Astrologers such as Oscar A. H. Schmitz were allowed to introduce their work to the magazine's middle-class readership, although their essays generally refrained from making astrological inferences. With articles by Sven Hedin and others, the magazine expressed skepticism against the fantastic travel accounts of F. Ossendowski, and against modern mysticism in general.

== Nazi ascendancy to power ==
Shortly after the onset of the Great Depression, Süddeutsche Monatshefte resumed campaigning for "the revival of war generation" and the fulfillment of its "historical destiny"—themes central to the essays of Edgar Julius Jung, which saw print in Cossmann's magazine. In the late 1920s, Jung was outlining here his vision of neo-feudalism and grassroots democracy, as conservative resources against centralizing SPD governments. With monarchism on the decline, the journal still gave exposure to Wilhelm II's apologists, hosting Adalbert Wahl's 1929 study "The Monarchy in German History".

Some of the journal's contributors looked into new forms of authoritarianism. Jünger's 1930 text lambasted liberalism and Italian Fascism, noting that the latter only existed as a "simplified and shortened" version of the former. He envisaged a "stricter solution" to Germany's political and economic woes. The economic crisis brought in opportunities for corporatist and social credit schemes, which were taken up by Ludwig Reiners, who proposed creating a national labor conscription service on such grounds. After a republican Voluntary Labor Service came into force in 1932, an article by Werner Beumelburg celebrated its role in national pedagogy and social advancement.

The journal's conservative position was at odds with Nazism, just as the latter was growing in popularity and numerical strength. Reventlow, who had since adhered to the Nazi Party, still frequented the Süddeutsche Monatshefte, where, in September 1930, he published a Nazi manifesto that called not just for "complete separation" from the Jews, but also for their "annihilation". Cossmann himself rejected Nazi racial theory but, as sociologist Werner Jacob Cahnman has noted, his earlier work in propaganda had unwittingly given the Nazis "a rousing slogan and terrific impetus". According to Cahnman, Cossmann "just did not wish to see the writing on the wall".

In early 1933, Cossmann and his collaborator Erwein von Aretin, who had openly criticized Adolf Hitler in 1923, called for a monarchist coup against the nascent Nazi regime that would see Crown Prince Rupprecht placed on the throne. Setting out its platform, the magazine's January cover bore the title "King Rupprecht". The pair were arrested and imprisoned. Cossmann, described by scholar Steven E. Aschheim as "a tragic victim of the breakdown of the German–Jewish symbiosis", was sent to the ghetto of Berg am Laim in 1941, and died at Theresienstadt concentration camp in 1942.

The magazine continued to run to 1936 under Nazi publisher Leo Hausleiter, but became both insignificant and apolitical during this last phase. A late controversy came in October 1933, when Paul Wentzcke commemorated in his articles 1920s Rhenish separatism, depicting it as a popular self-help movement against Weimar incompetence. Some of the final issues had encomiums of Nazi architecture, penned by art reviewers such as Hubert Schrade (who celebrated the Nuremberg Rally as a "sacred space"). Having already hosted comments by Erwin Liek on holistic health in November 1932, other such issues had contributions by Nazified Neo-Adlerian therapists: Fritz Künkel, who favored reintegrating patients within the "greater community"; and Harald Schultz-Hencke, who talked about a "rediscovery of the soul" by psychiatric science. Süddeutsche Monatshefte also published, in February 1936, the first version of Carl Jung's introductory essay, "Psychological Typology".
