= Psychoanalyse und Yoga =

1923 book by Oscar Adolf Hermann Schmitz

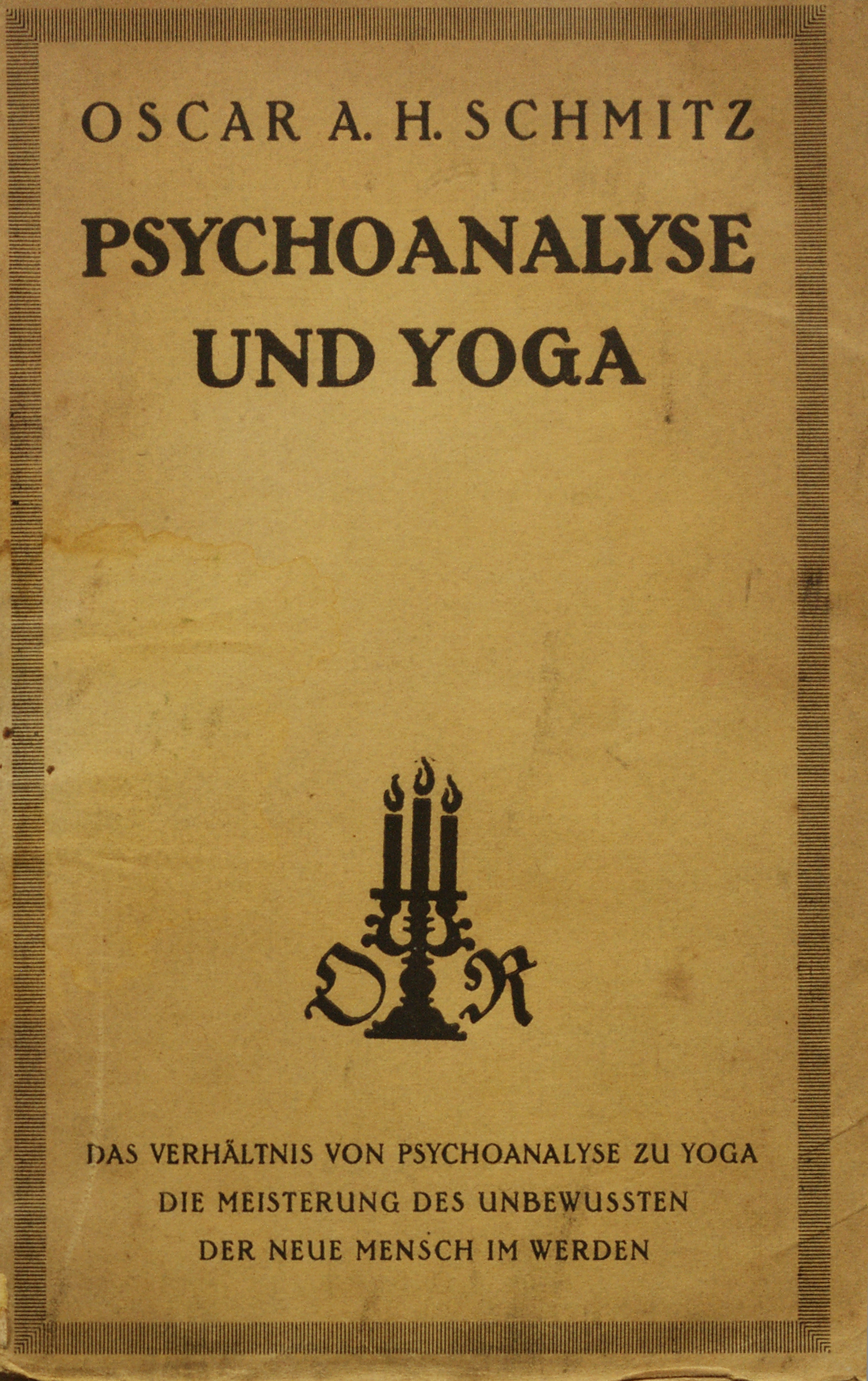
- Title page of the book
- Author: Oscar A.H. Schmitz
- Language: German
- Subjects: Psychoanalysis, Yoga
- Set in: Darmstadt, Germany
- Publisher: Otto Reichl Verlag
- Publication date: 1923
- Publication place: Germany
- Media type: Print
- Pages: 193

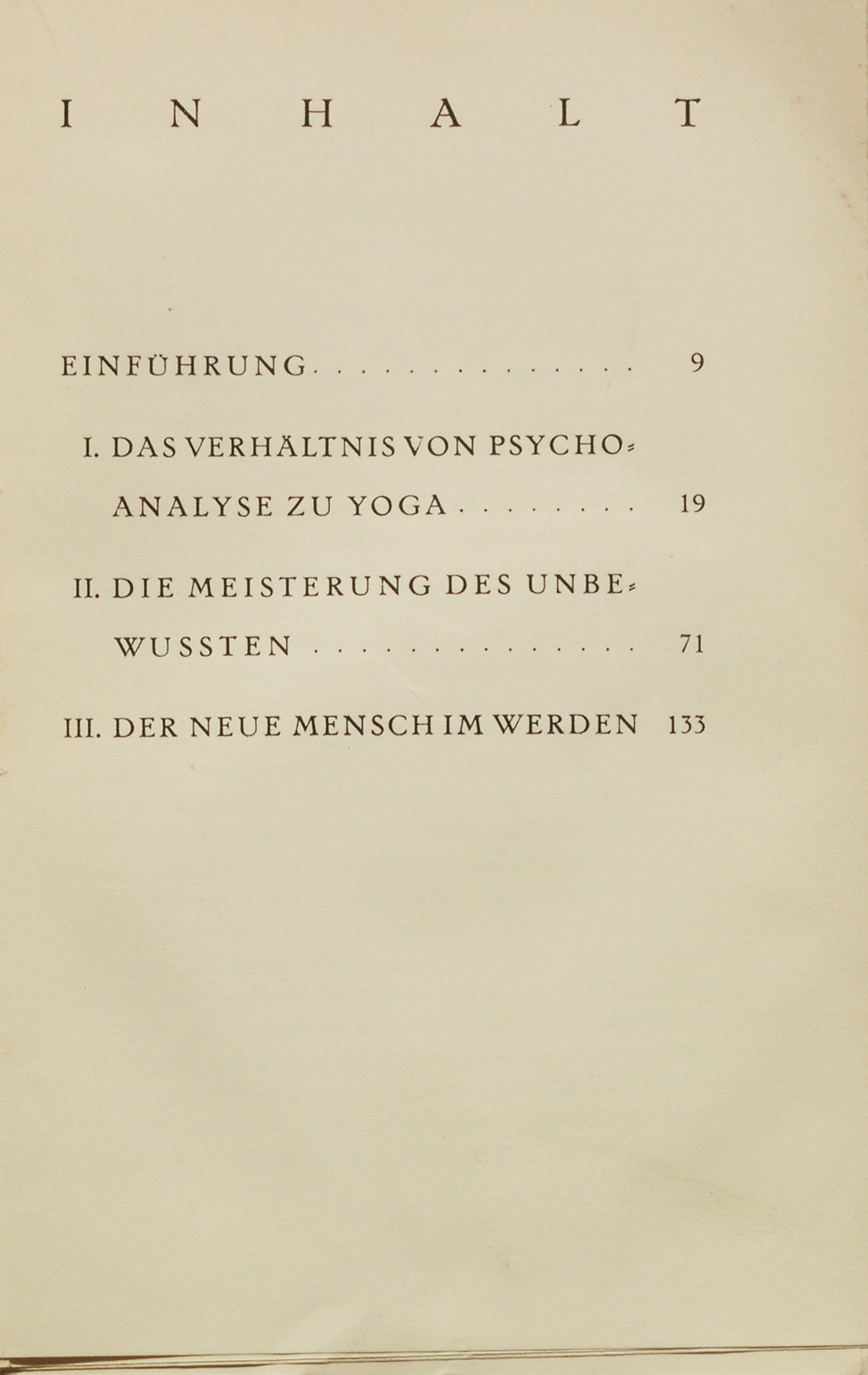
Index page of book

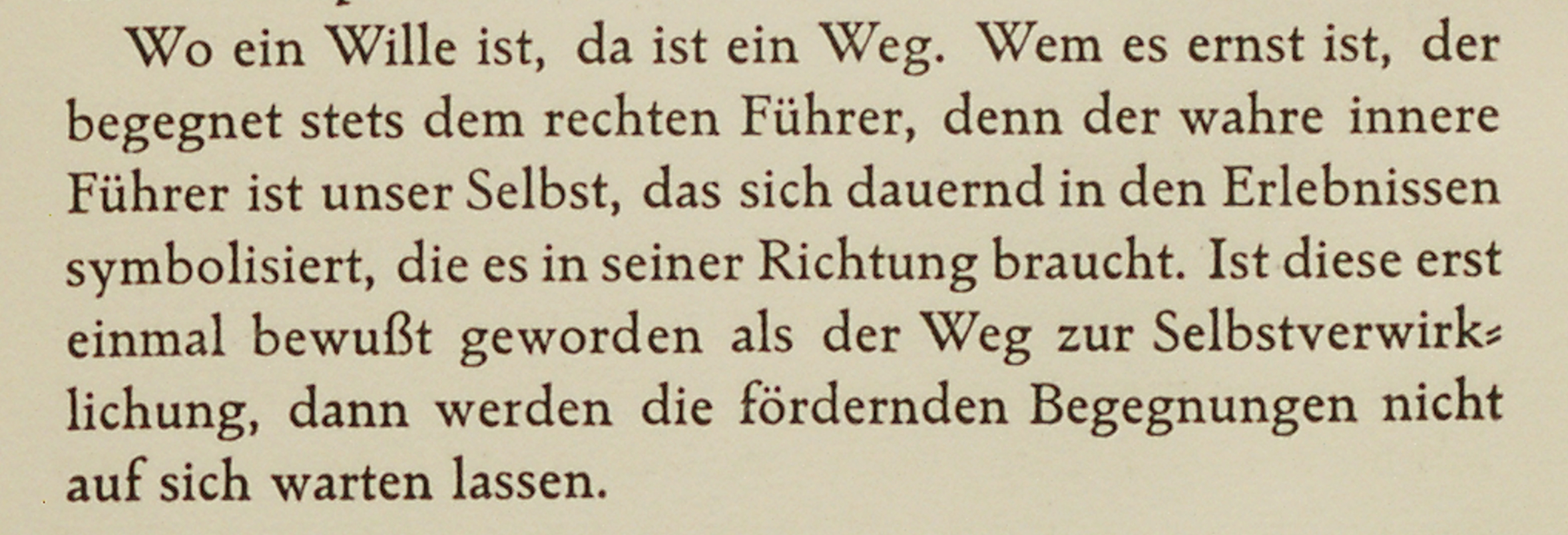
Page 69 from the book

Psychoanalyse und Yoga (English: Psychoanalysis and Yoga) is a 1923 book by the German writer and philosopher Oscar Adolf Hermann Schmitz (16 April 1873 – 17 December 1931). The book introduces the synthesis of the Indian yoga method and the European psychoanalysis with the aim to create a yoga system for Europeans. The content of his essay is an elaboration on a lecture series about yoga and psychoanalysis given at the psychoanalytic conference of the School of Wisdom, which took place on the 3rd until 5 March in 1923.

Since 1916, Schmitz worked on a framework that should include yoga and psychoanalysis, but he lacked the final piece that would have allowed him to meaningfully combine them. The inspiration for the absolute binding of yoga and psychoanalysis came from a correspondence with Count Hermann Keyserling, an associate of Schmitz and one of the founders of the school of wisdom, to whom Schmitz dedicated the book. Keyserling's doctrine of creative self-awareness (schöpferische Selbsterkenntnis) serves as a basis for this synthesis and states that there is only one aim in life, namely self-fulfillment, which can be attained by a combination of both methods.

== Content ==
The book is split into three sections, which build upon each other in order to explain the logic behind the synthesis of the two opposing methods, yoga and psychoanalysis. Schmitz not only attempts to relate them, but he tries to establish psychoanalysis as a European yoga method. In the first part, he explains general terms and concepts of yoga and psychoanalysis and how they relate to each other by referring to the Indian philosophy and different schools of psychoanalysis. In general, he believes that both methods were developed because people have the natural desire to search for a way to unify the individual with the true, inner self. In Indian philosophy, this true inner self is also known as the Atman, which every person should become aware of.

While Yoga is a method to separate from the world to find unity with the personal origin, psychoanalysis instead focuses on the isolated parts of the individual and analyses them critically. However, there is no certain way of how to integrate the single pieces back together into one unity. As a result of their differences, the two methods complement each other. Yoga tries to silence a person's conscious awareness in order to let the unconscious surface. This allows a person to free himself from it and to finally find Atman. However, Europeans are often held up to reach in-depth self-knowledge because they are afraid of their unconscious, which can only be identified and eliminated with the help of psychoanalysis.

Schmitz elaborates on the characteristics of the different schools of psychoanalysis by Sigmund Freud, Alfred Adler, and Carl G. Jung. In his opinion, the Jungian system comes closest to the Indian yoga method in that it considers a person's psyche as an individual unity and not as a function or part of society. According to Jung's analytical psychology, a person's conscious self is only one-sided. Additionally, every person has underdeveloped functions in their unconscious, which need to be freed from repression. Psychoanalysis can help to identify these traits and use them to combine those one-sided elements into the true individuality of a person. In that way, psychoanalysis can contribute to higher human development and self-knowledge.

In the second part, Schmitz examines in-depth the structure and development of the human unconscious, how a person is influenced by it and what a person can do to reveal the unconscious parts of his or her personality. According to him, during the creation of a human being, the psyche is split. In the early years of childhood, a person is aware of their drives and impulses but later on builds up barriers to repress them. The stronger these barriers are the greater is the fear of revealing the unconscious and consequently psychoanalysis. But only if a person reaches self-knowledge can the different elements of the human psyche be reunited. Additionally, Schmitz emphasizes that, since self-fulfillment is an individual process, every person needs to find their own way of achieving it and therefore, every person needs their own yoga method.

The last part is centered on the new man for whom Schmitz attempts to develop a European Yoga system.

== Jung's reception ==
In a letter to Schmitz from 26 May 1923, Carl Jung comments on the work and states his point of view. Even though he agrees with the general comparison between his analytical psychology and yoga, he remains critical about the adaptation of the yoga method to the European culture.

To the extent that I regard the psychoanalytical and psychosynthetic methods as an instrument for self-improvement, your comparison with the yoga method seems to me extremely plausible. But I feel necessary to emphasize, that it is merely an analogy because nowadays far too many Europeans are inclined to accept Oriental ideas and methods uncritically and to translate them into the mental language of the Occident. In my opinion, this is detrimental both to ourselves and to those ideas. The products of the Oriental mind are based on its peculiar history, which is radically different from ours.

In the remainder of his letter, Jung emphasizes that yoga works as a method to gain self-knowledge and self-improvement for Indians, as their unmarred historical development provides each individual with a clear foundation. Europeans, however, are a collection of nations who have lost their primitive roots. As a change for self-improvement must come from within, Europeans need to primarily rediscover their origins. Yoga as a method for self-fulfilment only works if it can build upon a stable basis. As long as this is not given, Jung refers to it as merely an Indian 'analogy' to the European psychoanalysis and not a replacement.

Additionally, a short review written by P. Masson-Oursel in the Journal de psychologie normale et pathologique from 1925 supports Jung's view and emphasizes that the comparison between yoga and psychoanalysis is impossible since yoga is no intellectual method and differs in its aim from the European psychoanalysis.

== Historical context ==
Published in (Germany) in 1923, the book was written during the interwar period in Europe. After suffering through the first world war, Germans had to cope with war memories and accusations of guilt. Thus, the German mindset was centered on overcoming the past (Bewältigung der Vergangenheit) not only concerning the current historical developments but also with a focus on each person's individual past. Since the late 19th century, psychoanalysis had been on the rise which is also occupied with a person's history, crisis resolution, and self-discovery. Especially after the first world war, unveiling an individual's past, complexes and early childhood experiences became even more important, as people desired to find the way back to their origins. As one school of psychoanalysis, Jung's analytical psychology emphasized the division of the individual into the consciousness, the personal unconscious, and the collective unconscious. Especially the two latter types are discussed in the book as being in the center of psychoanalysis as a therapy method. Jung's analytic psychology was influenced less by science but rather by philosophy, spiritualism, and his interest in the Eastern religion and culture. The fact that Schmitz subscribes to the Jungian school of thought might also come from his fascination with the Indian culture. As an associate of the school of wisdom, Schmitz was in contact with many scholars practicing yoga and the Indian philosophy.

Yoga arrived in Western Europe in the 18th century and gained attention with the romantic period. During this time, India was glorified and seen in contrast to the German rational and emotionless culture. Especially the German literature approached the Indian culture in an affirmative and philosophical way. Additionally, as scholars translated works on the Indian philosophy and yoga into German, the ideas became accessible for the wider public. Spiritualism and occultism joined the general interest for the Indian culture. The fascination for the Indian culture continued and was examined more in depth during the 19th and 20th century by philosophers like Arthur Schopenhauer and Hermann Hesse.

Therefore, Schmitz examined and compared yoga and psychoanalysis already in their early stages of development in Europe. The book is likely one of the first that discusses their relationship and synthesis.

== See also ==
- Indian philosophy
- Oscar Adolf Hermann Schmitz
