= Bernhard Cossmann =

German cellist

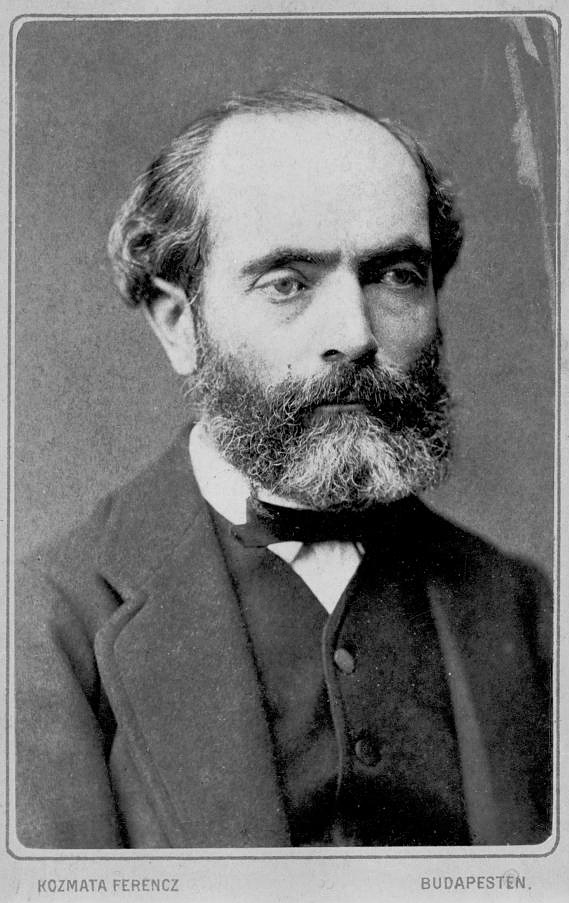

Bernhard Cossmann (17 May 1822 – 7 May 1910) was a German cellist. Born in Dessau, he first studied under Theodore Muller. During his life, he worked for the Grand Opera in Paris and became acquainted with Franz Liszt, with whom he went to Weimar. In 1866, Cossmann was appointed professor of cello studies at the Moscow Conservatory. However, in 1878, Cossmann helped found the Hoch Conservatory in Frankfurt, where he occupied the post of teacher of cello.

Cossmann was not only a frequent soloist and quartet member, but was also a composer. His works include three fantasias, Tell, Euryanthe, and multiple solo works for various instruments. In addition, he composed many etudes and studies for the cello, many of which are still used today.

In 1890 Cossmann adapted Schubert's Erlkönig for solo cello for the exclusive use of his student Heinrich Kiefer. He wrote this in his score on Frankfurt 28. Nov. 1890 by B. Cossmann.

Bernhard Cossmann, author of many original works and of diverse “Phantasien” on motifs from operas (such as Freischutz, Euryanthe, etc.) as well as on well-known pieces (also for solo cello such as “Paraphrase sur une chanson populaire allemande Ach, wie ist’s möglich dann. Thüringen Volkslied”), had formerly dedicated his Fünf Neue Concert Etuden to Heinrich Kiefer.

The transcription of Erlkönig was given to Kiefer in manuscript, for his exclusive use, because with his great talent he would be able to explore the possibilities of the piece and bring it to life; we know that in reality Kiefer studied the Erlkönig prepared by his maestro very carefully and wrote another copy (now in a private collection) with many alterations.

Cossmann’s transcription reveals a special admiration that he and the Italian virtuoso Alfredo Piatti had for each other, about which Carl Fuchs wrote: “Alfredo Piatti was one of the great cellists. He dedicated to my master Cossmann his Twelve Caprices, beautiful studies. The admiration of these two great cellists was mutual, for Cossmann dedicated his five great Concert Studies (op.10) to Piatti.”

He died in Frankfurt.

One of Crossman's sons, Paul Nikolaus Cossmann (born 1869), author of a brief book on Hans Pfitzner (1904), died of typhus at Theresienstadt in 1942. Crossman's niece Pauline Volkstein was also a musician and composed over 1,000 songs.
