= Caroline Valentin =

German musicologist (1855–1923)

- Born: 17 May 1855; Frankfurt
- Died: 26 May 1923 (aged 68); Frankfurt
- Education: Frankfurt Conservatory
- Occupation: musicologist
- Children: Veit Valentin

Elisabeth Caroline Valentin (17 May 1855 – 26 May 1923) was a German musicologist.

== Life ==
She studied music at the Hoch Conservatory and married Veit Valentin, a linguist and music teacher. Her son, also named Veit Valentin, became a historian.

== Career ==
Caroline Valentin's major work is Geschichte der Musik in Frankfurt am Main (History of Music in Frankfurt am Main), published in 1906 under the Society for History and Antiquities. She authored several biographies for the General German Biography and contributed to the planning of a biographical project focused on Frankfurt, commissioned by the Frankfurt Historical Commission.

She was a member of the German Association of Female Citizens. Her grave is located in the Frankfurt Main Cemetery.

== Work ==
- Geschichte der Musik in Frankfurt am Main vom Anfange des 14. bis zum Anfange des 18. Jahrhunderts (1906)/ History of Music in Frankfurt am Main from the Beginning of the 14th to the Beginning of the 18th Century (1906)
- Theater und Musik am Fürstlich Leiningischen Hofe. Dürkheim 1780–1792, Amorbach 1803–1814/ Theater and Music at the Princely Court of Leiningen: Dürkheim 1780–1792, Amorbach 1803–1814
