= Veit Valentin =

German historian (1885–1947)

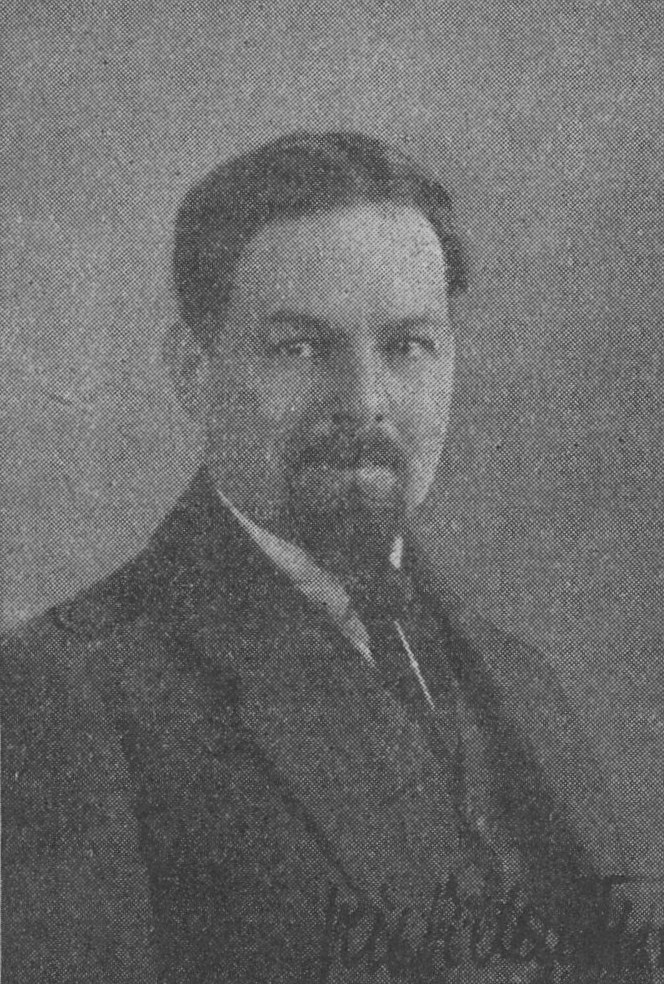
- Born: 20 March 1885; Frankfurt, Germany
- Died: 12 January 1947 (aged 61); Washington D.C. United States
- Parent(s): Caroline Valentin, (mother)

Veit Valentin (25 March 1885, Frankfurt – 12 January 1947, Washington D.C.) was a German historian who was Professor of History at the University of Freiburg.

In comments that caused a storm of controversy in Germany, Valentin attacked Ernst Graf zu Reventlow's Deutschlands Auswärtige Politik in 1916: "It is a classic example of historiographical demagogy and we have no choice but to warn the public against the book and its author". During the First World War, Gustav Stresemann tried to have Valentin sent to court for alleged treasonable utterances.

Valentin was appointed by the German Foreign Office to write a history of German foreign policy, permitting him access to their papers. This was published in 1921 as Deutschlands Aussenpolitik, 1890-1918. In assessing responsibility for causing the World War during the July Crisis, Valentin ranked Russia as the country most to blame, followed by Austria-Hungary, with France, England and Germany joint third. Valentin wrote: "None of the Powers was wholly innocent, none alone guilty. The world spirit was ready for the world war".

In a conversation with Paul Nikolaus Cossmann, the editor of the Süddeutsche Monatshefte, Valentin accused Admiral Alfred von Tirpitz of doctoring statistics related to Germany's performance in the U-boat campaign. Cossmann launched a legal action against Valentin and he resigned his professorship, thus ending his academic career in Germany.
