= Larin Paraske =

Izhorian runic singer (1833–1904)

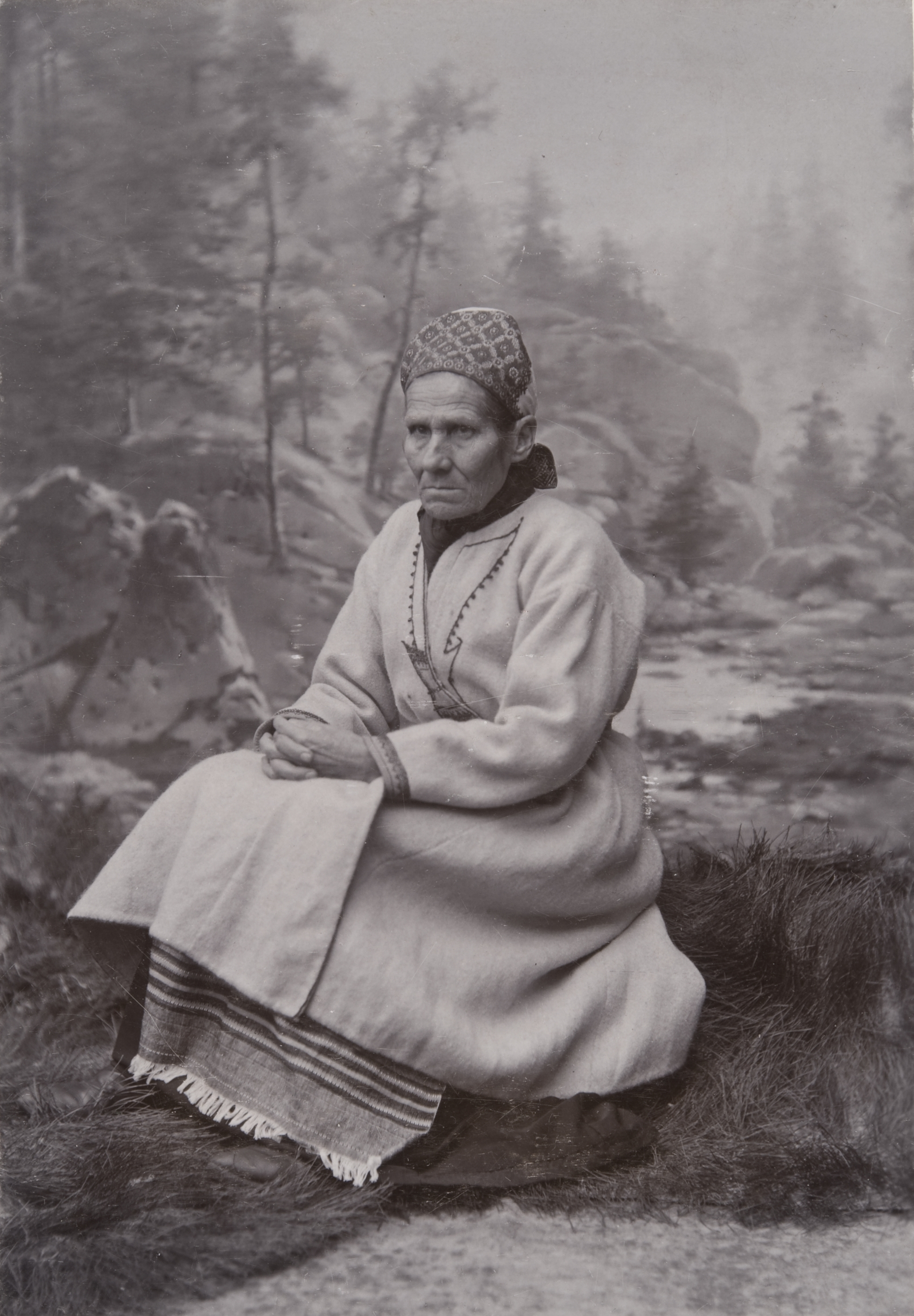
Larin Paraske (c. 1891). Photo by the Helsinki-based photographer Daniel Nyblin.

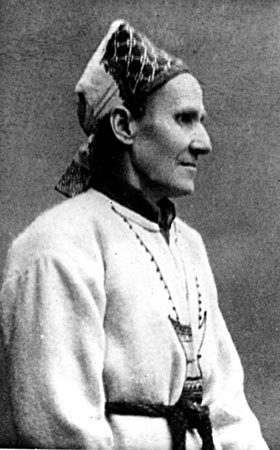
Larin Paraske in 1892

Larin Paraske (December 27, 1833 – January 3, 1904) was an Izhorian runic singer. She is considered a key figure in Finnish folk poetry and has been called the "Finnish Mnemosyne". Her frequent listeners included several romantic nationalist artists, such as Jean Sibelius, seeking inspiration from her interpretations of Kalevala, an epic poem compiled from Finnish folklore by Elias Lönnrot.

Paraske could recite over 32,000 verses of poetry, which made her an important source for Karelian culture. Her poems were written down by Adolf Neovius in the 1880s, and after several years of work, approximately 1200 poems, 1750 proverbs and 336 riddles were documented, along with several Finnic lamentations known as itkuvirsi, performed by crying and sobbing.

== Biography ==
Paraske was born as Paraskeva Nikitina, her official Russian name, in Lempaala, Northern Ingria. Her father Mikitta Mikitanpoika (1802–1851) was a landless peasant, a lampuoti, who rented a farm. Both of her parents were ethnic Izhorians. Paraske took on poetry at early age by memorizing all the poems known in the area, and creating many more herself. Her relatives, Timon Tarja and Kondrolan Maura, were also prolific poets. Paraske's father died in 1851 and her mother, Tatjana Vasilovna, had died three years earlier in 1848.

In 1853, Paraske married a peasant named Kaurila Teppananpoika, or Gavril Stepanov, from Vaskela village in Sakkola (later Metsäpirtti municipality) of Viipuri Province. Her husband was sickly and 20 years older than she was, but the marriage produced nine children during the years from 1855 to 1878; only three of them survived until adulthood. Besides her own children, Paraske cared for 50 orphans from St. Petersburg. Her life was hard as the livelihood of the family depended on her income. Her husband died in 1888.

Paraske's life changed in 1887, when she came to the attention of the clergyman Adolf Neovius, who was documenting national folk poetry. Neovius recognized her talent and paid Paraske a ruble per hour for singing her poetry. With this money, Paraske was able to save her house from seizure. Their collaboration resulted in transcriptions of 1200 poems, 1750 proverbs and 336 riddles. Her poems had earlier been written down by A. Borenius-Lähteenkorva in 1877, but this work consisted of only 26 poems.

In 1891, Neovius moved to Porvoo and Paraske traveled to the city with him to complete their project. During the years from 1891 to 1894, she gave several performances in Porvoo and Helsinki, becoming very popular. Her Kalevala-themed rune singing influenced several prominent artists. Jean Sibelius' Kullervo, Op. 7 has been said to contain elements of Paraske's hypnotic, incantatory singing style. Albert Edelfelt and Eero Järnefelt painted portraits of Paraske in 1893.

Paraske returned to Vaskela, Sakkola in 1894. Despite her success, she remained poor. Her house was sold during the summer of 1899 due to tax arrears, and she had to move into her neighbour's sauna. The Finnish Literature Society granted Paraske an artist's pension in 1901, but she was unable to overcome her financial problems. She died destitute in Sakkola in 1904.

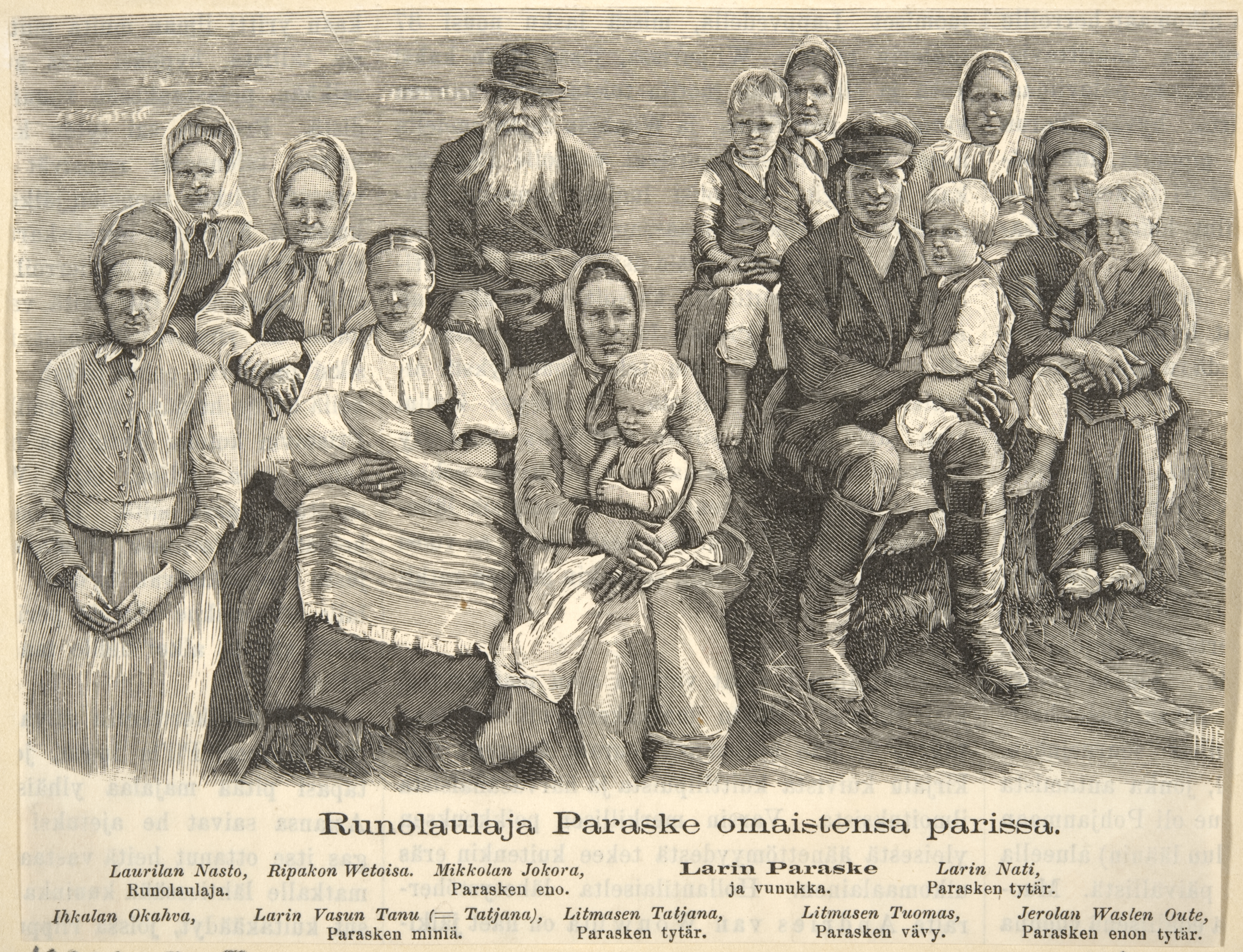
Larin Paraske with a family, c. 1906

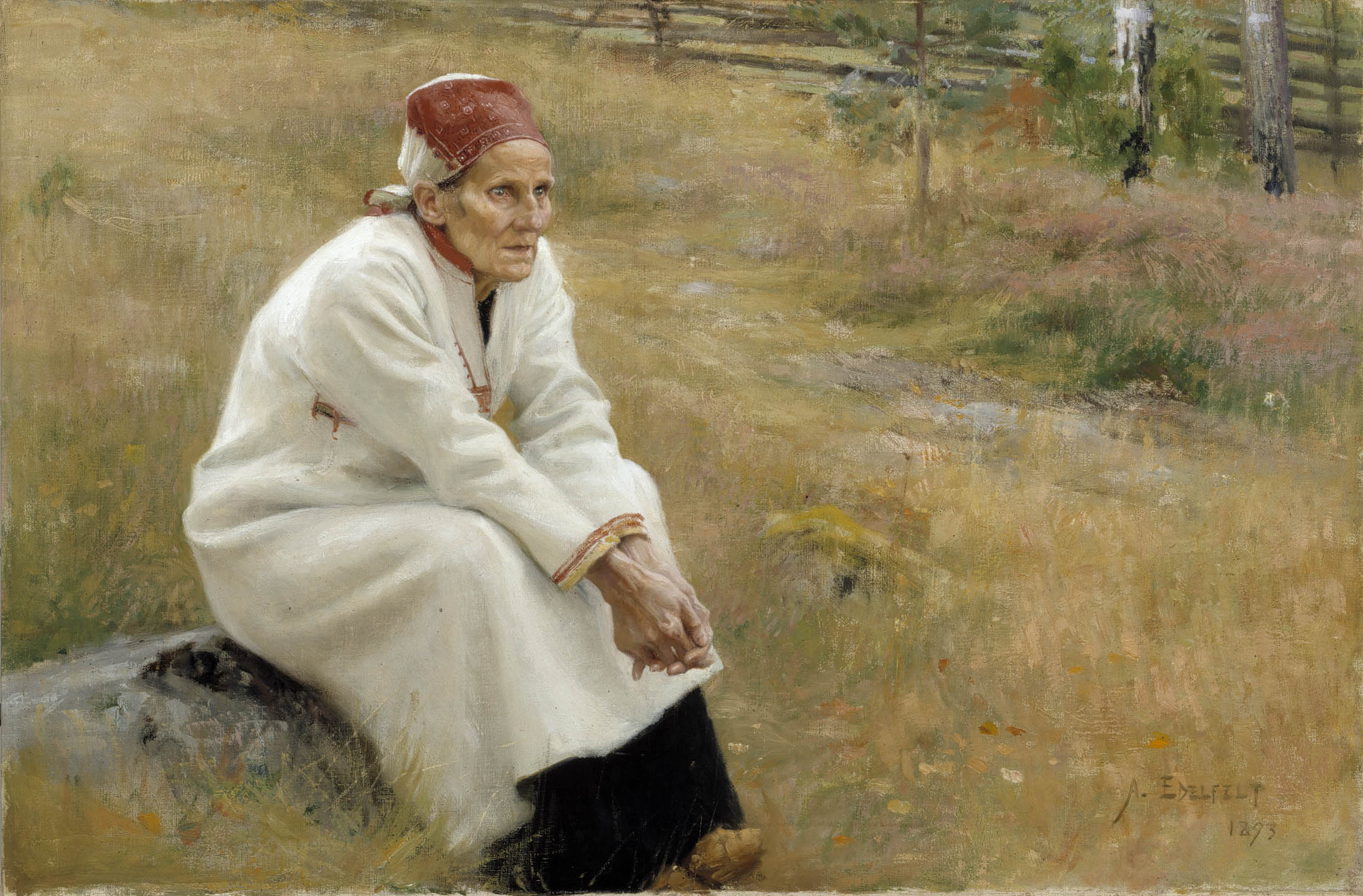
Portrait by Albert Edelfelt in 1893

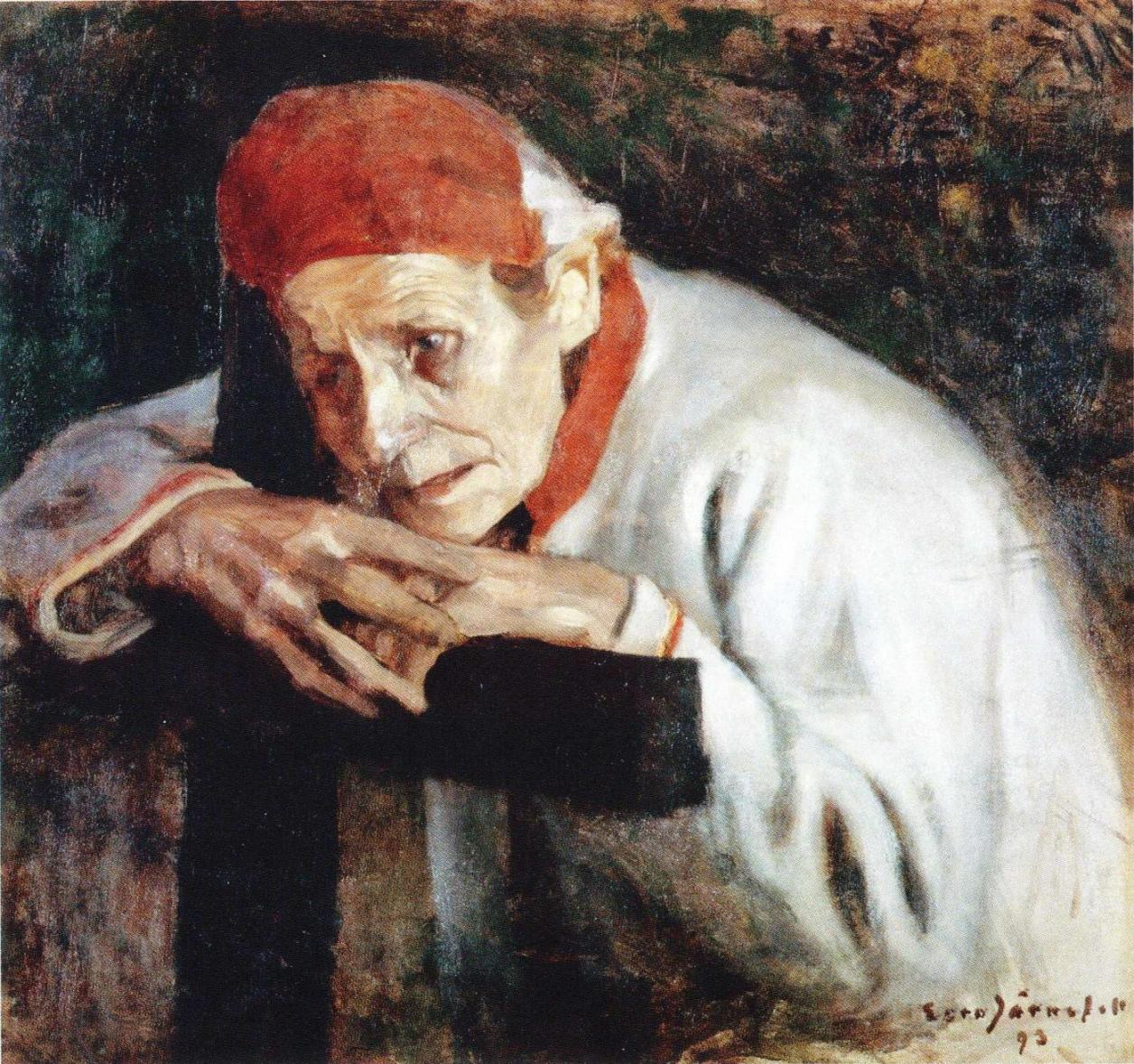
Painted by Eero Järnefelt in 1893

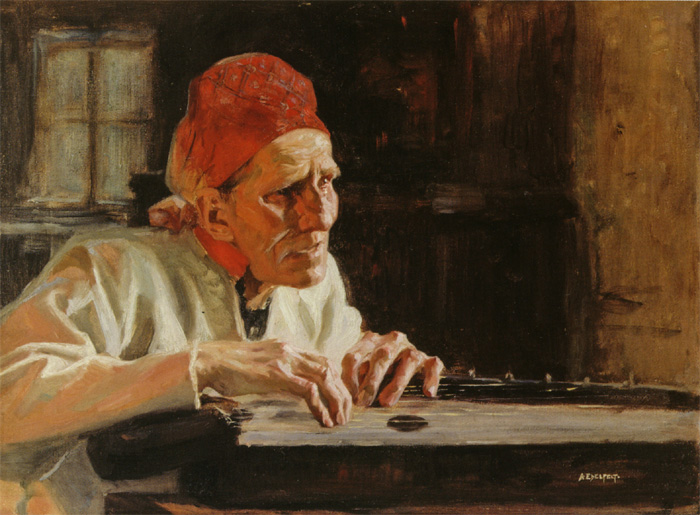
Larin Paraske Sings Requiems, Albert Edelfelt, 1893

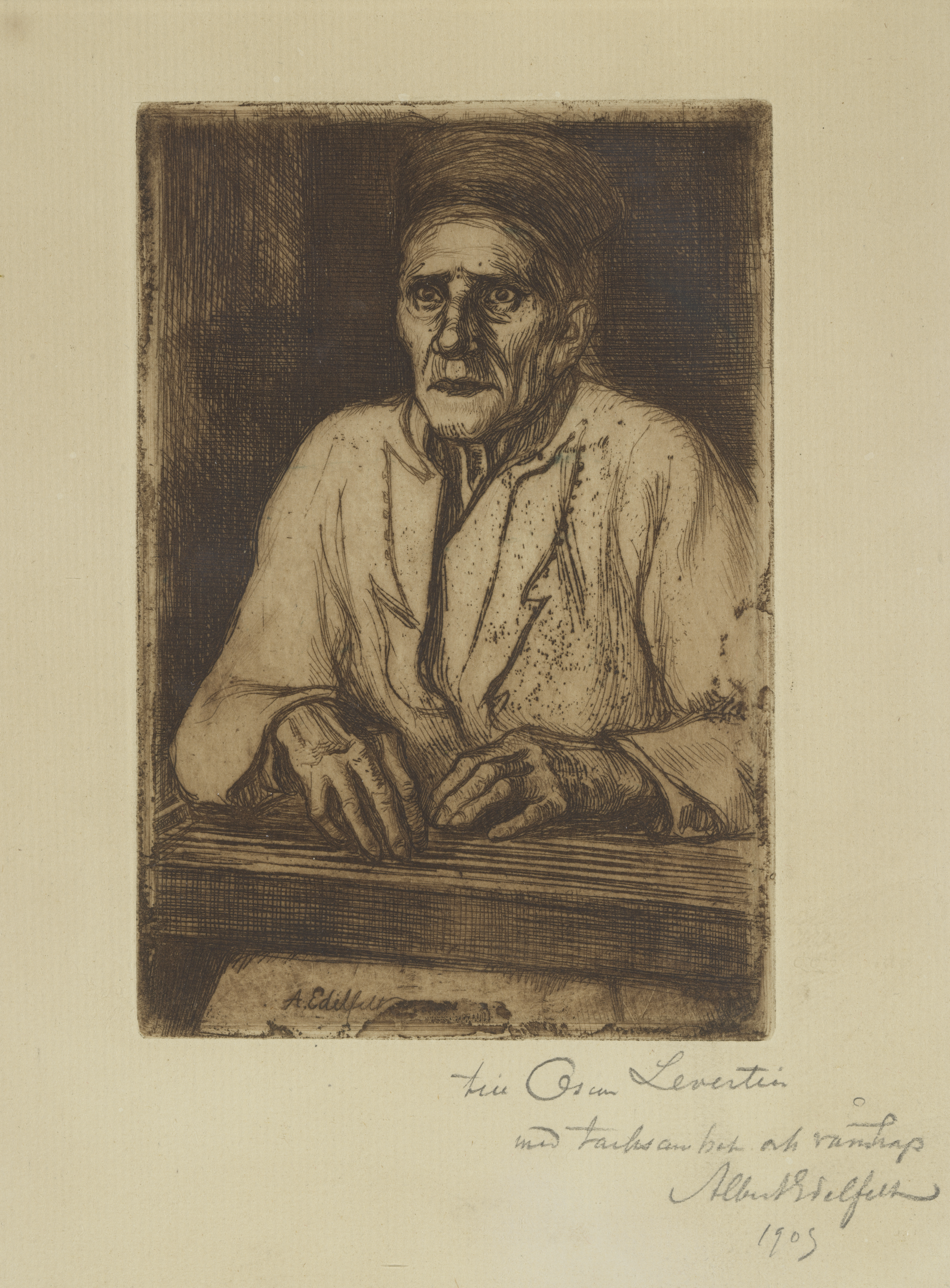
Larin Paraske with Kantele, etching by Albert Edelfelt, c. 1905, Thiel Gallery

== Legacy ==
In 1936, sculptor Alpo Sailo created a statue of Paraske. It was planned for the Kalevala building, which, however, was never realized, so the statue was erected in 1949 in the Hakasalmi park, off of Mannerheimintie, in Helsinki. A street named after Paraske is located in Kaarela, a district of Helsinki. In 2004, Paraske placed 87th on Suuret suomalaiset, a vote arranged by YLE, the Finnish Broadcasting Company, to determine the "100 Greatest Finns". Paraske is also one of the people on the stamps of Finland.

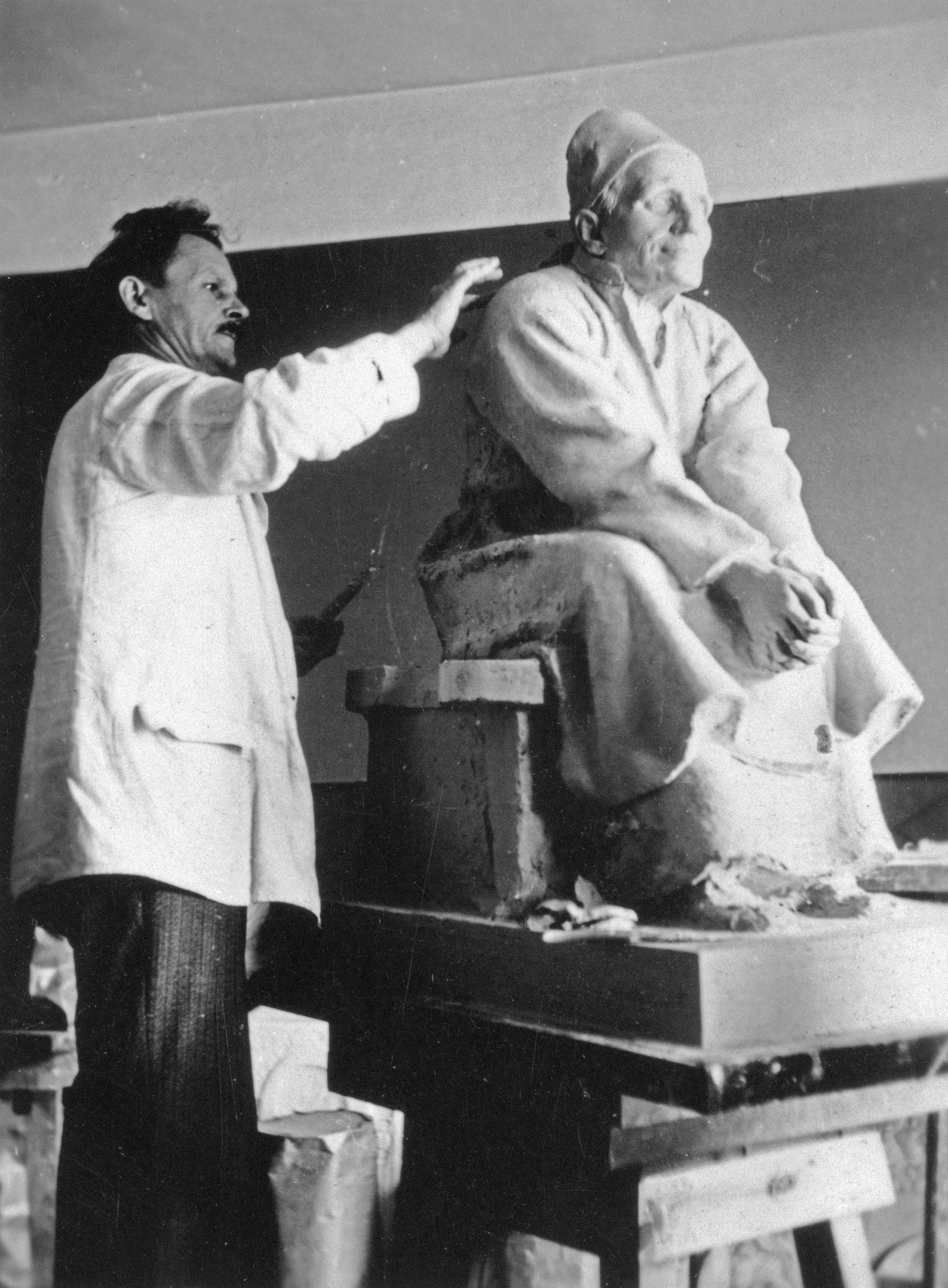
Sculptor Alpo Sailo (1877–1955) working on a statue of Paraske, c. 1935–1936

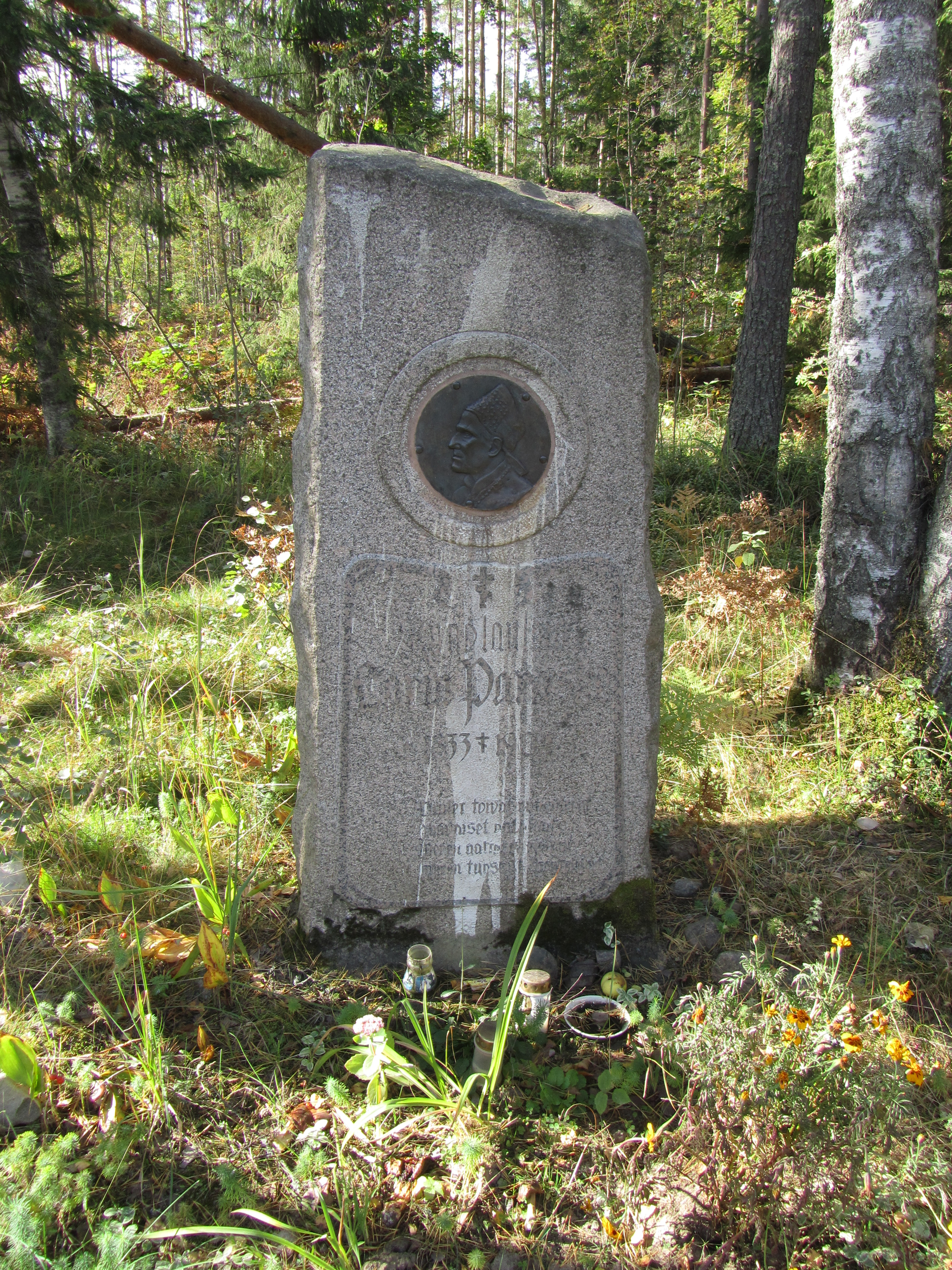
Monument to Paraske at the Orthodox cemetery in Palkeala (now Zamost'ye, Leningrad Oblast)

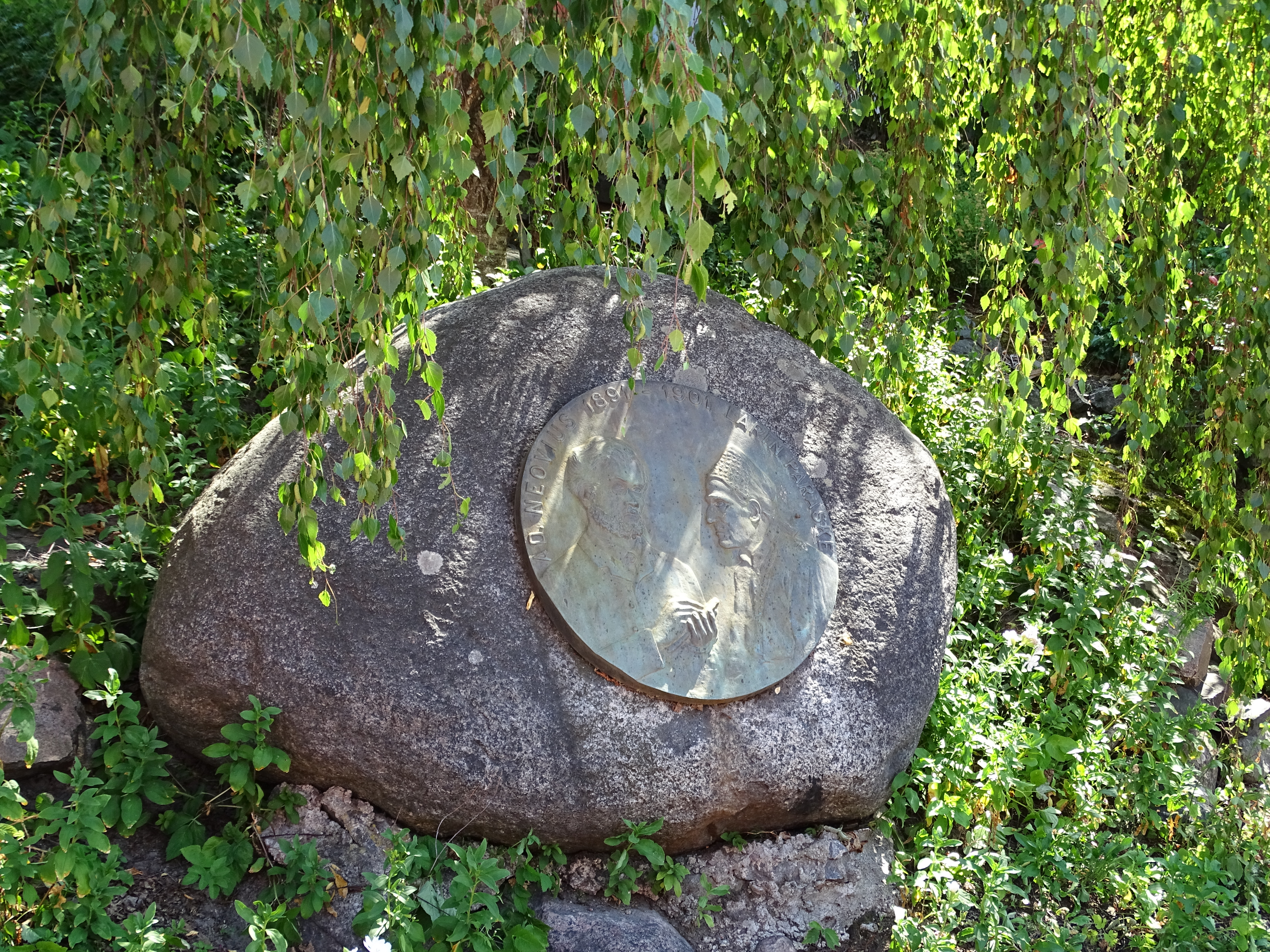
Remembrance relief for Paraske in Porvoo

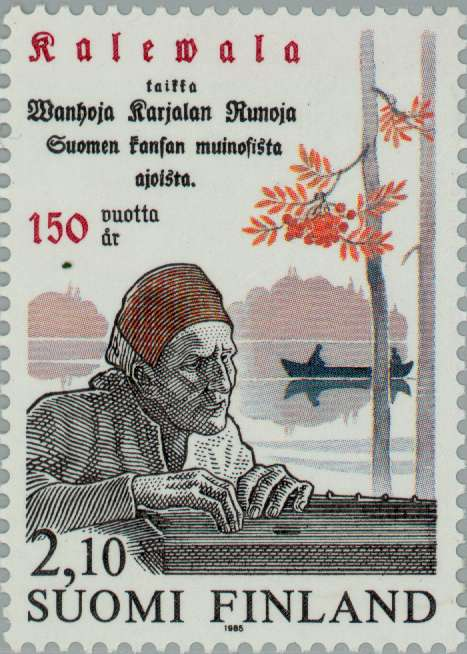
1985 Finnish postage stamp depicting Paraske
