= An African Millionaire =

1904 play

- Written by: Edgar Wallace
- Original language: English
- Genre: Drama

Premiere
- Date premiered: 1904

An African Millionaire is a 1904 play by the British writer Edgar Wallace, then a journalist working for the Daily Mail.

It was his first play, and proved to be a major flop, running for only six performances in a Cape Town theatre, before being withdrawn after a very poor reception from critics. Wallace had previously spent several years in South Africa working as a journalist, and modelled the story on the life of Cecil Rhodes. His expectations that the play would be a hit and then transfer to London and other cities of the Empire provided unfounded.

Wallace's popular thriller novel The Four Just Men was published the following year launching his career as a fiction author.

== Bibliography ==
- Clark, Neil. Stranger than Fiction: The Life of Edgar Wallace, the Man Who Created King Kong. Stroud, UK: The History Press, 2015.
