= William Tell Told Again =

1904 novel by P. G. Wodehouse

First edition cover

William Tell Told Again is a retelling of the William Tell legend in prose and verse with illustrations. The main prose element was written by P. G. Wodehouse, while Philip Dadd supplied the frontispiece and 15 full-page illustrations, all in colour. The 15 illustrations were each accompanied by a verse written by John W. Houghton, who also wrote the prologue and epilogue in verse.

The book was published on 11 November 1904 by Adam & Charles Black, London, and was dedicated "to Biddy O'Sullivan for a Christmas present". Wodehouse dedicated books to 43 different people; "Biddy O'Sullivan" was the last to be traced. Her identity was not known until 2006, when she was identified as the young daughter of Denis O'Sullivan (1869–1908), an actor and singer who was a friend of Wodehouse in the early 1900s.

== Plot ==
The title of the book comes from its prologue, which is told in verse (by John W. Houghton):

THE Swiss, against their Austrian foes,
Had ne'er a soul to lead 'em,
Till Tell, as you've heard tell, arose
And guided them to freedom.
Tell's tale we tell again—an act
For which pray no one scold us—
This tale of Tell we tell, in fact,
As this Tell tale was told us.

The story is said to take place many years ago. Switzerland is under the control of the Emperor of Austria, who has his friend Hermann Gessler govern the country. Gessler is a tyrannical Governor and imposes excessive taxes on the Swiss people. The people of Switzerland send three representatives – Walter Fürst, Werner Staufacher, and Arnold of Melchthal – to Gessler's Hall of Audience to complain about the taxes. Gessler refuses to change the taxes and uses the threat of boiling oil (demonstrated on the tip of Arnold of Melchtha's finger, for which he is charged a fee) to make the three men leave the Hall. The townspeople decide to rebel, and to ask William Tell to be their leader. Tell is brave, patriotic, and skilled with the crossbow. The three representatives go to Tell's house. Tell lives with his wife Hedwig, who is the daughter of Walter Fürst, and their sons Walter and William. Tell is not much of an orator and is reluctant to be a leader, but he agrees to help if they need anything done.

Gessler enjoys annoying the Swiss by forbidding things, but having banned games, dancing, and singing, he has run out of things to forbid. He comes up with an idea and has a pole set up in the middle of the meadow just outside the town. He also has an old hat of his placed on top of it. Everyone must show their reverence to him by bowing to the hat when they pass by. Anybody who crosses the meadow without bowing will be arrested. Two armoured soldiers, Friesshardt and Leuthold, keep watch by the pole all day. A crowd gathers to throw eggs and other things at the guards from afar, without crossing the meadow. Tell and his son Walter, who have not heard about the hat on the pole, start to cross the meadow without bowing. The soldiers command Tell to bow but he keeps walking, and Friesshardt hits him on the head with a pike. Tell fights back, and is joined by the rest of the crowd. Tell, however, does not think a crowd should fight two men. He shoots the hat on the pole, which puts an end to the fighting as the people rejoice.

Gessler enters the meadow with a bodyguard of armed men, and the townspeople scatter. The two soldiers tell Gessler what happened. Gessler already dislikes Tell because Tell once insulted him, and is displeased that he shot the hat. Walter claims that his father can hit an apple on a tree a hundred yards away. Gessler says that Tell must shoot an apple off of his son's head from a hundred yards away, or else his own life will be forfeit. Tell responds that he would rather die than shoot at an apple on his son's head, but Gessler insists that Tell will die with his son if he refuses. The crowd returns and observes. Walter is confident his father will make the shot. Tell draws two arrows and places one in his belt. He fires the first arrow, piercing the apple, and the crowd cheers. Gessler asks Tell why he had placed a second arrow in his belt, and assures him that his life is safe whatever the reason. Tell explains that if the first arrow had hit his son, he would have shot Gessler with the second arrow. Enraged, Gessler has him arrested, claiming that he had promised Tell his life but not his freedom. Tell is to be imprisoned in Gessler's castle across the lake. He is bound and brought to Gessler's ship.

On the lake, the ship is caught in a storm. The helmsman is not skilled or strong enough to steer the ship in the storm, so Gessler orders Tell to steer. Tell steers the ship through a rocky area and saves them. When Gessler commands the guards to bind him again, Tell grabs the bow and quiver lying on the deck and jumps off the ship onto the rocks. Gessler orders his bowmen to shoot Tell, but Tell is faster, and Gessler is killed by Tell's second arrow. With the death of the Governor, the Swiss people are no longer afraid and successfully revolt against Austrian rule. A group of people bring Tell Gessler's pole, with his hat still nailed to it by Tell's arrow. Some of them want to burn the pole, but Tell decides to have it preserved as a memorial to their newly gained liberty. Tell retires to his home and lives there happily ever afterwards with his family.

== Style ==
The prose by Wodehouse is a parody of retellings of famous stories. It maintains the basic outline of the traditional legend, but distorts single elements in many parts of the story for their comic value. The language used in the book imitates the slightly artificial, pompous prose used in stories retold for children, with occasional archaic expressions such as "I' faith!". There are some examples in the book of the stylistic devices that Wodehouse would frequently use in his later comic novels. For example, Tell uses a mixed metaphor in the story: "'Gentlemen,' continued Tell, 'the flood-gates of revolution have been opened. From this day they will stalk through the land burning to ashes the slough of oppression which our tyrant Governor has erected in our midst."

Wodehouse would later use incongruous enumerations or lists to create humour. An example of this occurs in the story, in a description of Tell: "He had the courage of a lion, the sure-footedness of a wild goat, the agility of a squirrel, and a beautiful beard."

== Publication history ==
The pictures, and possibly the verse, were done more than a year before Wodehouse was asked to supply the narrative.

The American edition was issued by Macmillan, New York, from imported sheets, in December 1904.

The Wodehouse text of William Tell Told Again was reprinted without the verse captions and with different illustrations by "Bowyer", including 13 black and white illustrations and one coloured plate, in the anthology The Favourite Wonder Book, published by Odhams, London, in 1938.

William Tell Told Again was collected in the Wodehouse collection The Eighteen-Carat Kid and Other Stories, which was published in the US in 1980.

Regarding the book in the context of Wodehouse's works, Evelyn Waugh wrote in 1961, "Collectors prize as bibliographical rarities such early works as William Tell Told Again and Swoop, but it is impossible to discern in them any promise of what was to come." However, Barry Phelps, in his book P. G. Wodehouse: Man and Myth (1992), held a different view of both William Tell Told Again and The Swoop!: "Both books are early Wodehouse, writing rapidly for cash rather than art, giving them an exuberant, uninhibited freshness. He clearly enjoyed writing them and they are a marker for what is to come." In his 2003 book Plum Sauce: A P. G. Wodehouse Companion, Richard Usborne described William Tell Told Again: "A short, cheerful narrative by Wodehouse, excellent colour pictures by Philip Dadd and excellent verse captions to the pictures, by John W. Houghton – very much the sort of expert verse Wodehouse himself was already writing, in Punch and elsewhere."
