= Oscar A. H. Schmitz =

German writer (1873–1931)

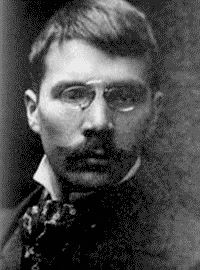
Oscar A. H. Schmitz

Oscar Adolf Hermann Schmitz (16 April 1873 – 17 December 1931) was a German writer.

== Biography ==
Schmitz was born in Bad Homburg, Hesse-Nassau. His father was a railroad director and his mother was a daughter of a Jewish banker. He completed his high school education from Wöhler School in Frankfurt and later in Weilburg. In 1892, he began studying law, economics, and the humanities at the University of Heidelberg and the University of Leipzig. That same year, he traveled to Tuscany, where he met Karl Wolfskehl, who introduced him to the George Circle and facilitated the publication of his poems in Blätter für die Kunst starting in 1896.

From 1894 onward, Schmitz traveled extensively throughout Europe, including Italy, Budapest, Vienna, Prague, Holland, Belgium, England, Ireland, and Scandinavia. In 1895, he moved to Munich to complete his studies but discontinued his doctoral efforts after two unsuccessful attempts. Supported by his father's fortune, Schmitz became involved in bohemian and bourgeois cultural circles, sharing a residence with Franz Hessel and Franziska zu Reventlow.

Schmitz authored the roman à clef When We Women Awake (1913), which paralleled Reventlow's Mr. Dame's Notes by depicting the activities of the "cosmicists" around Stefan George.

After leaving the George Circle in 1904, Schmitz lived primarily in Berlin from 1907 and moved to Salzburg in 1915, where he resided until his death in 1931. In Salzburg, he worked as a psychoanalyst and engaged with Carl Gustav Jung's depth psychology, publishing works such as Psychoanalysis and Yoga(1923) and Psychology of Gender Characters (1929). He returned to Frankfurt am Main in 1931.

Schmitz was also active as a journalist, writing essays on political and social issues. He advocated for radical individualism and explored topics in astrology and the teachings of Hermann Gf. Keyserling. Politically, he was associated with Karl Anton Prinz Rohan's Pan-European movement.

== Work ==
- Französische Gesellschaftsprobleme (1907)
- Was uns Frankreich war; Brevier für Weltleute (1911)
- Kunst der Politik (1911)
