= Paul Wentzcke =

German academic, archivist, and historian

- Born: Friedrich Wilhelm Heinrich Paul Wentzcke; September 4, 1879; Koblenz, Germany
- Died: November 25, 1960 (aged 81); Frankfurt, West Germany
- Occupation(s): Academic, historian, archivist

Friedrich Wilhelm Heinrich Paul Wentzcke (September 4, 1879 – November 25, 1960) was a German academic, archivist, and historian.

He proposed a national flag for West Germany in 1948.

_{The flag that Paul Wentzcke proposed for West Germany, called the "Republican Tricolour"}
