= Euphemia Vale Blake =

American author and critic (1817–1904)

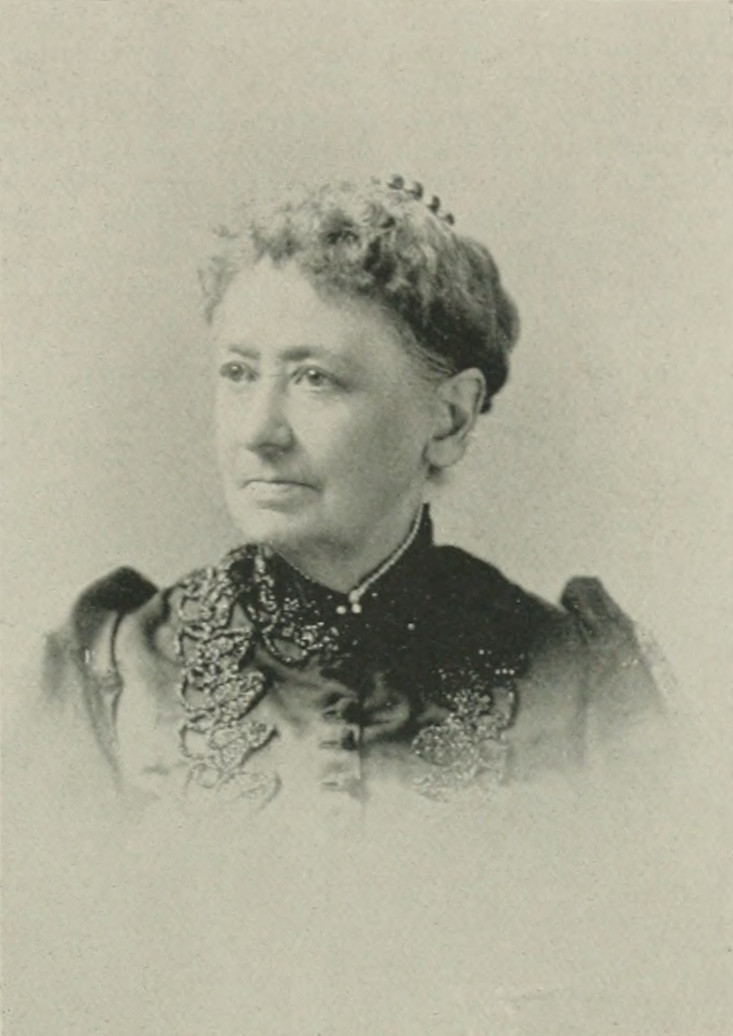
- Photo in A Woman of the Century
- Born: Euphemia Vale; 7 May 1817; Hastings, England
- Died: 28 October 1904 (aged 87); Brooklyn, New York, U.S.
- Resting place: Green-Wood Cemetery
- Occupations: author, critic
- Spouses: Mayo Gerrish Smith (m. 1842; div. 1857) ; Daniel S. Blake (m. 1863)
- Writing career
- Pen name: E. Vale Smith, E. Vale Blake
- Language: English

Euphemia Vale Blake (née, Vale; pen names, E. Vale Smith and E. Vale Blake; 7 May 1817 – 21 October 1904) was a British-born American author and critic. She wrote extensively for the North American Review, the Christian Examiner, the Boston Evening Transcript, and other well-known publications. From 1857, she lived in Brooklyn, engaged in journalism. She was the author of Arctic Experiences; Teeth, Ether and Chloroform; History of Newburyport; A History of Tammany Hall, and Ocean Wonders (on sea life).

== Early life ==
Euphemia Vale was born in Hastings, England, 1817. (Note: Harper's Encyclopedia of United States History records that Euphemia was born in Rye, Sussex, England, May 7, 1824. Brooklyn Historical Society also records 1824. Willard & Livermore record 1825, as does Herringshaw. VIAF records two birth years, 1817 and 1824.) Her parents were Prof. Gilbert Vale and Hepsibah (Johnstone) Vale. She came with her father, mother and other members of the family to New York City in 1823. Her father was well-known as an author, publisher, inventor, public lecturer and a professor of astronomy and other branches of mathematics, making a specialty of navigation; he died in Brooklyn in 1866.

== Career ==
In New York City, in 1842, she married Dr. Mayo Gerrish Smith, son of Foster Smith. Soon after her marriage, she came with her husband to Newburyport, Massachusetts, and lived for some months in the family of her father-in-law, on Smith's court, removing later to a dwelling house on Essex street, where her husband had an office fitted up for his use as a dental surgeon. After the discovery of gold in California, in 1849, Dr. Smith went to the Pacific coast, and remained there seven years.

During his absence, Blake was engaged in literary work. She was a frequent contributor to the Newburyport Herald, taking the editorial duties whenever the chief was absent. She also edited a weekly literary paper the Saturday Evening Union, and supplied leading articles for the Watch Tower. At that time, she was also writing for the North American Review and Christian Examiner, all the editorials for the Bay State, a weekly published in Lynn, with occasional articles in the Boston daily journals, the Transcript, Traveller, Atlas, and others. It was in the Atlas that one of her articles, in 1853, started the movement for revising the laws of Massachusetts and causing the adoption of that law limiting the franchise to those capable of reading the Constitution of the United States.

She furnished a series of "Letters from New York" to the Boston Traveller and wrote essays for the Religious Magazine. Then, for the New York Quarterly, she did much book reviewing. She also wrote for the Constellation, edited by Park Benjamin Sr. In 1854, she wrote and published the history of the town of Newburyport, and a scientific work on the use of ether and chloroform applied to practical dentistry. She wrote the first considerable criticisms of Dickens' early novels as they appeared, and also the early works of George William Curtis.

In 1857, she removed to New York, and was there granted a decree of divorce from her husband. In 1859 to 1861, she regularly supplied the Crayon, an art magazine published in New York, with elaborate articles on literature and art. To settle a wager between two friends, one of whom bet that no one "could impose on the New York Herald," and the other thinking it might be possible, Blake wrote a "Great Manifesto! Declaration of Independence by the States of South Carolina, Georgia, Alabama, Florida, and Mississippi. Copy of the Instructions sent to France! etc." Frederic Hudson, the editor-in-chief accepted the manifesto as genuine. It was printed 14 November 1860, and paid for, and it was a nine-day wonder why the other papers never had it. In 1863, she married, in New York, Dr. Daniel S. Blake, who had been for ten or fifteen years a surgeon dentist in Newburyport. After her second marriage, she resided in Brooklyn.

In 1871, Blake furnished historical articles to the Catholic World on Milesians. Next followed articles for the Christian Union, and, at the request of Henry Ward Beecher, a few short stories. A little later, she contributed essays to Popular Science Monthly. One of her productions was printed in the Brooklyn Eagle of 23 November 1871, discussing the riparian rights of Brooklyn to her own shoreline. It was a historical piece of all the legislation on the subject, from colonial times to the date of publication. The late Chief Justice Joseph Nielson, of the city court, remarked that "the argument was unanswerable." In 1874, she published Arctic Experiences (New York), to give a correct history of the Polaris expedition and Captain George Tyson's ice drift, and containing also a sketch of all the preceding expeditions, both American and foreign. In 1879, and subsequently, Blake wrote regularly for the Oriental Church Magazine. She wrote several lectures on historical and social topics for a literary bureau in New York, which were repeatedly delivered by a man who claimed them as his own. She also wrote a book on marine zoology and a series of articles on "The Marys of History, Art and Song." She occasionally wrote in verse.

== Personal life ==
She had two children with Smith, Mayo Vale Smith, born June 25, 1844, and Euphemia Smith, born September 20, 1848.

Euphemia Vale Blake died 21 October 1904 at her home in Brooklyn, and is buried in that city's Green-Wood Cemetery. The E. Vale Blake papers are held by the Brooklyn Historical Society.

== Selected works ==
- History of Newburyport (1854)
- Arctic Experiences (1874)
- The Universal Name (1894)
- History of the Tammany Society, or Columbian Order, from its organization to the present time (1901)
