= Philip Dadd =

British illustrator

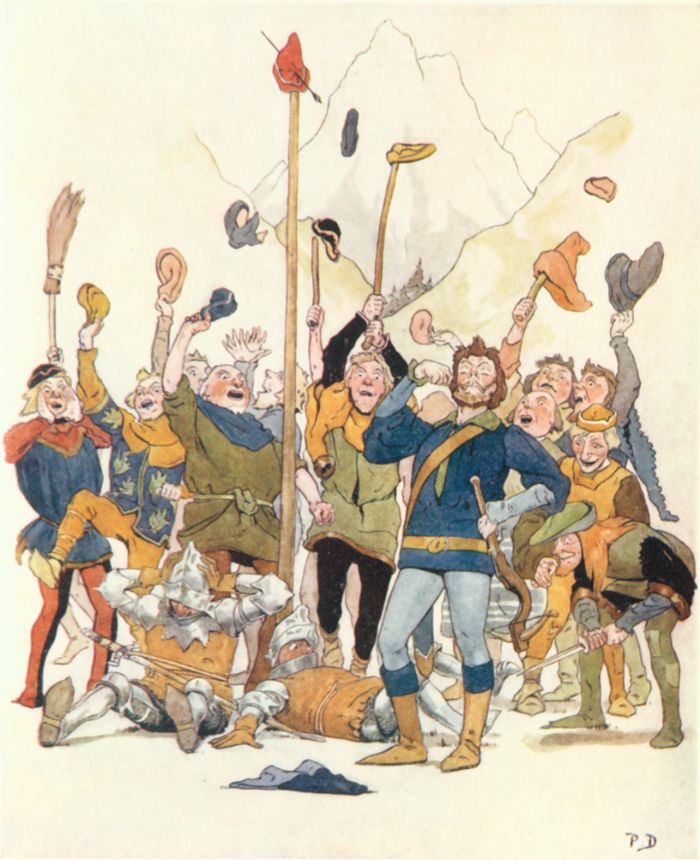
One of Dadd's illustrations for the 1904 book William Tell Told Again.

Philip John Stephen Dadd (1880 – 2 August 1916) was a British illustrator.

Dadd was born in Poplar. He was born into an artistic family: on his father's side, his uncle was the artist Richard Dadd; on his mother's side, his maternal grandfather was the engraver John Greenaway, and his aunt was the illustrator Kate Greenaway.

Dadd studied at the Slade School of Fine Art from 1900 to 1903, and he became a staff artist at The Sphere magazine. He illustrated the 1904 book William Tell Told Again by P. G. Wodehouse, accompanied by verses written by John W. Houghton.

His work was included in several public exhibitions before 1914, at the Royal Academy, Brook Street Art Gallery, the Royal Society of Painters in Water Colours, the Royal Institute of Oil Painters, and the Walker Art Gallery in Liverpool.

After the outbreak of the First World War, he enlisted in December 1915 as a private in the 16th (County of London) Battalion, the London Regiment. He served on the Western Front in France. On 12 August 1916, Dadd's illustration of a British gas sentry ringing a medieval church bell to alert troops of a German gas attack appeared on the cover of The Sphere.

The illustration had been published posthumously: Dadd was killed in France on 2 August 1916. He is buried in the Maroeuil British Cemetery near Arras.
