= Paul Nikolaus Cossmann =

German writer and journalist (1869–1942)

Paul Nikolaus Cossmann (6 April 1869 – 19 October 1942) was a German journalist.

== Biography ==
Born in Baden-Baden into a Jewish family, his parents were cellist Bernhard Cossmann and his wife Mathilde Hilb, the daughter of a Karlsruhe merchant. He never married. He converted to Roman Catholicism in 1905 and subsequently was a devout practitioner of the faith.

The elder Cossmann had been working in Moscow, but returned to his native country so that his son could be educated "as a German in Germany". While a gymnasium student in Frankfurt, he became a friend and devoted admirer of Hans Pfitzner; the two were the same age. He studied the natural sciences and philosophy, with a focus on Arthur Schopenhauer and settled on a career in journalism. He launched Süddeutsche Monatshefte in Munich in 1903, leading it for the next three decades and soon establishing the review as one of the leading German cultural magazines of its day. During World War I, he intransigently promoted victory for Germany, while the magazine's special editions propelled its circulation upward, both on the front and among civilians. He retained a nationalist outlook in the wake of the German defeat, joining Münchener Neuesten Nachrichten as a political adviser in 1921.

Cossmann's tireless struggle against the Treaty of Versailles and campaigns about the related topics of war debt (1922) and the stab-in-the-back myth (1925) earned him the reputation of a ruthless nationalist. He was falsely accused of pursuing causes on behalf of a political party or wealthy backers, but in fact Cossmann acted from conviction. While the stab-in-the-back furore served to poison the political atmosphere, he had actually sought to integrate German workers into the societal mainstream. While a fanatic when it came to his version of the truth, he was reportedly an unusually kind man possessed of warm social feeling, as well as a tireless promoter of charitable initiatives. He was imprisoned in March 1933 for more than a year as an unconditional opponent of Adolf Hitler. From 1934 to 1938, he lived in seclusion in Isartal, studying the Church Fathers. In 1938, he was sent to a Munich-area concentration camp for Jews. In the summer of 1942, already seriously ill, he was deported to Theresienstadt concentration camp, where he soon died in the hospital. During his stay there, he consoled and spiritually strengthened his fellow inmates, some of whom revered him as a saintly figure.
